= List of Palaemonidae genera =

These 163 genera belong to the family Palaemonidae, palaemonid shrimps. At least 1,200 described species are placed in the Palaemonidae.

== Palaemonidae genera ==
- Actinimenes Duriš & Horká, 2017
- Allopontonia Bruce, 1972
- Altopontonia Bruce, 1990
- Amphipontonia Bruce, 1991
- Anapontonia Bruce, 1966
- Anchiopontonia Bruce, 1992
- Anchistus Borradaile, 1898
- Ancylocaris Schenkel, 1902
- Ancylomenes Okuno & Bruce, 2010
- Anisomenaeus Bruce, 2010
- Apopontonia Bruce, 1976
- Arachnochium N.g.Wowor, 2010
- Araiopontonia Fujino & Miyake, 1970
- Ascidonia Fransen, 2002
- Balssia Kemp, 1922
- Bathymenes Kou, Li & Bruce, 2016
- Blepharocaris Mitsuhashi & Chan, 2007
- Brachycarpus Bate, 1888
- Brucecaris Marin & Chan, 2006
- Bruceonia Fransen, 2002
- Cainonia Bruce, 2005
- Calathaemon Bruce & Short, 1993
- Carinopontonia Bruce, 1988
- Chacella Bruce, 1986
- Climeniperaeus Bruce, 1995
- Colemonia Bruce, 2005
- Conchodytes Peters, 1852
- Coralliocaris Stimpson, 1860
- Coutierea Nobili, 1901
- Creaseria Holthuis, 1950
- Crinotonia Marin, 2006
- Cristimenes Duriš & Horká, 2017
- Cryphiops Dana, 1852
- Ctenopontonia Bruce, 1979
- Cuapetes Clarke, 1919
- Dactylonia Fransen, 2002
- Dasella Lebour, 1945
- Dasycaris Kemp, 1922
- Diapontonia Bruce, 1986
- Echinopericlimenes Marin & Chan, 2014
- Epipontonia Bruce, 1977
- Eupontonia Bruce, 1971
- Exoclimenella Bruce, 1995
- Exopontonia Bruce, 1988
- Fennera Holthuis, 1951
- Gnathophylleptum d’Udekem d’Acoz, 2001
- Gnathophylloides Schmitt, 1933
- Gnathophyllum Latreille, 1819
- Hamiger Borradaile, 1916
- Hamodactyloides Fujino, 1973
- Hamodactylus Holthuis, 1952
- Hamopontonia Bruce, 1970
- Harpiliopsis Borradaile, 1917
- Harpilius Dana, 1852
- Holthuisaeus Anker & De Grave, 2010
- Hymenocera Latreille, 1819
- Ischnopontonia Bruce, 1966
- Isopontonia Bruce, 1982
- Izucaris Okuno, 1999
- Jocaste Holthuis, 1952
- Kaviengella Šobánová & Duriš, 2018
- Laomenes Clarke, 1919
- Leander Desmarest, 1849
- Leandrites Holthuis, 1950
- Leptocarpus Holthuis, 1950
- Leptomenaeus Bruce, 2007
- Leptopalaemon Bruce & Short, 1993
- Levicaris Bruce, 1973
- Lipkebe Chace, 1969
- Lipkemenes Bruce & Okuno, 2010
- Macrobrachium Bate, 1868
- Madangella Frolova & Duris, 2018
- Manipontonia Bruce, Okuno & Li, 2005
- Margitonia Bruce, 2007
- Mesopontonia Bruce, 1967
- Metapontonia Bruce, 1967
- Michaelimenes Okuno, 2017
- Miopontonia Bruce, 1985
- Nematopalaemon Holthuis, 1950
- Neoanchistus Bruce, 1975
- Neoclimenes L.i.Mitsuhashi & Chan, 2010
- Neopalaemon H.H.Jr.Hobbs, 1973
- Neopericlimenes Heard, Spotte & Bubucis, 1993
- Neopontonides Holthuis, 1951
- Nippontonia Bruce & Bauer, 1997
- Notopontonia Bruce, 1991
- Odontonia Fransen, 2002
- Onycocaridella Bruce, 1981
- Onycocaridites Bruce, 1987
- Onycocaris Nobili, 1904
- Onycomenes Bruce, 2009
- Opaepupu Anker & DeGrave, 2021
- Orthopontonia Bruce, 1982
- Palaemon Weber, 1795
- Palaemonella Dana, 1852
- Palaemonetes Heller, 1869
- Paraclimenaeus Bruce, 1988
- Paraclimenes Bruce, 1995
- Paranchistus Holthuis, 1952
- Paratypton Balss, 1914
- Patonia Mitsuhashi & Chan, 2006
- Periclimenaeus Borradaile, 1915
- Periclimenella Bruce, 1995
- Periclimenes Costa, 1844
- Periclimenoides Bruce, 1990
- Philarius Holthuis, 1952
- Phycomenes Bruce, 2008
- Phyllognathia Borradaile, 1915
- Pinnotherotonia Marin & Paulay, 2010
- Platycaris Holthuis, 1952
- Platypontonia Bruce, 1968
- Plesiomenaeus Bruce, 2009
- Plesiopontonia Bruce, 1985
- Pliopontonia Bruce, 1973
- Pontonia Latreille, 1829
- Pontonides Borradaile, 1917
- Pontoniopsides Bruce, 2005
- Pontoniopsis Borradaile, 1915
- Poripontonia Fransen, 2003
- Propontonia Bruce, 1969
- Pseudoclimenes Bruce, 2008
- Pseudocoutierea Holthuis, 1951
- Pseudopalaemon Sollaud, 1911
- Pseudopontonia Bruce, 1992
- Pseudopontonides Heard, 1986
- Pseudoveleronia Marin, 2008
- Pycnocaris Bruce, 1972
- Rapimenes Duriš & Horká, 2017
- Rapipontonia Marin, 2007
- Rhopalaemon Ashelby & De Grave, 2010
- Rostronia Fransen, 2002
- Sandimenes Li, 2009
- Sandyella Marin, 2009
- Stegopontonia Nobili, 1906
- Tectopontonia Bruce, 1973
- Tenuipedium N.g.Wowor, 2010
- Thaumastocaris Kemp, 1922
- Troglindicus Sankolli & Shenoy, 1979
- Troglocubanus Holthuis, 1949
- Troglomexicanus Villalobos, Alvarez & Iliffe, 1999
- Tuleariocaris Hipeau-Jacquotte, 1965
- Typton Costa, 1844
- Typtonoides Bruce, 2010
- Typtonomenaeus Marin & Chan, 2013
- Typtonychus Bruce, 1996
- Unguicaris Marin & Chan, 2006
- Urocaridella Borradaile, 1915
- Urocaris Stimpson, 1860
- Veleronia Holthuis, 1951
- Veleroniopsis Gore, 1981
- Vir Holthuis, 1952
- Waldola Holthuis, 1951
- Yemenicaris Bruce, 1997
- Zenopontonia Bruce, 1975
- † Alburnia Bravi & Garassino, 1998
- † Bechleja Houša, 1957
- † Beurlenia Martins-Neto & Mezzalira, 1991
- † Kellnerius Santana, Pinheiro, Da Silva & Saraiva, 2013
- † Micropsalis von Meyer, 1859
- † Propalaemon Woodward, 1903
- † Pseudocaridinella Martins-Neto & Mezzalira, 1991
- † Schmelingia Schweigert, 2002
- † Yongjiacaris Garassino, Shen, Schram & Taylor, 2002
