= Leptocarpus =

Leptocarpus may refer to:

- Leptocarpus (crustacean), a genus of shrimps in the family Palaemonidae
- Leptocarpus (plant), a genus of flowering plants in the family Restionaceae
