= Neopontonides beaufortensis =

Scientific classification
- Domain: Eukaryota
- Kingdom: Animalia
- Phylum: Arthropoda
- Class: Malacostraca
- Order: Decapoda
- Suborder: Pleocyemata
- Infraorder: Caridea
- Family: Palaemonidae
- Genus: Neopontonides
- Species: N. beaufortensis

Binomial name
- Neopontonides beaufortensis (Borrad., 1920)

Species of crustacean

Neopontonides beaufortensis is a crustacean species in the family Palaemonidae first described by Lancelot Alexander Borradaile in 1920.
