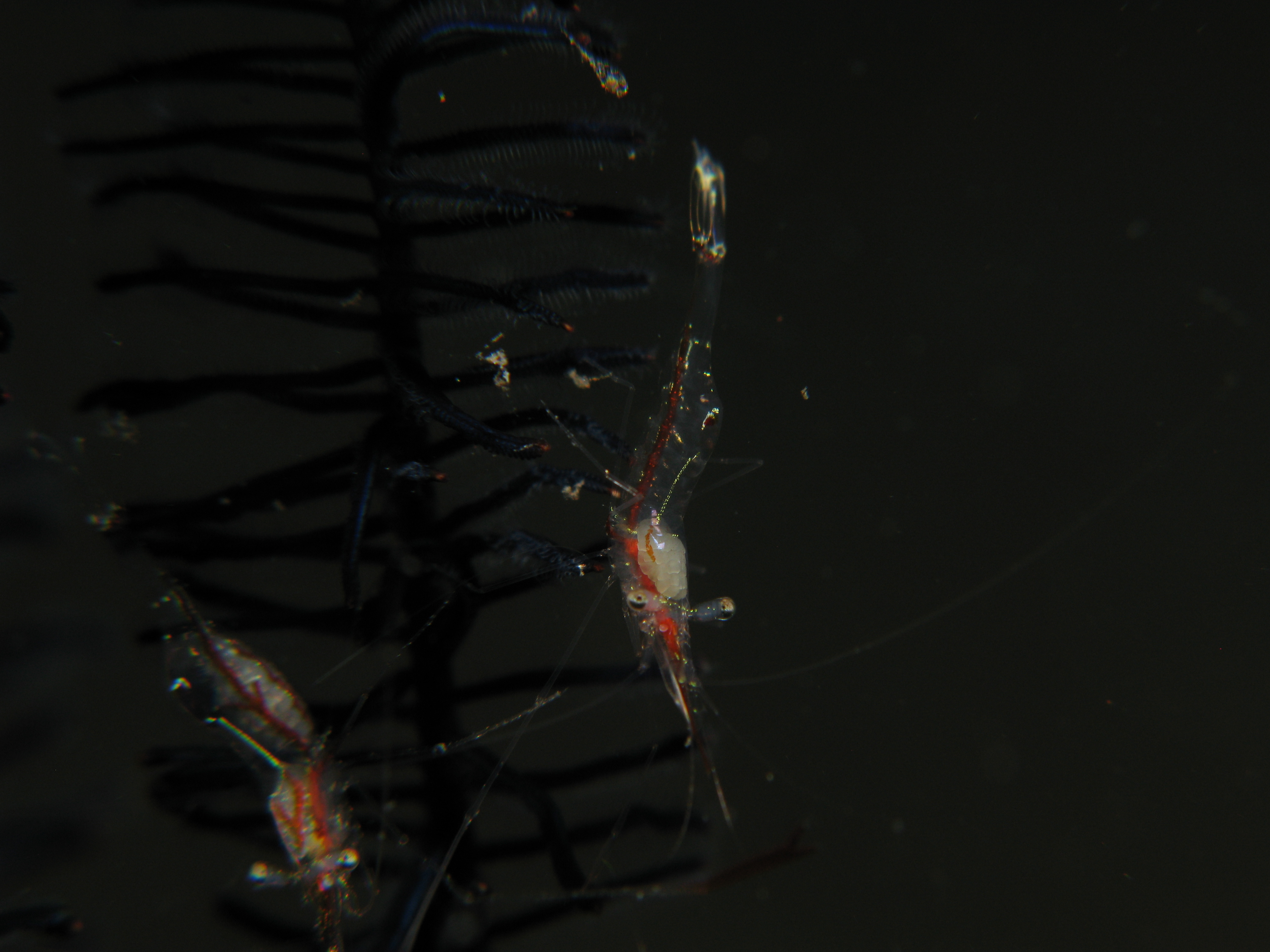

Scientific classification
- Domain: Eukaryota
- Kingdom: Animalia
- Phylum: Arthropoda
- Class: Malacostraca
- Order: Decapoda
- Suborder: Pleocyemata
- Infraorder: Caridea
- Family: Palaemonidae
- Genus: Manipontonia
- Species: M. psamathe

Binomial name
- Manipontonia psamathe de Man, 1902

= Manipontonia psamathe =

Species of crustacean

Manipontonia psamathe, the translucent Gorgonian shrimp, is a species of saltwater shrimp that was first described in 1902.

It is found in the Indo-Pacific.
