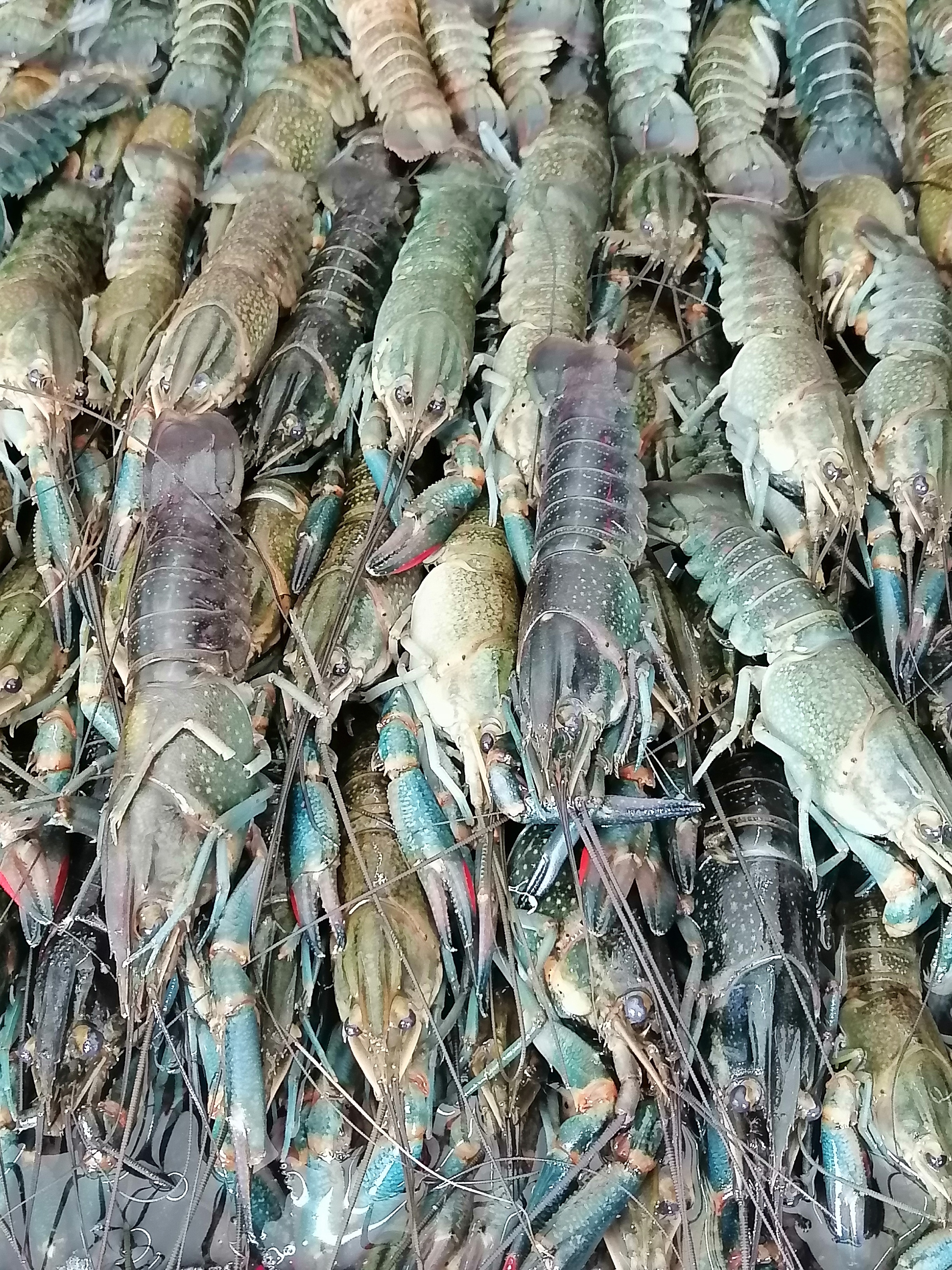

Scientific classification
- Kingdom: Animalia
- Phylum: Arthropoda
- Clade: Pancrustacea
- Class: Malacostraca
- Order: Decapoda
- Suborder: Pleocyemata
- Infraorder: Caridea
- Family: Palaemonidae
- Genus: Cryphiops
- Species: C. caementarius

Binomial name
- Cryphiops caementarius (Molina, 1782)

Synonyms
- Cancer caementarius Molina, 1782

= Cryphiops caementarius =

Species of crustacean

Cryphiops caementarius is a South American freshwater shrimp.

== Distribution ==
It is found in the rivers of Chile and Peru, where it is known as camarón de río or camarón de río del norte de Chile. The males are called changallo. The females return to the estuaries to spawn, and the larvae migrate up-river.

== Description ==
Adults reach a total length of 185 millimetres (7.3 in).

== Capture and culture ==
It is caught for food from the wild. There has been experimental aquaculture of this species. In Chile, the aquaculture production technology has been developed by the research staff of the Aquaculture Department of the Universidad Católica del Norte, trying to enhance cultivation at commercial level, obtaining a sustainable production in order to decrease the pressure on natural populations. By collecting of ovigerous females from their natural habitat, research shows that it is possible to cultivate C. caementarius juveniles in 65 days through 18 zoeal stages.
