= Crinotonia attenuatus =

Scientific classification
- Domain: Eukaryota
- Kingdom: Animalia
- Phylum: Arthropoda
- Class: Malacostraca
- Order: Decapoda
- Suborder: Pleocyemata
- Infraorder: Caridea
- Family: Palaemonidae
- Genus: Crinotonia
- Species: C. attenuatus

Binomial name
- Crinotonia attenuatus (A. J. Bruce, 1971)

Synonyms
- Periclimenes attenuatus Bruce, 1971

Species of crustacean

Crinotonia attenuatus is a species of shrimp found in the Pacific and Indian Oceans. It was first named by A. J. Bruce in 1971, as Periclimenes attenuatus.
