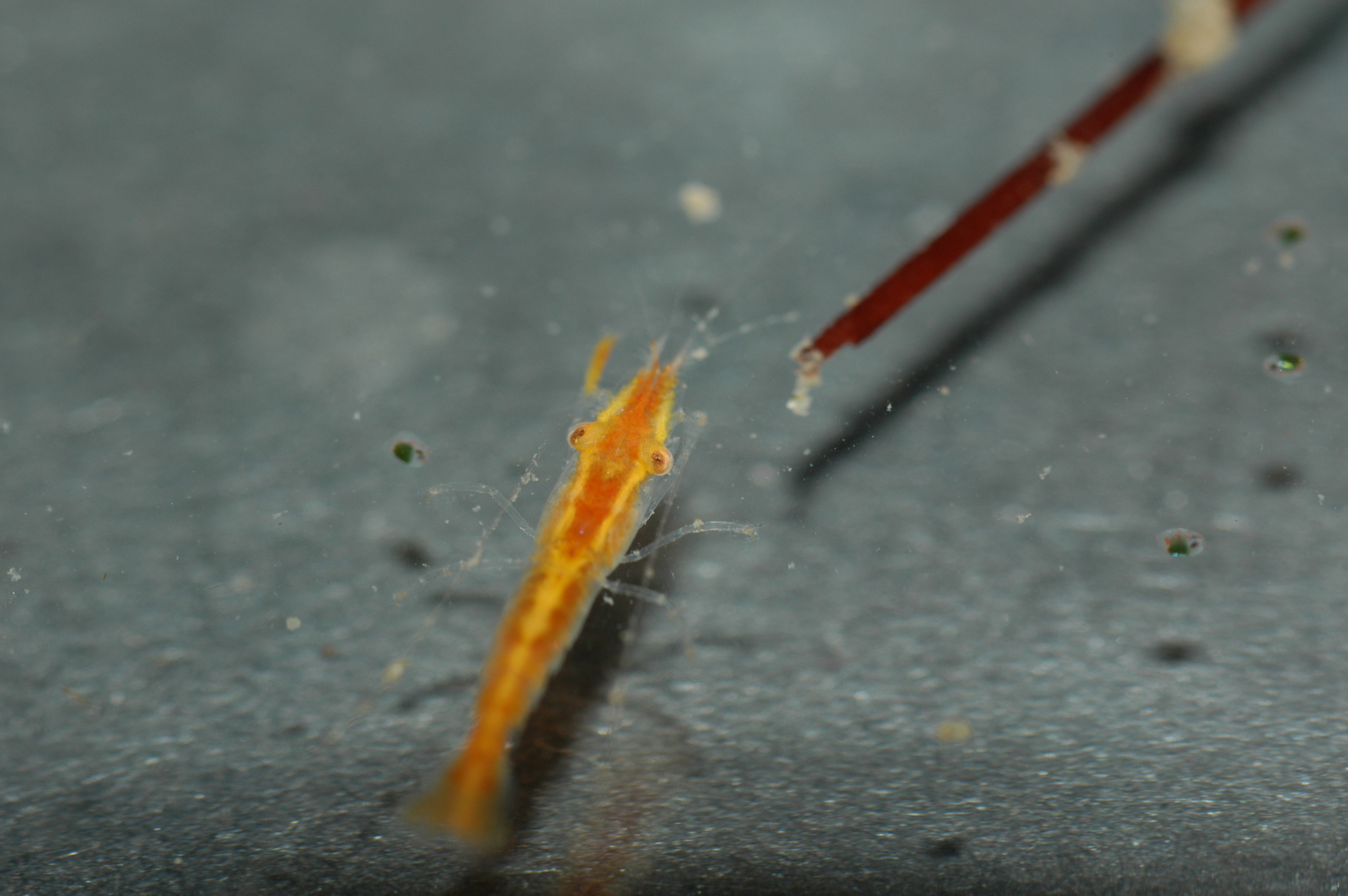

Scientific classification
- Domain: Eukaryota
- Kingdom: Animalia
- Phylum: Arthropoda
- Class: Malacostraca
- Order: Decapoda
- Suborder: Pleocyemata
- Infraorder: Caridea
- Family: Palaemonidae
- Genus: Tuleariocaris
- Species: T. neglecta

Binomial name
- Tuleariocaris neglecta Chace, 1969

= Tuleariocaris neglecta =

Species of crustacean

Tuleariocaris neglecta is a species of saltwater shrimp found in the Maldives that was first described in 1969. This species is found in the Caribbean sea, Gulf of Mexico and the Northern Atlantic Ocean.
