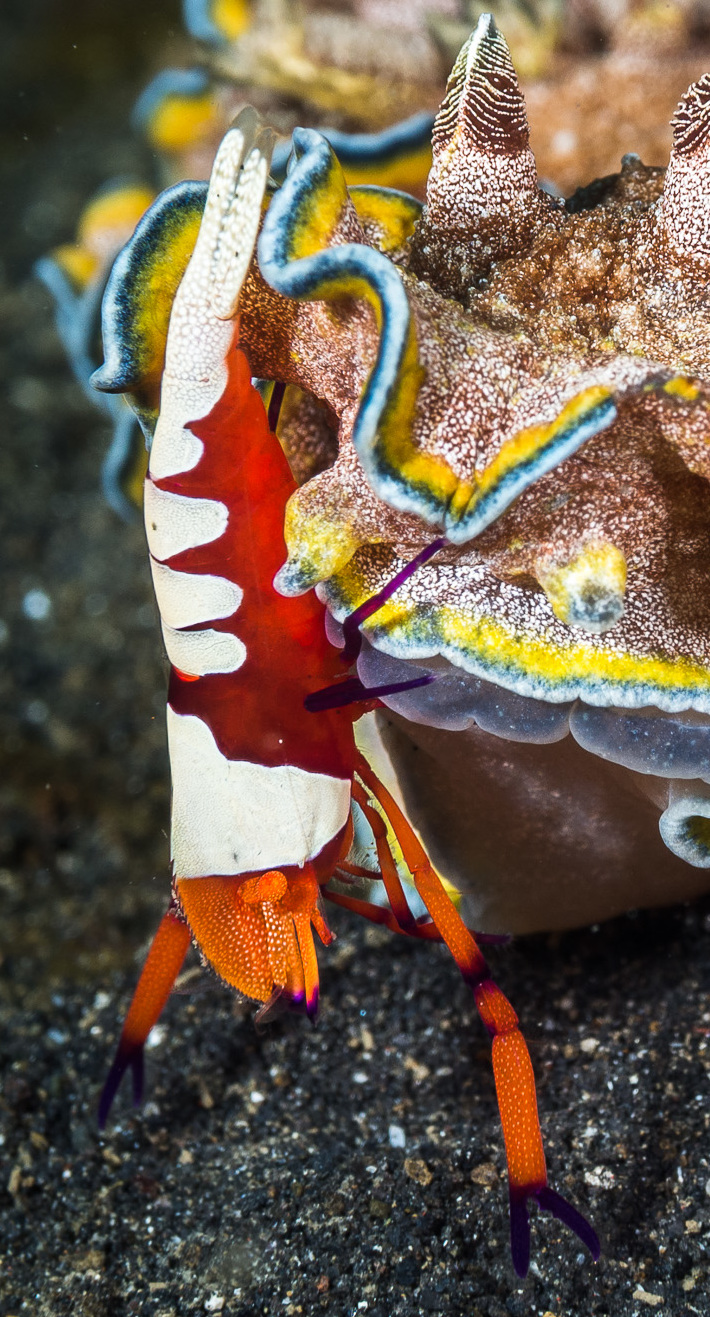
- Z. rex with the nudibranch Glossodoris cincta

Scientific classification
- Kingdom: Animalia
- Phylum: Arthropoda
- Clade: Pancrustacea
- Class: Malacostraca
- Order: Decapoda
- Suborder: Pleocyemata
- Infraorder: Caridea
- Family: Palaemonidae
- Genus: Zenopontonia
- Species: Z. rex

Binomial name
- Zenopontonia rex (Kemp, 1922)

Synonyms
- Periclimenes imperator Bruce, 1967; Periclimenes rex Kemp, 1922

= Zenopontonia rex =

Species of shrimp

Zenopontonia rex, the emperor shrimp or imperial shrimp, is a species of shrimp in the family Palaemonidae. It is found in shallow water in the tropical Indo-Pacific region. It lives in association with a sea cucumber, a nudibranch or other large mollusc.

== Description ==
Zenopontonia rex is a robust shrimp growing to a length of about 3 cm (1.2 in), with females being rather larger and slightly less colourful. The antennae are modified into a series of plates that extend forwards from the head, and the rostrum has a crest-like extension. The cephalothorax bears a small spine on either side. The first two pairs of legs bear pincers with short sensory hairs. The basic colour of this shrimp is orange-yellow to orange-red, with purple antennal plates, claws and walking legs. However, during the day, white chromatophores in the skin expand and may cover much of the dorsal surface and tail fan; in other instances, the white colour appears as a median band, and the basic orange colour is revealed elsewhere. The colouring also varies depending on the shrimp's host; the classic colouring usually occurs when it is associated with a sea cucumber, but it sometimes matches the colour of its host, particularly when associated with an opisthobranch.

== Distribution and habitat ==
Zenopontonia rex is native to the tropical Indo-Pacific region. Its range extends from the Red Sea, Réunion and Mayotte to Hawaii and French Polynesia, and from southern Japan to New Caledonia and northern Australia. It is found at depths down to about 40 m (130 ft), always living in association with a large sea cucumber, a nudibranch or other large mollusc, perching on its back as its host moves around. It lives commensally on a number of hosts, including the sea slug Hexabranchus.

== Ecology ==
Zenopontonia rex lives as a commensal on sea cucumbers such as Bohadschia, Opheodesoma, Stichopus, Synapta maculata or Thelenota, or on nudibranchs and other large molluscs including Asteronotus, Ceratosoma, Chromodoris, Cypraea, Dendrodoris, Hexabranchus, Hypselodoris and Pleurobranchus; occasionally it has been observed living in association with a starfish such as Echinaster or Gomophia. There is often a pair of shrimps, or even three, on a single host, and then they usually have identical colouring. They keep to the dorsal surface or flanks, moving to the far side of the host if danger threatens. The shrimp feeds on detritus on the seabed, as well as cleaning the surface of its host and feeding on mucus and faeces. This species is gonochoric; the male uses his first two pairs of walking legs to deposit sperm on the underside of the female's thorax, where the eggs are incubated until they hatch. The larvae are planktonic.

Recent studies have shown that the emperor shrimp display predatory habits. Such as in two occasions in Tulamben, Bali, Indonesia. In the first case, a single shrimp lived in associated with C. tenue when it attacked a small palaemonid shrimp. The second case involved two shrimps that lived symbiotically with the echinasterid sea star when it attacked a small post-larval fish. This showed that in occasions the Z. rex claws are strong enough to grip relatively large prey, they are actively searching for prey, and they are an opportunistic hunter.

It' lives in water up to 45 metres (148 ft) in depth, and can grow to a length of 1.9 centimetres (0.75 in).

== History and taxonomy ==
A. J. Bruce first described it in 1967 based on eight specimens ranging from 4 millimetres (0.16 in) to 7.6 millimetres (0.30 in).

== Gallery ==
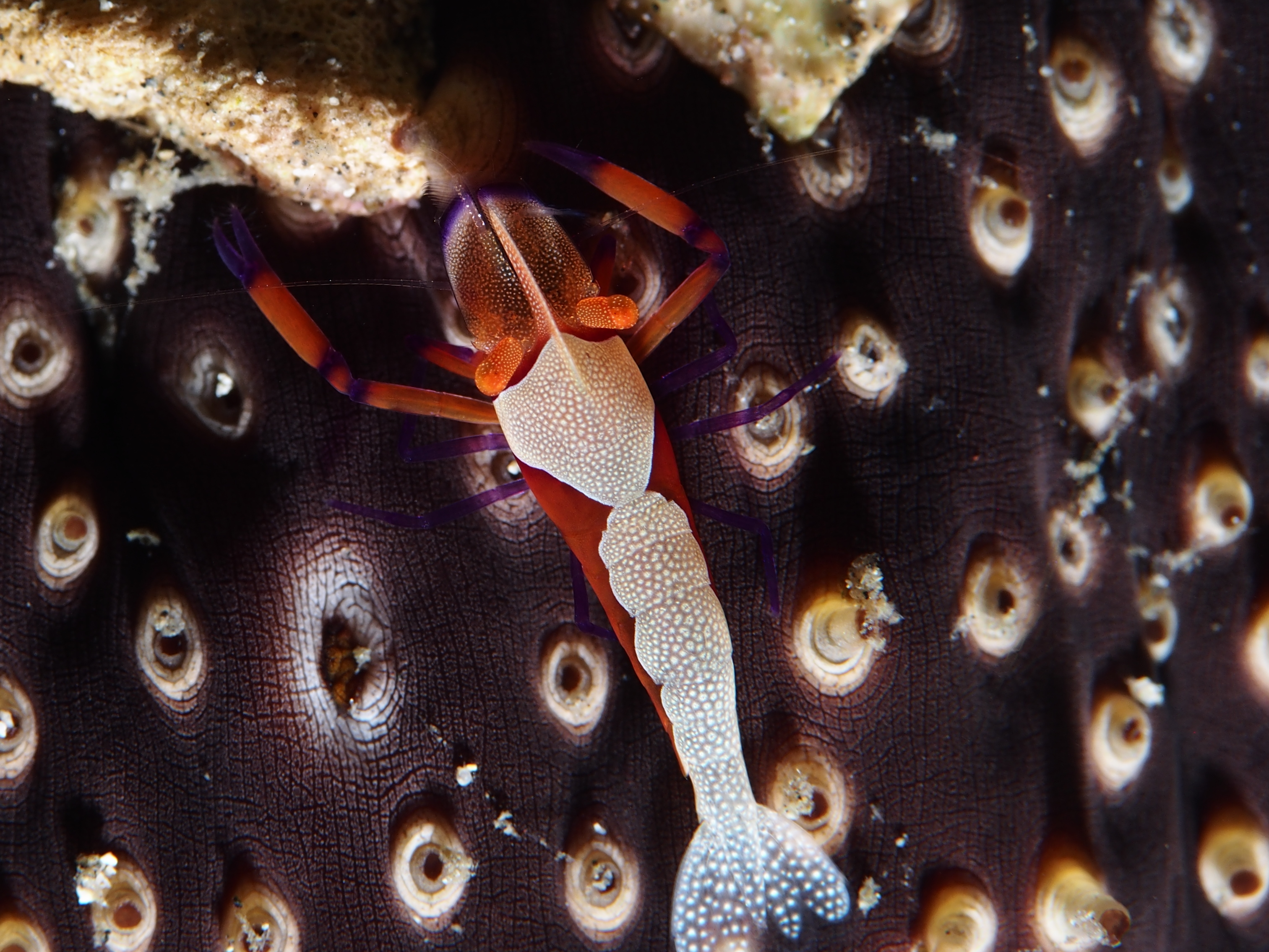
Emperor shrimp at Lembeh Sulawesi, 2014

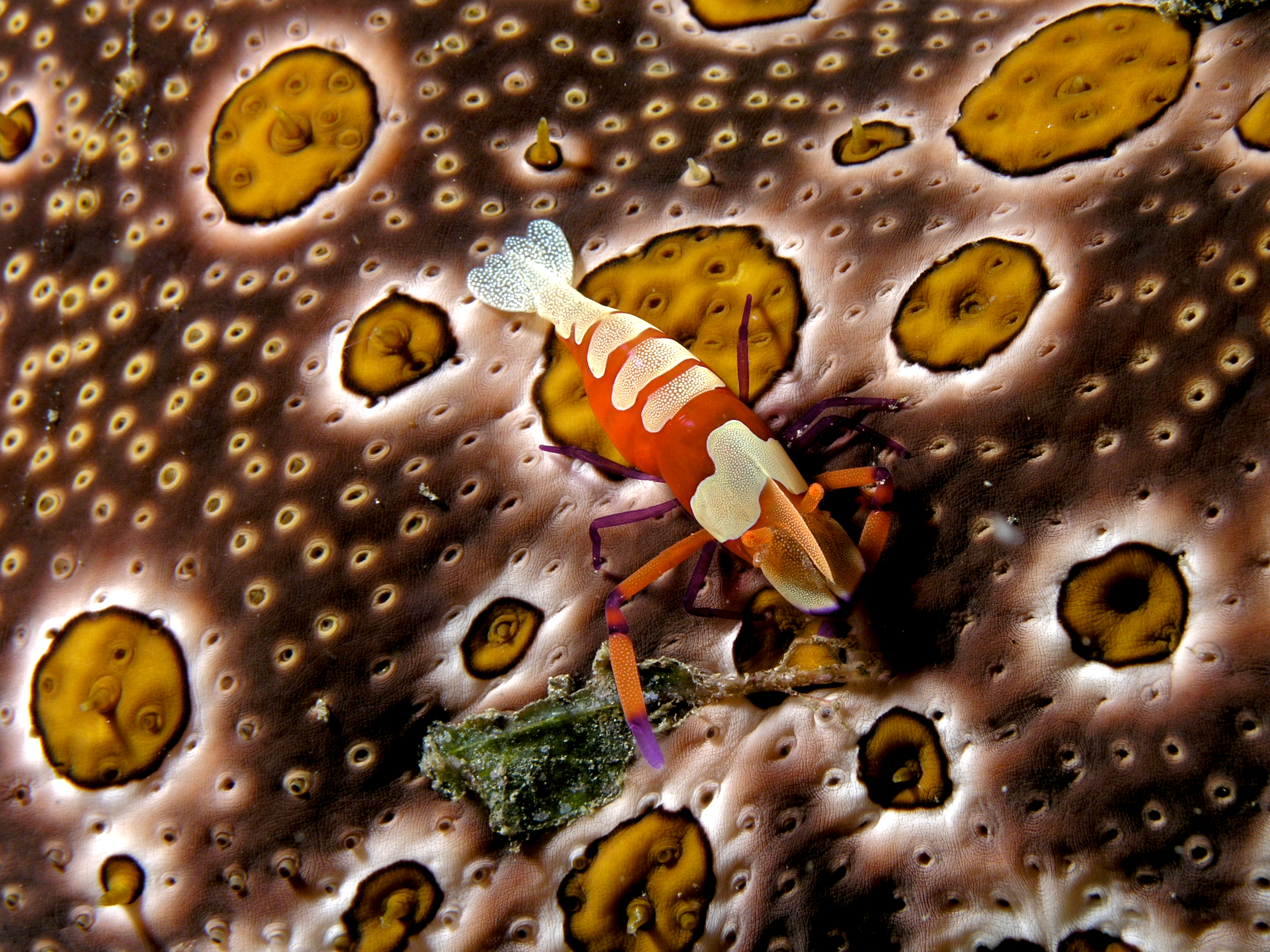
Emperor shrimp on a leopard sea cucumber (Bohadschia argus) near Dili Timor Leste, 2006

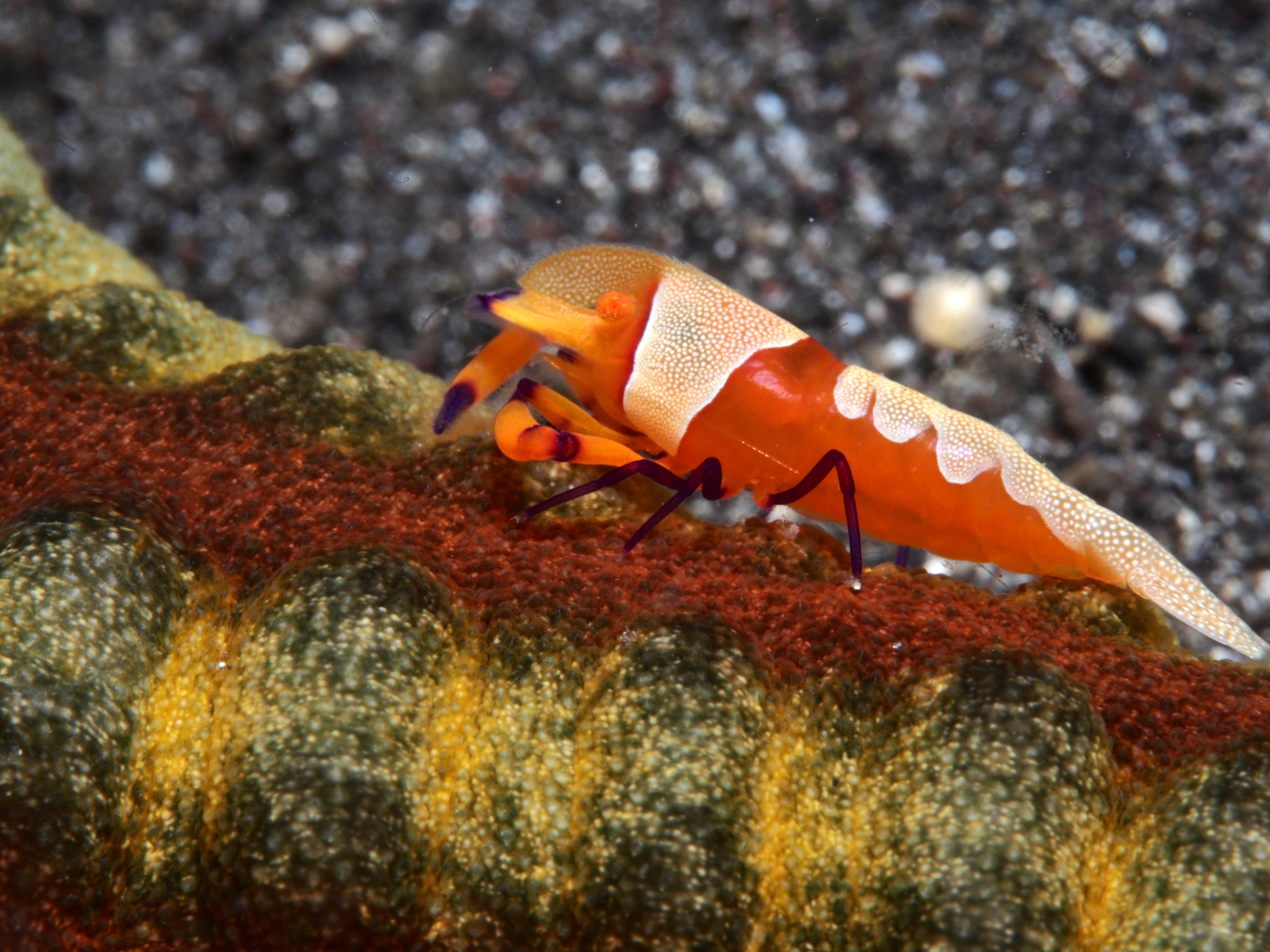
Emperor shrimp at Lembeh Sulawesi, 2016

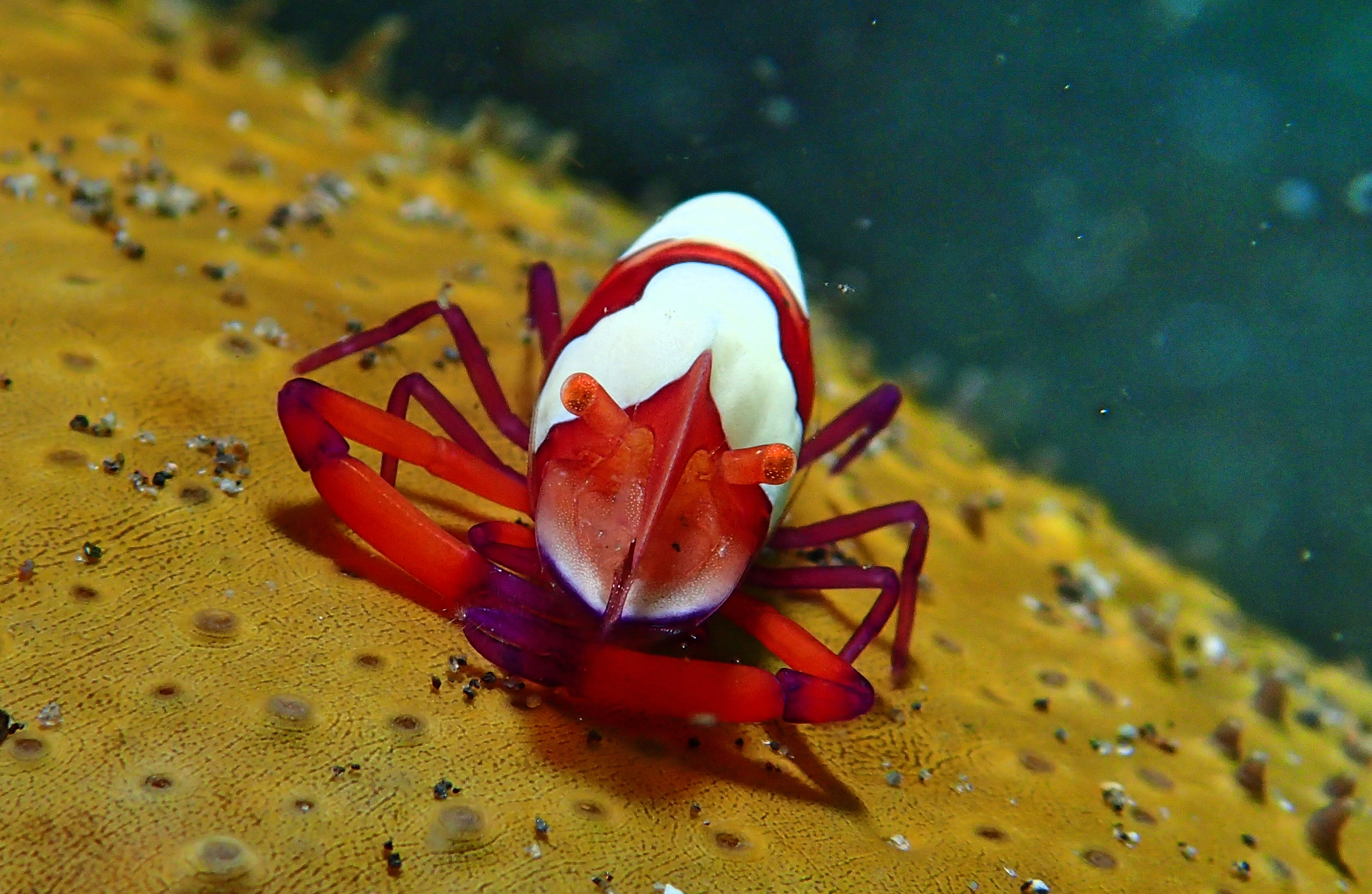
Emperor shrimp, 2018

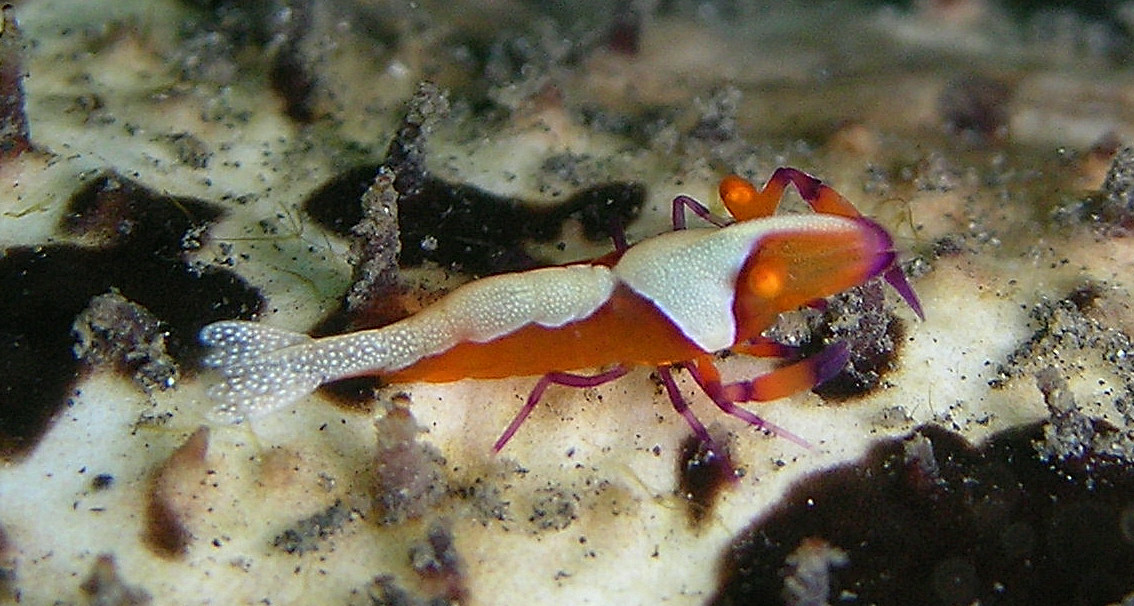
Emperor shrimp at Lembeh Sulawesi, 2008

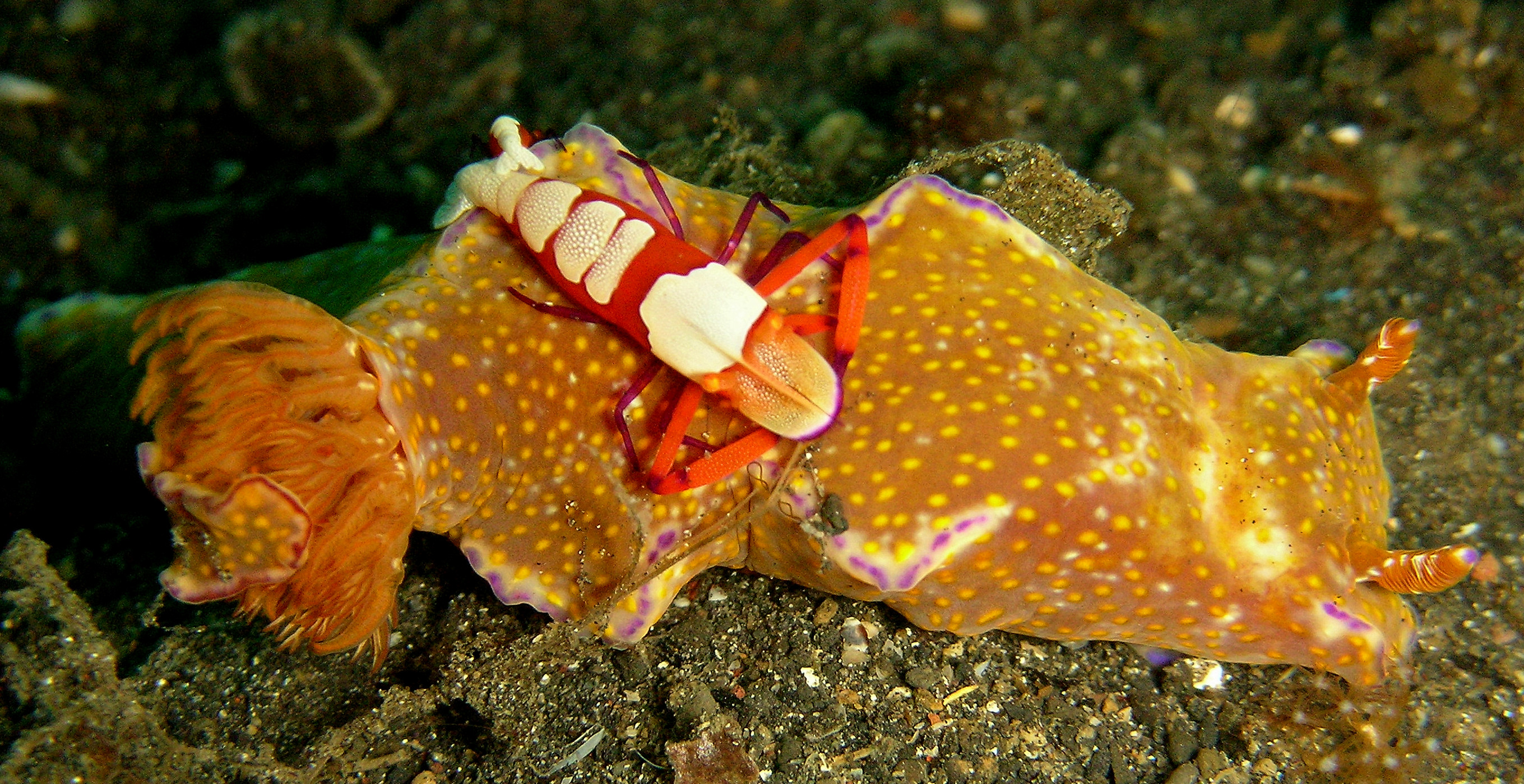
Emperor shrimp at Lembeh Sulawesi, 2008

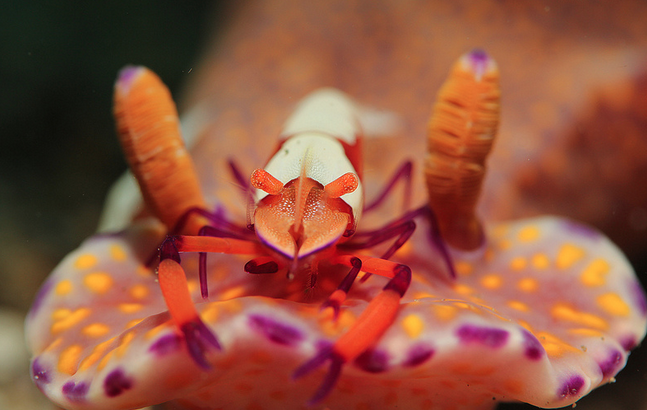
Emperor Shrimp with a Ceratosoma Tenue nudibranch as its commensal host
