= Yongjiacaris =

Yongjiacaris Temporal range: Barremian

Scientific classification
- Kingdom: Animalia
- Phylum: Arthropoda
- Class: Malacostraca
- Order: Decapoda
- Suborder: Pleocyemata
- Infraorder: Caridea
- Family: Palaemonidae
- Genus: Yongjiacaris; Garassino, Shen, Schram & Taylor, 2002
- Species: Y. zhejiangensis

Binomial name
- Yongjiacaris zhejiangensis Garassino, Shen, Schram & Taylor, 2002

Genus of Malacostraca

Yongjiacaris is an extinct genus of shrimp, which had only one species, Yongjiacaris zhejiangensis. Yongjiacaris represents the second report of freshwater caridean shrimp from the Mesozoic.

The name of the genus Yongjiacaris refers to Yongjia County, in the Zhejiang Province of China, while the species name Y. zhejiangensis is derived from the province name. Yonjiacaris was formally described by Alessandro Garassino, Shen Yanbin, Frederick R. Schram, and Rod S. Taylor in 2002. It is described from 138 specimens discovered in the C Member of the Moshishan Formation of Yongjia County, and from specimens found in the Showchang Formation near Jiande, both in southeastern China. These two correlative rock units date to the Barremian age of the Early Cretaceous; volcanic rocks in the C Member of the Moshishan Formation are dated to 120 million years old, and volcanic rocks in the Showchang Formation are dated to 118 million years ago. The C Member of the Moshishan Formation is a heterogeneous rock unit including sandstone, shale, tuff, conglomerate, and rhyolite, while the Showchang Formation is dominantly sandstone and mudstone. The types of plants present in the C Member and the Showchang Formation (relatively abundant ferns and Bennettitales, rare members of the Ginkgoaceae) and characteristics of the plants, such as leaf form and cuticle thickness, indicate a relatively hot and dry climate. The two rock units have fossil assemblages including plants, charophytes, bivalves, ostracods, conchostracans, and insects.

While other genera from the family Palaemonidae are known from the Aptian age in the lower Cretaceous period, Yongjiacaris represents the first member described from the Barremian age. It measured from 1.5 to 2 centimetres (0.6 to 0.8 in) in length.
