= Crinotonia =

Scientific classification
- Domain: Eukaryota
- Kingdom: Animalia
- Phylum: Arthropoda
- Class: Malacostraca
- Order: Decapoda
- Suborder: Pleocyemata
- Infraorder: Caridea
- Family: Palaemonidae
- Genus: Crinotonia; Marin, 2006

Species
- Crinotonia anastasiae Marin, 2006; Crinotonia attenuatus (A. J. Bruce, 1971)

Genus of Malacostraca

Crinotonia is a genus of shrimp containing the two species C. anastasiae and C. attenuatus.
