= Levicaris =

Scientific classification
- Domain: Eukaryota
- Kingdom: Animalia
- Phylum: Arthropoda
- Class: Malacostraca
- Order: Decapoda
- Suborder: Pleocyemata
- Infraorder: Caridea
- Family: Palaemonidae
- Genus: Levicaris; Bruce, 1973

Genus of shrimps

Levicaris is a genus of shrimps belonging to the family Palaemonidae.

The species of this genus are found near Japan.

Species:

- Levicaris mammillata (Edmondson, 1931)
