= Patonia =

Scientific classification
- Domain: Eukaryota
- Kingdom: Animalia
- Phylum: Arthropoda
- Class: Malacostraca
- Order: Decapoda
- Suborder: Pleocyemata
- Infraorder: Caridea
- Family: Palaemonidae
- Genus: Patonia; Mitsuhashi & Chan, 2006

Genus of shrimps

Patonia is a genus of shrimps belonging to the family Palaemonidae.

The species of this genus are found in Taiwan.

Species:

- Patonia mclaughlinae Mitsuhashi & Chan, 2006
