= Alburnia =

Alburnia Temporal range: Albian

Scientific classification
- Kingdom: Animalia
- Phylum: Arthropoda
- Class: Malacostraca
- Order: Decapoda
- Suborder: Pleocyemata
- Infraorder: Caridea
- Family: Palaemonidae
- Genus: †Alburnia; Bravi & Garassino, 1998
- Species: †A. petinensis

Binomial name
- †Alburnia petinensis Bravi & Garassino, 1998

Genus of shrimp

Alburnia is an extinct genus of shrimp in the order Decapoda. It contains the species Alburnia petinensis.
