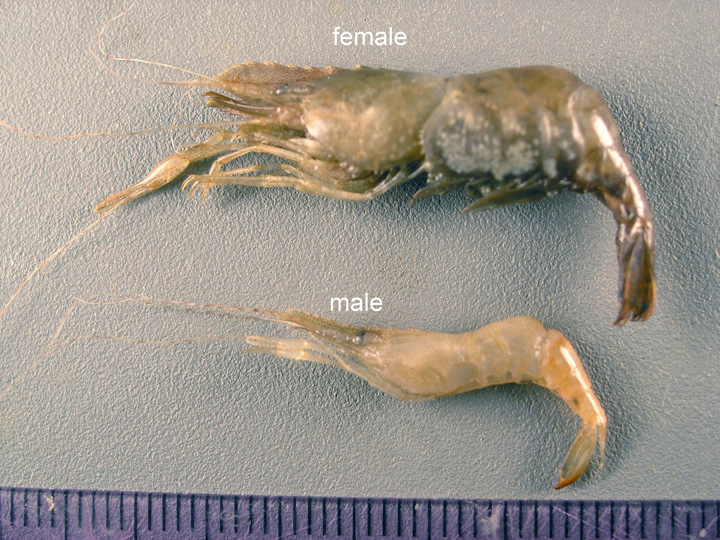
- Leander tenuicornis

Scientific classification
- Domain: Eukaryota
- Kingdom: Animalia
- Phylum: Arthropoda
- Class: Malacostraca
- Order: Decapoda
- Suborder: Pleocyemata
- Infraorder: Caridea
- Family: Palaemonidae
- Genus: Leander; Desmarest, 1849

= Leander (crustacean) =

Genus of shrimps

Leander is a genus of shrimp belonging to the family Palaemonidae.

The genus has almost cosmopolitan distribution.

Species:

- Leander distans Heller, 1862
- Leander hammondii Kingsley, 1883
- Leander indicus Heller, 1862
- Leander kempi Holthuis, 1950
- Leander manningi Bruce, 2002
- Leander paulensis Ortmann, 1897
- Leander plumosus Bruce, 1994
- Leander tenuicornis Say, 1818
