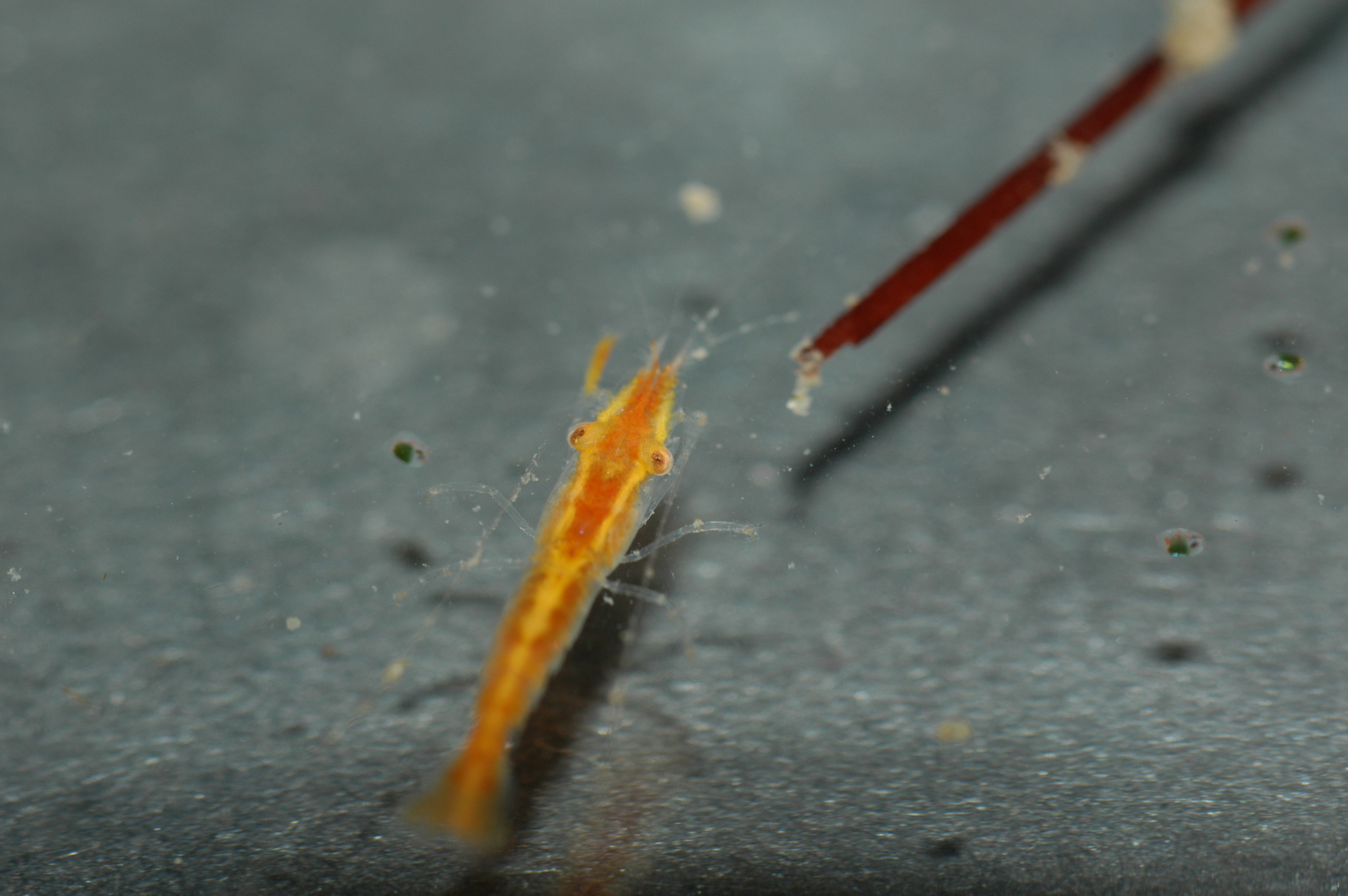
- Tuleariocaris neglecta

Scientific classification
- Domain: Eukaryota
- Kingdom: Animalia
- Phylum: Arthropoda
- Class: Malacostraca
- Order: Decapoda
- Suborder: Pleocyemata
- Infraorder: Caridea
- Family: Palaemonidae
- Genus: Tuleariocaris; Hipeau-Jacquotte, 1965

= Tuleariocaris =

Genus of crustaceans

Tuleariocaris is a genus of shrimp comprising the following species:

- Tuleariocaris holthuisi Hipeau-Jacquotte, 1965
- Tuleariocaris neglecta Chace, 1969
- Tuleariocaris sarec Berggren, 1994
- Tuleariocaris zanzibarica Bruce, 1967
