= Neopontonides =

Scientific classification
- Domain: Eukaryota
- Kingdom: Animalia
- Phylum: Arthropoda
- Class: Malacostraca
- Order: Decapoda
- Suborder: Pleocyemata
- Infraorder: Caridea
- Family: Palaemonidae
- Genus: Neopontonides; Holthuis, 1951

Genus of shrimps

Neopontonides is a genus of shrimps belonging to the family Palaemonidae.

The species of this genus are found in Central America.

Species:

- Neopontonides beaufortensis (Borradaile, 1920)
- Neopontonides brucei Fransen & de Almeida, 2009
- Neopontonides chacei Heard, 1986
- Neopontonides dentiger Holthuis, 1951
- Neopontonides henryvonprahli Ramos, 1995
