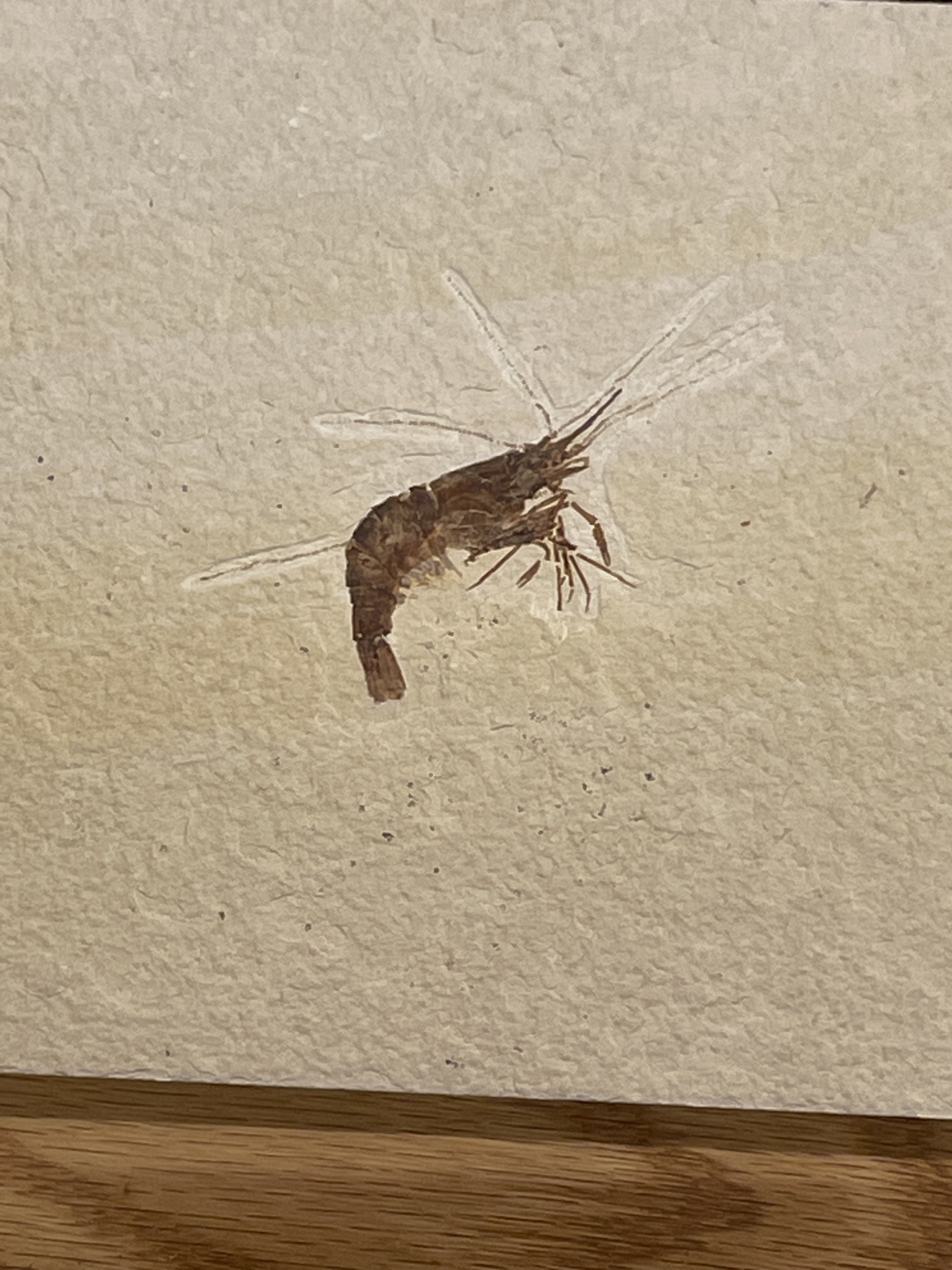
- Specimen of Bechleja rostrata from the Eocene Green River Formation of Wyoming

Scientific classification
- Kingdom: Animalia
- Phylum: Arthropoda
- Class: Malacostraca
- Order: Decapoda
- Suborder: Pleocyemata
- Infraorder: Caridea
- Family: Palaemonidae
- Genus: †Bechleja; Houša, 1957

= Bechleja =

Bechleja Temporal range: Eocene

Genus of Malacostraca

Bechleja is an extinct genus of shrimp which existed during the Eocene period. It contains four species.
