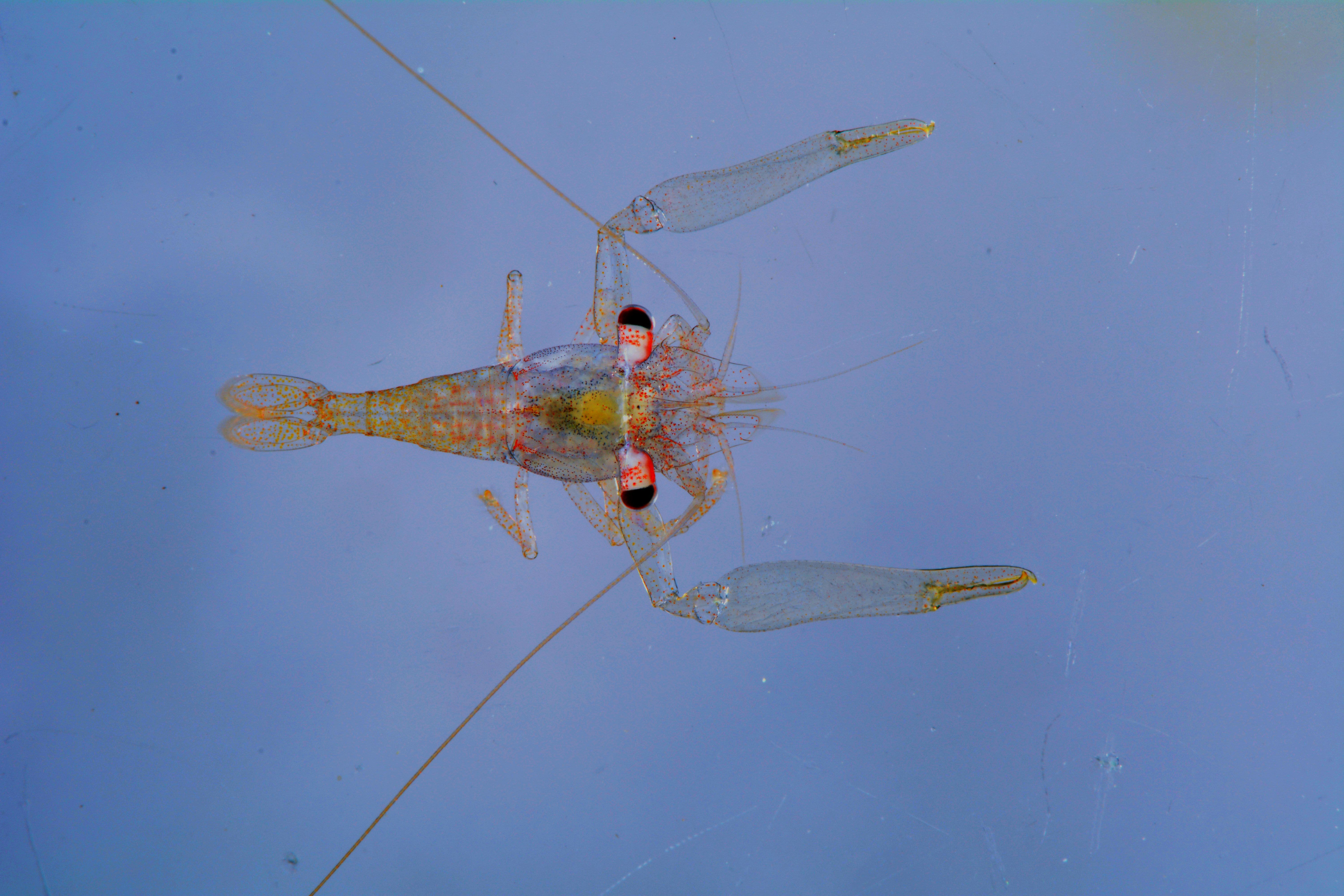
- Coralliocaris sandyi

Scientific classification
- Kingdom: Animalia
- Phylum: Arthropoda
- Class: Malacostraca
- Order: Decapoda
- Suborder: Pleocyemata
- Infraorder: Caridea
- Family: Palaemonidae
- Genus: Coralliocaris; Stimpson, 1860

Synonyms
- Oedipus Dana, 1852

= Coralliocaris =

Genus of crustaceans

Coralliocaris is a genus of shrimps belonging to the family Palaemonidae.

The species of this genus are found in Indian and Pacific Ocean.

Species:

- Coralliocaris brevirostris Borradaile, 1898
- Coralliocaris graminea (Dana, 1852)
- Coralliocaris junckeri Li & Poupin, 2012
- Coralliocaris labyrintha Mitsuhashi & Takeda, 2008
- Coralliocaris macrophthalma (Milne Edwards, 1837)
- Coralliocaris macropthalma (Milne Edwards, 1837)
- Coralliocaris nudirostris (Heller, 1861)
- Coralliocaris sandyi Mitsuhashi & Takeda, 2008
- Coralliocaris superba (Dana, 1852)
- Coralliocaris taiwanensis Fujino & Miyake, 1972
- Coralliocaris tridens Mitsuhashi, Fujino & Takeda, 2001
- Coralliocaris viridis Bruce, 1974
