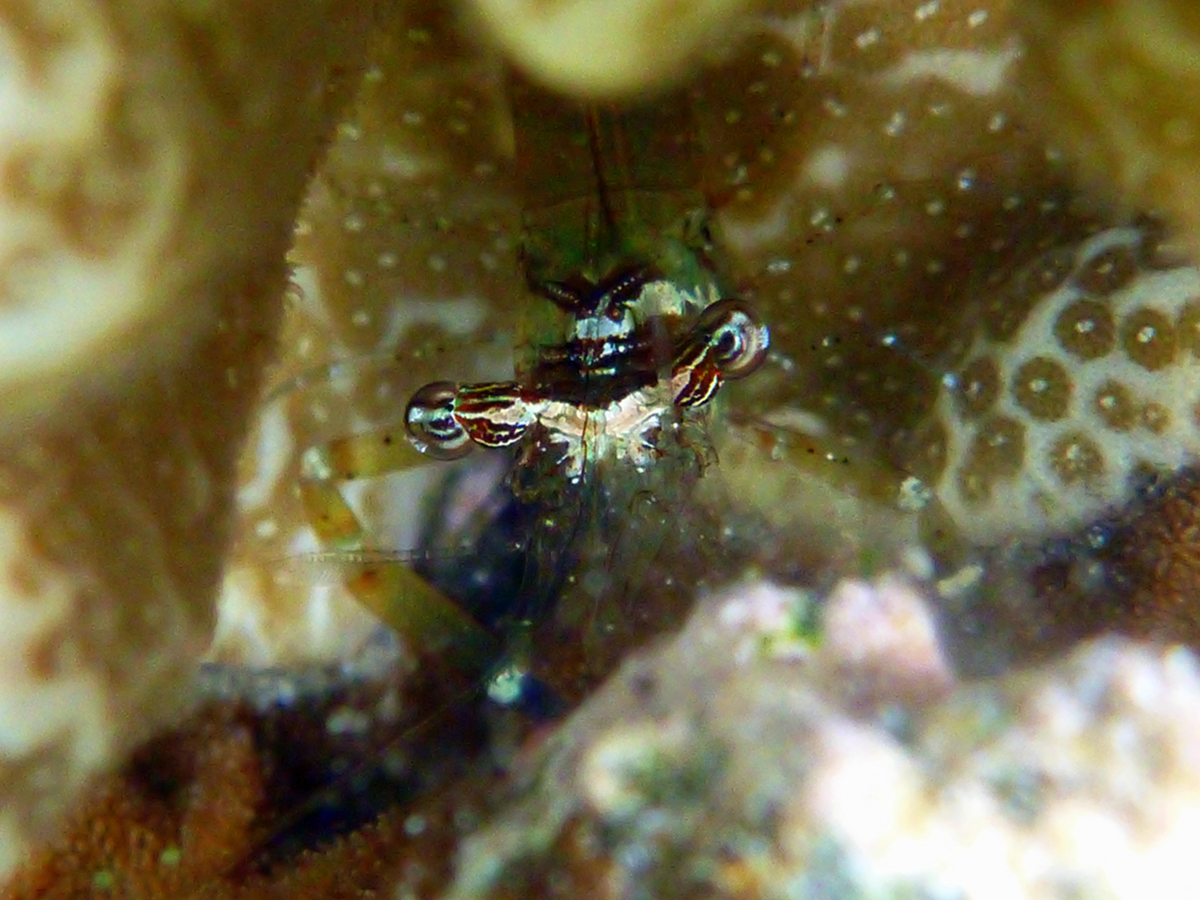
- Periclimenella spinifera

Scientific classification
- Domain: Eukaryota
- Kingdom: Animalia
- Phylum: Arthropoda
- Class: Malacostraca
- Order: Decapoda
- Suborder: Pleocyemata
- Infraorder: Caridea
- Family: Palaemonidae
- Genus: Periclimenella; Bruce, 1995

= Periclimenella =

Genus of shrimps

Periclimenella is a genus of shrimps belonging to the family Palaemonidae.

The species of this genus are found in Indian Ocean, Southeastern Asia and Australia.

Species:

- Periclimenella agattii Bharati, Purushothaman, Akash, Jose, Madhavan, Dhinakaran, Saravanane, Ajith Kumar & Kumar Lal, 2019
- Periclimenella petitthouarsii (Audouin, 1826)
- Periclimenella spinifera (de Man, 1902)
