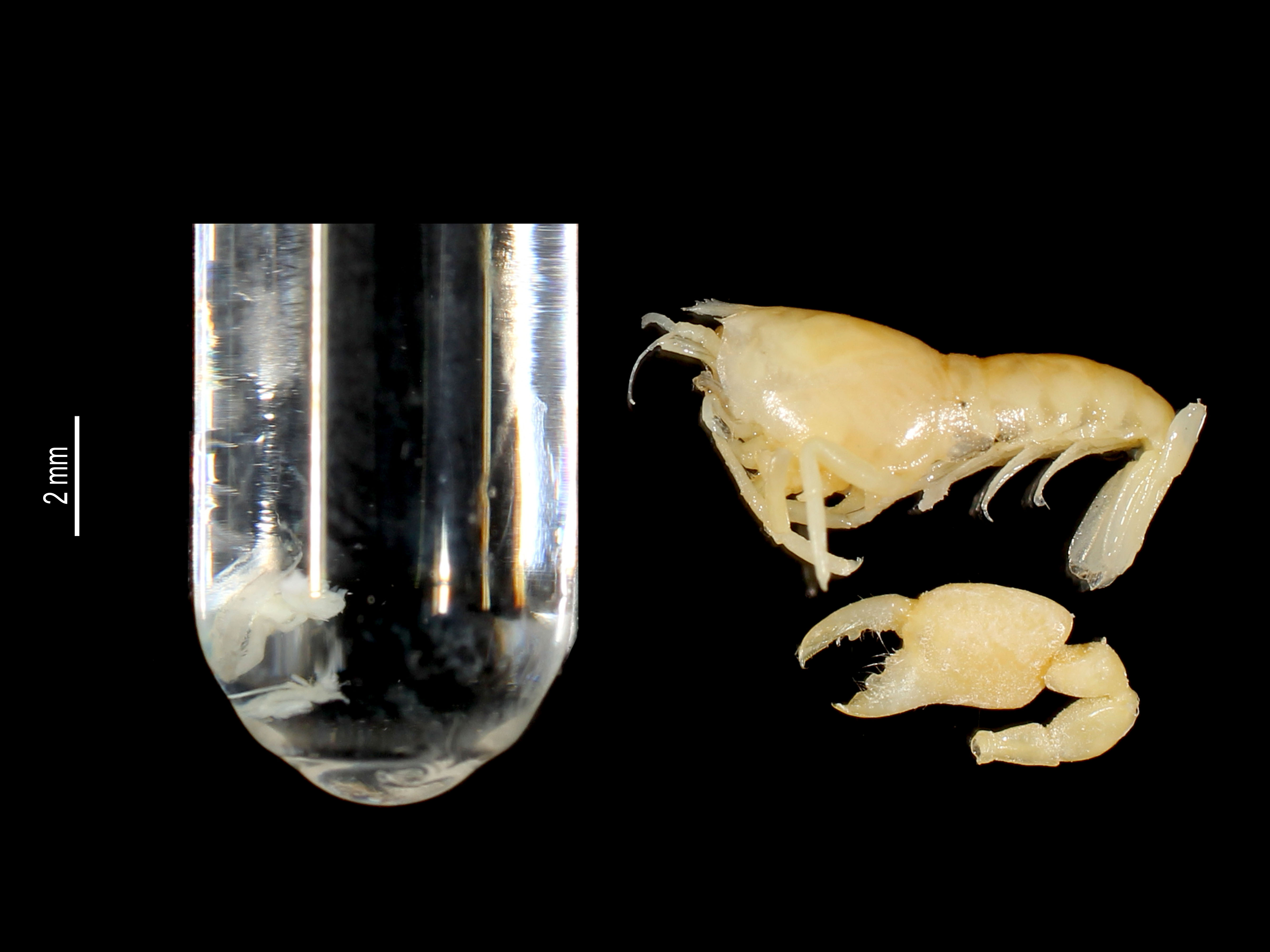
- Onycocaris longirostris

Scientific classification
- Domain: Eukaryota
- Kingdom: Animalia
- Phylum: Arthropoda
- Class: Malacostraca
- Order: Decapoda
- Suborder: Pleocyemata
- Infraorder: Caridea
- Family: Palaemonidae
- Genus: Onycocaris; Nobili, 1904

Type species
- Coralliocaris aualitica Nobili, 1904

Synonyms
- Coralliocaris Nobili, 1904

= Onycocaris =

Genus of crustaceans

Onycocaris is a genus of shrimp within the family Palaemonidae. There are currently 22 species assigned to the genus, with members spanning through areas off Kenya, Tanzania, Australia, and New Caledonia.

== Species ==
- Onycocaris amakusensis Fujino & Miyake, 1969
- Onycocaris aualitica (Nobili, 1904)
- Onycocaris balssi Bruce, 2011
- Onycocaris bocki Bruce, 1992
- Onycocaris callyspongiae Fujino & Miyake, 1969
- Onycocaris fujinoi Bruce, 2011
- Onycocaris furculata Bruce, 1979
- Onycocaris hayamaensis Komai & Itou, 2012
- Onycocaris longirostris Bruce, 1980
- Onycocaris maui Bruce, 2013
- Onycocaris nieli Bruce, 2011
- Onycocaris oligodentata Fujino & Miyake, 1969
- Onycocaris profunda Bruce, 1985
- Onycocaris quadratophthalma (Balss, 1921)
- Onycocaris rudolfi Marin, 2015
- Onycocaris seychellensis Bruce, 1971
- Onycocaris spinosa Fujino & Miyake, 1969
- Onycocaris stradbrokei Bruce, 1998
- Onycocaris temiri Marin, 2005
- Onycocaris trullata Bruce, 1978
- Onycocaris zanzibarica Bruce, 1971
- Onycocaris zarenkovi Marin, 2015
