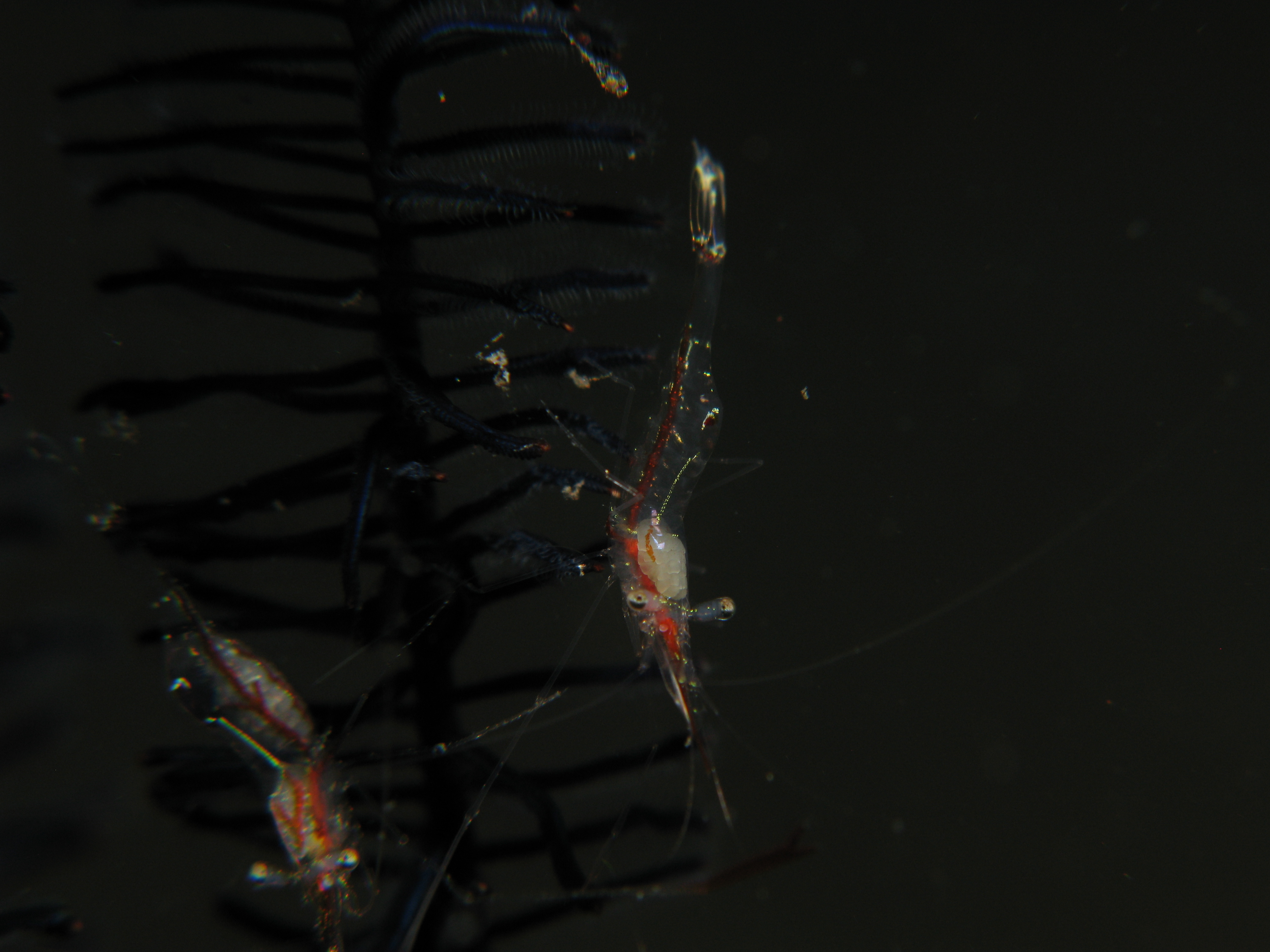
- The symbiotic shrimp Manipontonia psamathe over a feather star.

Scientific classification
- Domain: Eukaryota
- Kingdom: Animalia
- Phylum: Arthropoda
- Class: Malacostraca
- Order: Decapoda
- Suborder: Pleocyemata
- Infraorder: Caridea
- Family: Palaemonidae
- Genus: Manipontonia; Bruce, Okuno & Li, 2005

= Manipontonia =

Genus of crustaceans

Manipontonia is a genus of shrimp comprising the following species:

- Manipontonia paeneglabra Bruce, 2012
- Manipontonia persiana Marin, 2010
- Manipontonia psamathe (de Man, 1902)
