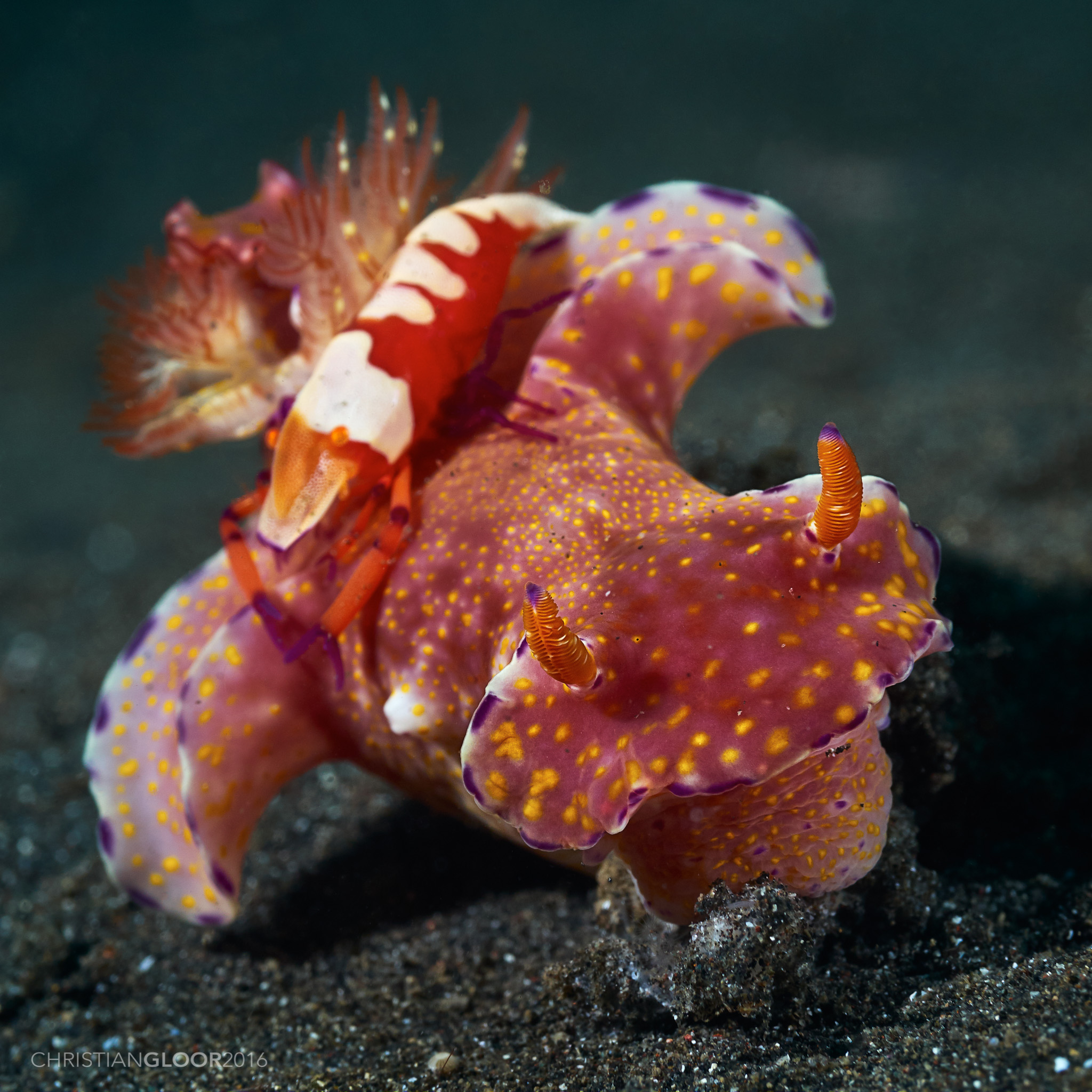
- Zenopontonia rex on a sea slug Ceratosoma trilobatum.

Scientific classification
- Domain: Eukaryota
- Kingdom: Animalia
- Phylum: Arthropoda
- Class: Malacostraca
- Order: Decapoda
- Suborder: Pleocyemata
- Infraorder: Caridea
- Family: Palaemonidae
- Genus: Zenopontonia; Bruce, 1975

Type species
- Periclimenes (Periclimenes) noverca Kemp, 1922

= Zenopontonia =

Genus of crustaceans

Zenopontonia is a genus of shrimp within the family Palaemonidae.

== Species ==
The World Register of Marine Species lists the following species:-

- Zenopontonia noverca (Kemp, 1922)
- Zenopontonia rex (Kemp, 1922)
- Zenopontonia soror (Nobili, 1904)
