= Chacella =

Scientific classification
- Domain: Eukaryota
- Kingdom: Animalia
- Phylum: Arthropoda
- Class: Malacostraca
- Order: Decapoda
- Suborder: Pleocyemata
- Infraorder: Caridea
- Family: Palaemonidae
- Genus: Chacella; Bruce, 1986

Genus of crustaceans

Chacella is a genus of shrimps belonging to the family Palaemonidae.

The species of this genus are found in Western Northern America.

Species:

- Chacella kerstitchi (Wicksten, 1983)
