= Gnathophylleptum =

Scientific classification
- Domain: Eukaryota
- Kingdom: Animalia
- Phylum: Arthropoda
- Class: Malacostraca
- Order: Decapoda
- Suborder: Pleocyemata
- Infraorder: Caridea
- Family: Palaemonidae
- Genus: Gnathophylleptum; Schmitt, 1933

Genus of crustaceans

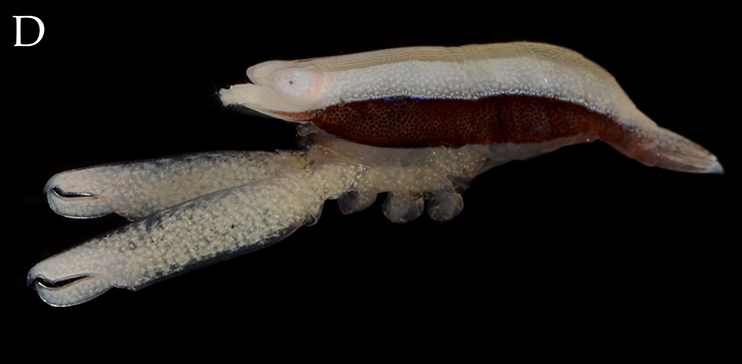
Gnathophylloides

Gnathophylleptum is a genus of shrimps belonging to the family Palaemonidae.

The species of this genus are found in Central America, Southeastern Asia and Australia.

Species:

- Gnathophylloides mineri Schmitt, 1933
- Gnathophylloides robustus Bruce, 1973
