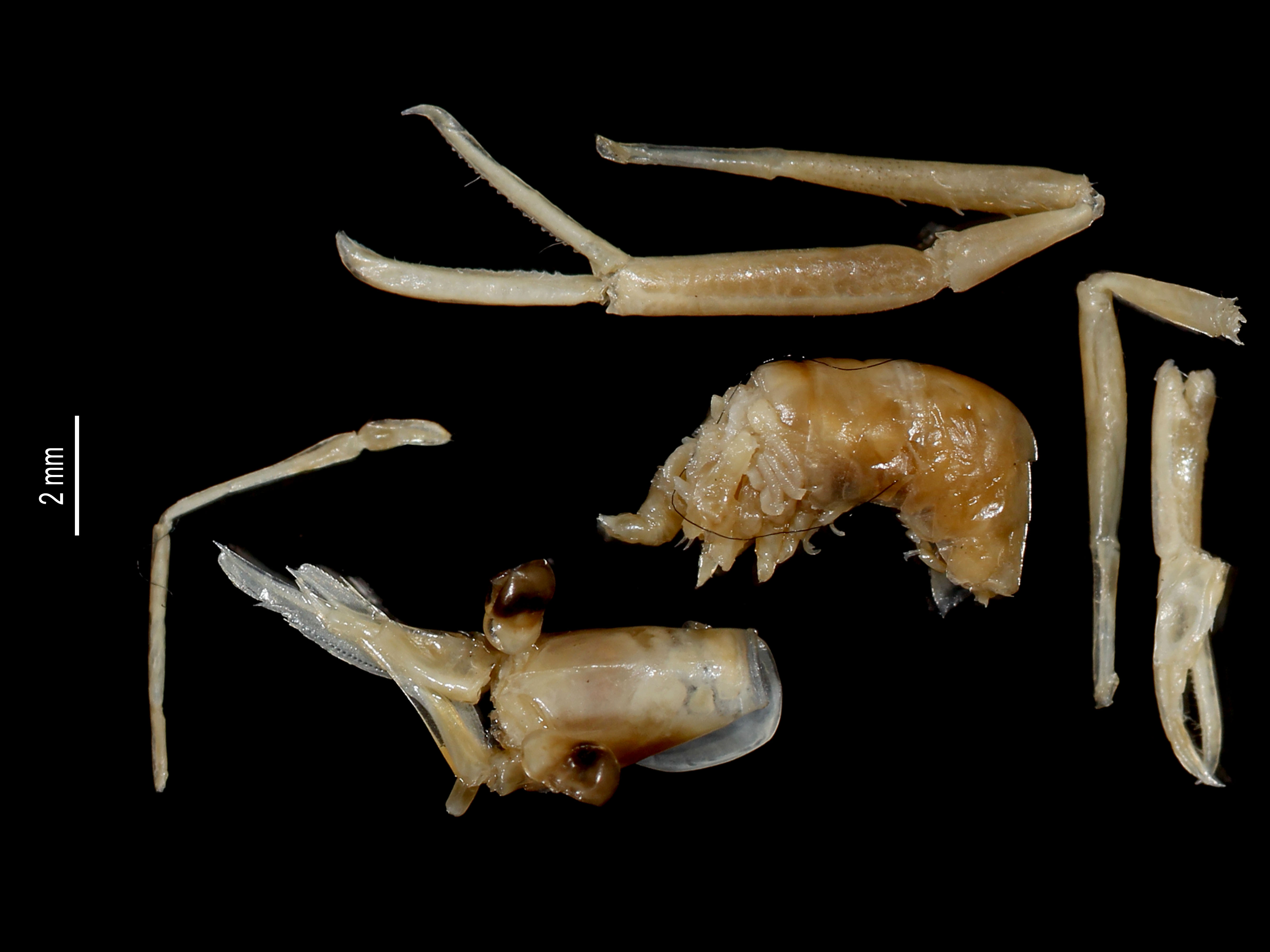
- Preserved specimen of exoclimenella denticulata.

Scientific classification
- Domain: Eukaryota
- Kingdom: Animalia
- Phylum: Arthropoda
- Class: Malacostraca
- Order: Decapoda
- Suborder: Pleocyemata
- Infraorder: Caridea
- Family: Palaemonidae
- Genus: Exoclimenella; Bruce, 1995

= Exoclimenella =

Genus of shrimps

Exoclimenella is a genus of shrimps belonging to the family Palaemonidae.

The species of this genus are found in Madagascar, Arabian Peninsula, Pacific Ocean.

Species:

- Exoclimenella denticulata (Nobili, 1906)
- Exoclimenella maldivensis Ďuriš & Bruce, 1995
- Exoclimenella sibogae (Holthuis, 1952)
- Exoclimenella sudanensis Ďuriš & Bruce, 1995
