= Pycnocaris =

Pycnocaris chagoe

Scientific classification
- Kingdom: Animalia
- Phylum: Arthropoda
- Clade: Pancrustacea
- Class: Malacostraca
- Order: Decapoda
- Suborder: Pleocyemata
- Infraorder: Caridea
- Family: Palaemonidae
- Genus: Pycnocaris
- Species: P. chagoe

Binomial name
- Pycnocaris chagoe Bruce, 1972

Species of shrimp

Pycnocaris is a monotypic genus of shrimp belonging to the family Palaemonidae. Pycnocaris chagoe is the only known species in this genus.
