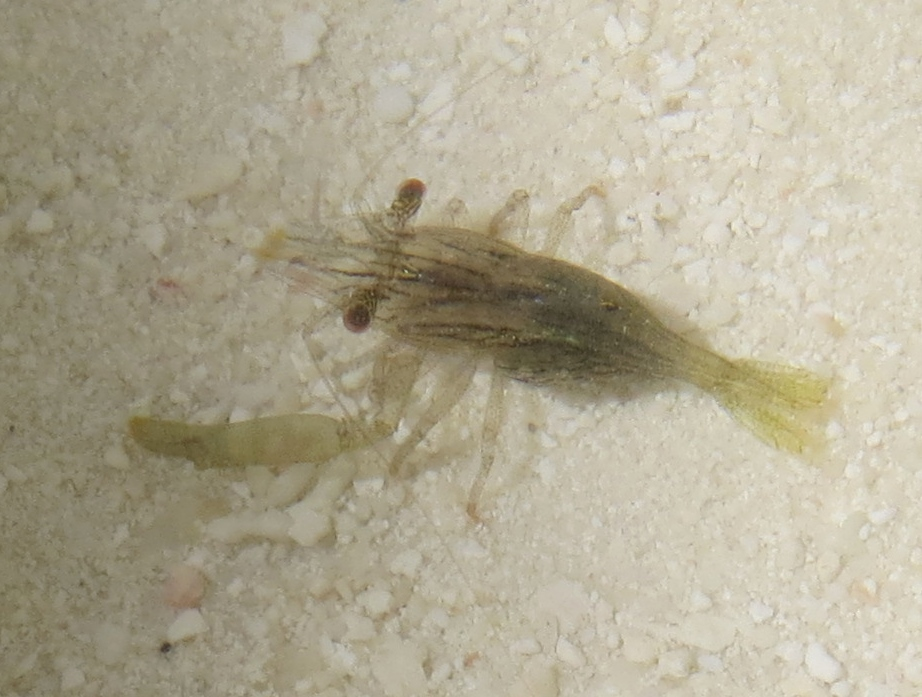
- Harpiliopsis beaupresii

Scientific classification
- Domain: Eukaryota
- Kingdom: Animalia
- Phylum: Arthropoda
- Class: Malacostraca
- Order: Decapoda
- Suborder: Pleocyemata
- Infraorder: Caridea
- Family: Palaemonidae
- Genus: Harpiliopsis; Borradaile, 1917

Type species
- Palaemon beaupressi Audouin, 1826

Species
- Harpiliopsis beaupresii (Audouin, 1826); Harpiliopsis depressa (Stimpson, 1860); Harpiliopsis spinigera (Ortmann, 1890)

Synonyms
- Harpilopsis Borradaile, 1917

= Harpiliopsis =

Genus of shrimps

== Description ==
Harpiliopsis, meaning "harp-like form," is a genus of small shrimp belonging to the family Palaemonidae. They're known as flattened coral shrimp due to their laterally compressed bodies, adapted for life in coral reefs and crevices.

== Etymology ==
The genus name "Harpiliopsis" has its etymological roots in Greek. The term is a combination of two Greek words:

1. Harpilos (ἁρπυλίς): This word in Greek refers to a harpy or a mythical creature with the body of a bird and the face of a woman. Harpies were often depicted as wind spirits and were associated with stormy weather.
2. -opsis (-οπσις): The suffix "-opsis" is of Greek origin and is commonly used in taxonomy to indicate resemblance or appearance. In the context of genus names in biology, it often implies a similarity or likeness to another organism or group.
