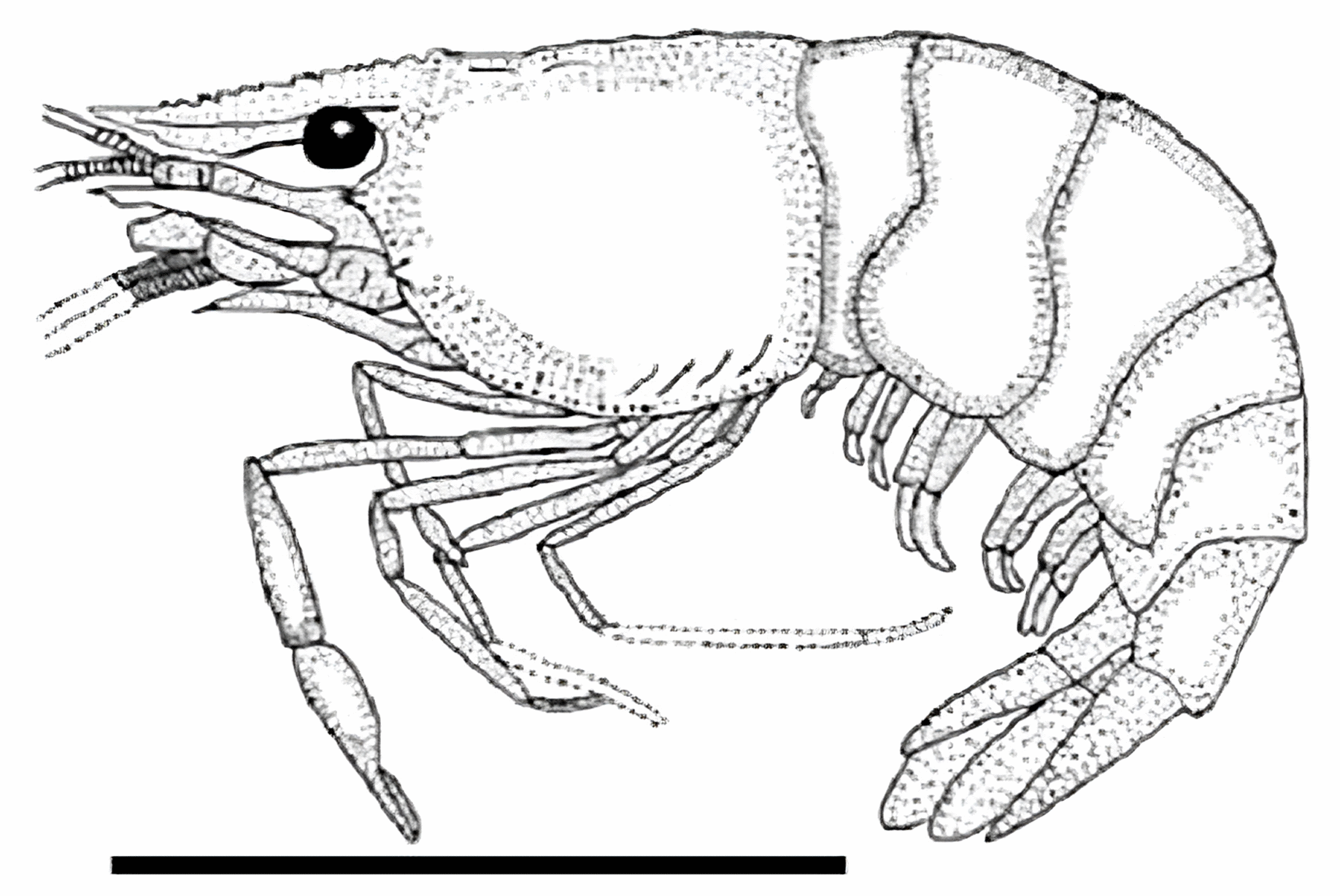

Scientific classification
- Kingdom: Animalia
- Phylum: Arthropoda
- Class: Malacostraca
- Order: Decapoda
- Suborder: Pleocyemata
- Infraorder: Caridea
- Family: Palaemonidae
- Genus: Beurlenia; Martins-Neto & Mezzalira, 1991
- Species: B. araripensis

Binomial name
- Beurlenia araripensis Martins-Neto & Mezzalira, 1991

= Beurlenia =

Beurlenia Temporal range: Aptian-Albian

Genus of Malacostraca

Beurlenia is an extinct genus of shrimp containing the species Beurlenia araripensis. It is named after the German palaeontologist Karl Beurlen (1901–1985). Fossils of the shrimp were found in the Crato Formation of the Araripe Basin of northeastern Brazil. A study on the anatomy and morphological variation in Beurlenia araripensis, based on data from fossil samples from the Crato Formation (Brazil), was published by Barros et al. (2021).
