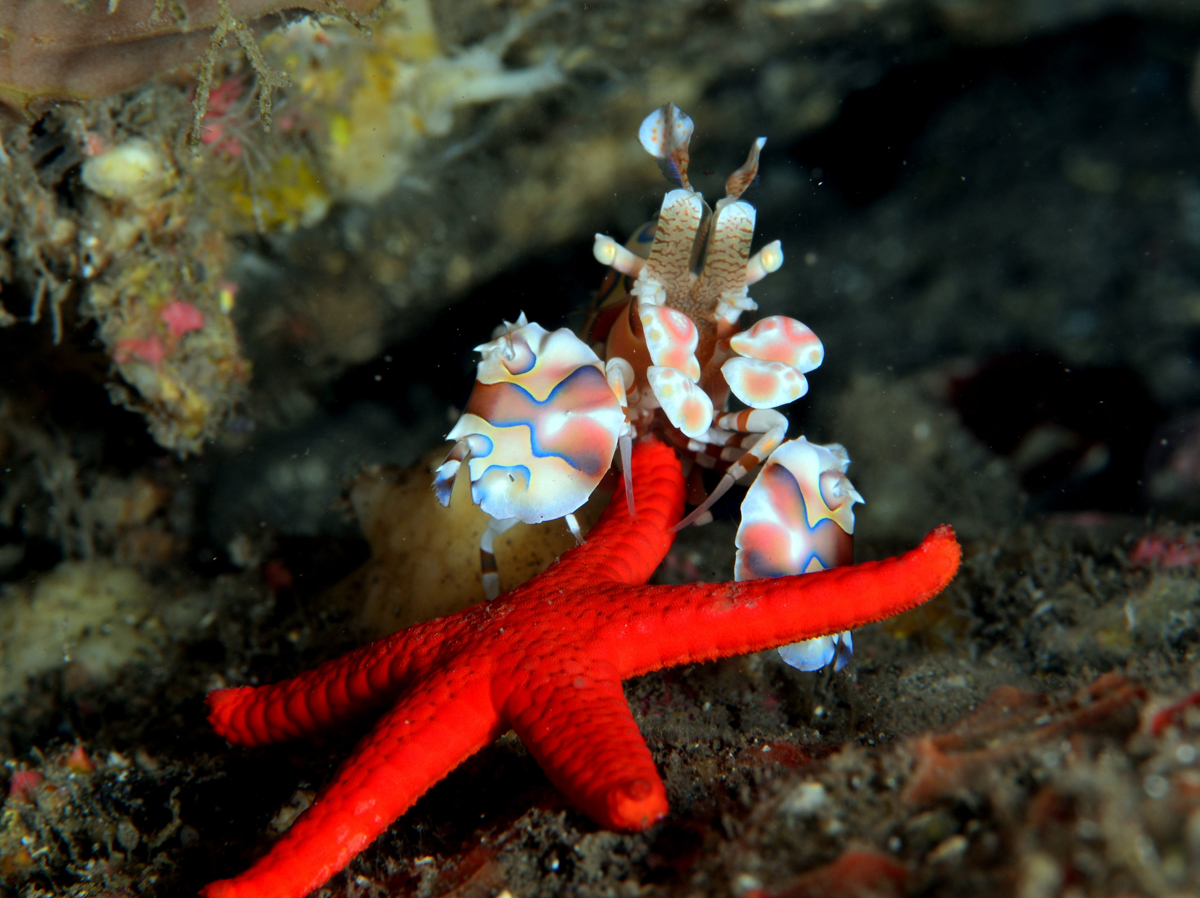
- Harlequin shrimp hunting a Fromia milleporella

Scientific classification
- Kingdom: Animalia
- Phylum: Arthropoda
- Class: Malacostraca
- Order: Decapoda
- Suborder: Pleocyemata
- Infraorder: Caridea
- Family: Palaemonidae
- Genus: Hymenocera; Latreille, 1819
- Species: H. picta

Binomial name
- Hymenocera picta Dana, 1852

Synonyms
- Hymenocera elegans Heller, 1861

= Hymenocera =

Hymenocera picta

Genus of crustaceans

Hymenocera picta, commonly known as the harlequin shrimp, is a species of saltwater shrimp found at coral reefs in the tropical Indian and Pacific Oceans. It is usually considered the only species in the genus Hymenocera, but some split it into two species: H. picta from the central and east Pacific, where the spots are deep pinkish-purple with a yellow edge, and H. elegans from the Indian Ocean and west Pacific, where the spots are more brownish and have a blue edge. They reach about 5 cm (2.0 in) in length, live in pairs, and feed exclusively on starfish, including crown-of-thorns starfish. They do seem to prefer smaller, more sedentary starfish, but as these generally are not sufficiently numerous for their needs, they commonly attack crown-of-thorns starfish, both reducing its consumption of coral while under attack, and killing it within a few days.

== Description ==
The harlequin shrimp is usually cream colored or white with occasional spots. Around the Pacific Ocean, many of these shrimp have red spots, while the Indian Ocean shrimp typically have purple spots; the Hawaiian H. picta has purple and red spots on its body, the shrimp has two walking legs on each side and large claws, or chelipoda. The claws and eyes appear to look flattened and thin. On its head, the shrimp has "petal-like sensory antennules" to smell out prey. Its body usually reaches up to 5 cm (2 in), and the male is slightly smaller than the female.

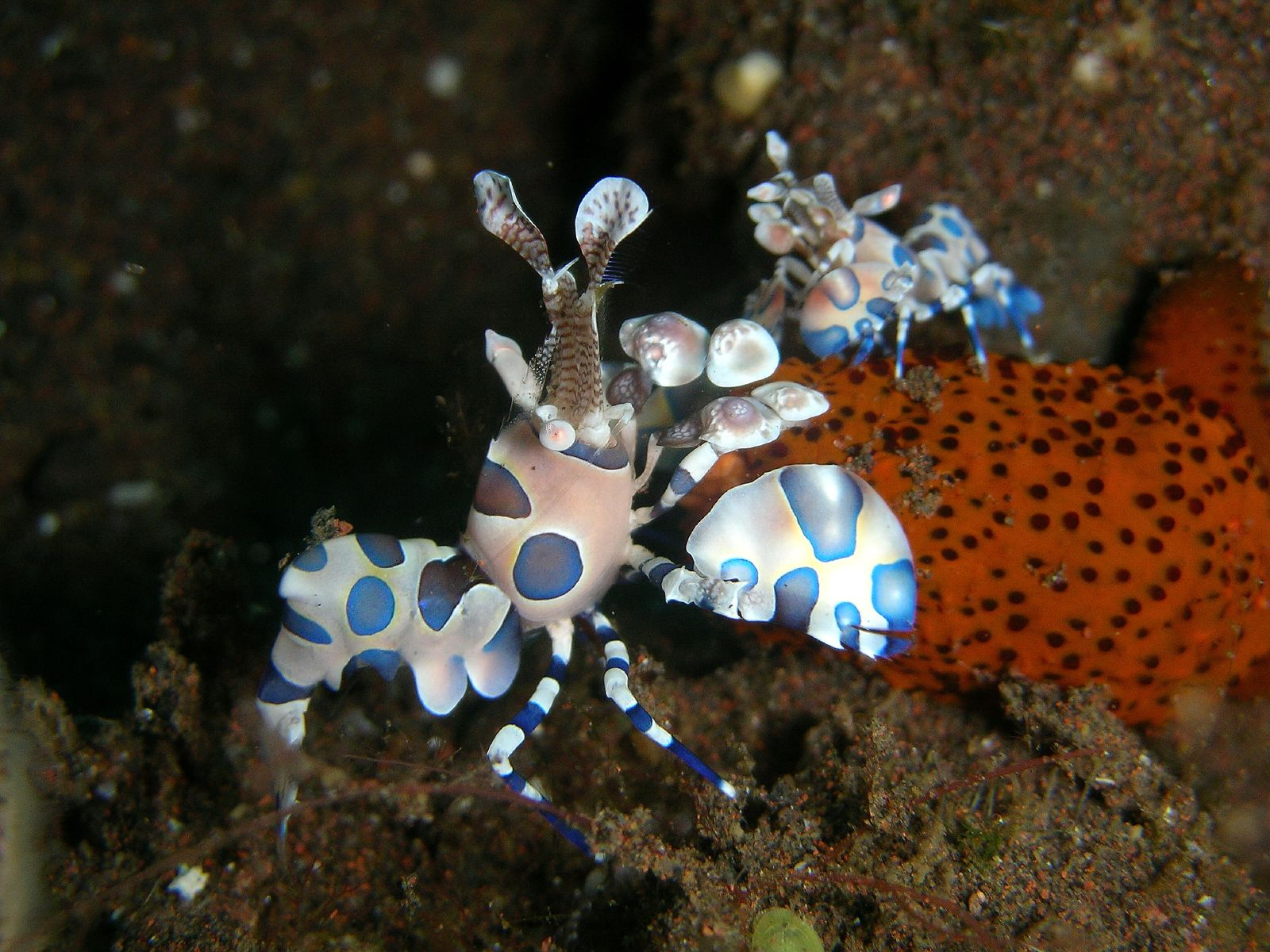
Couple of Hymenocera picta hunting a sea star

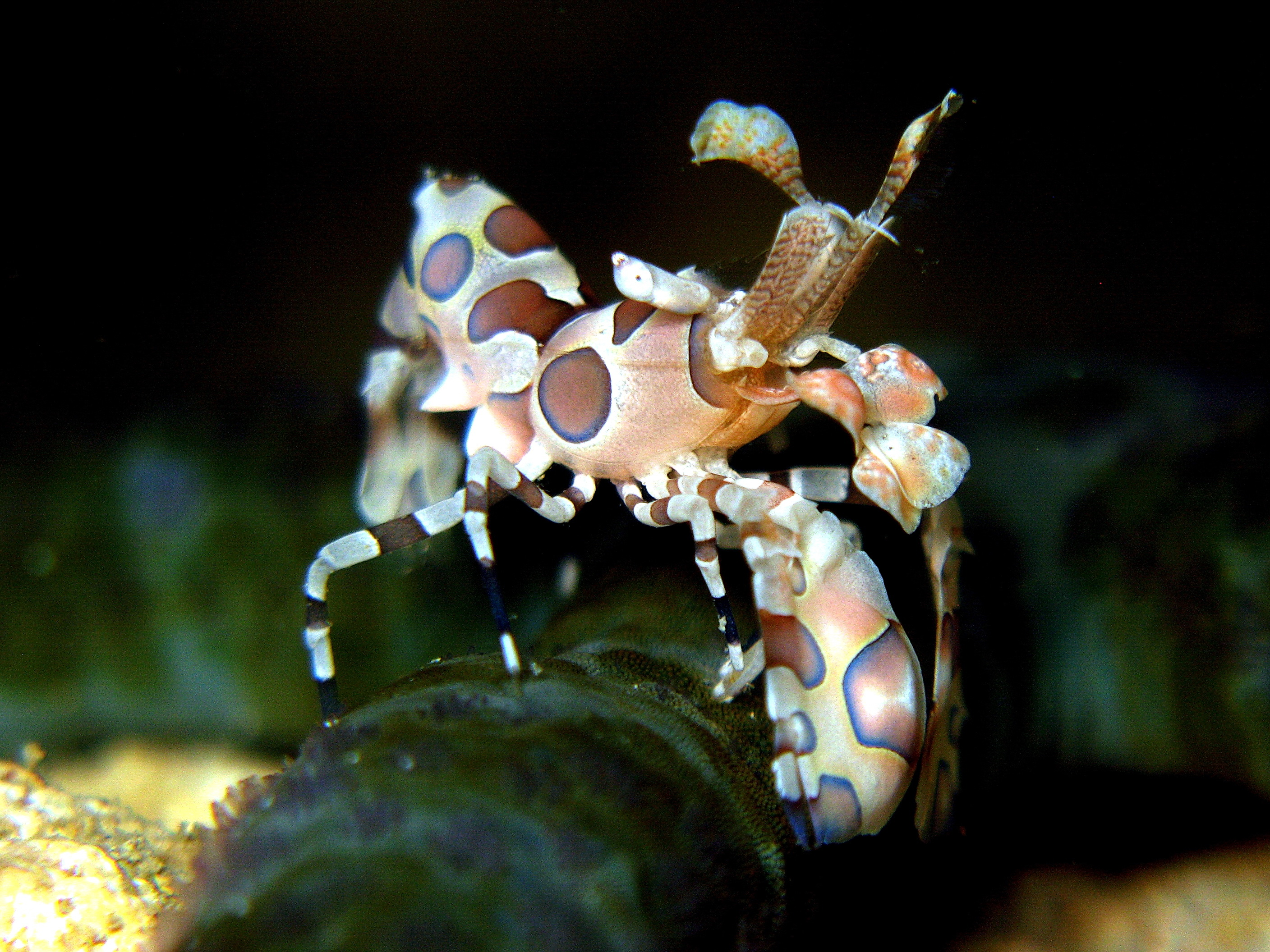
Harlequin shrimp of Indian Ocean/West Pacific population

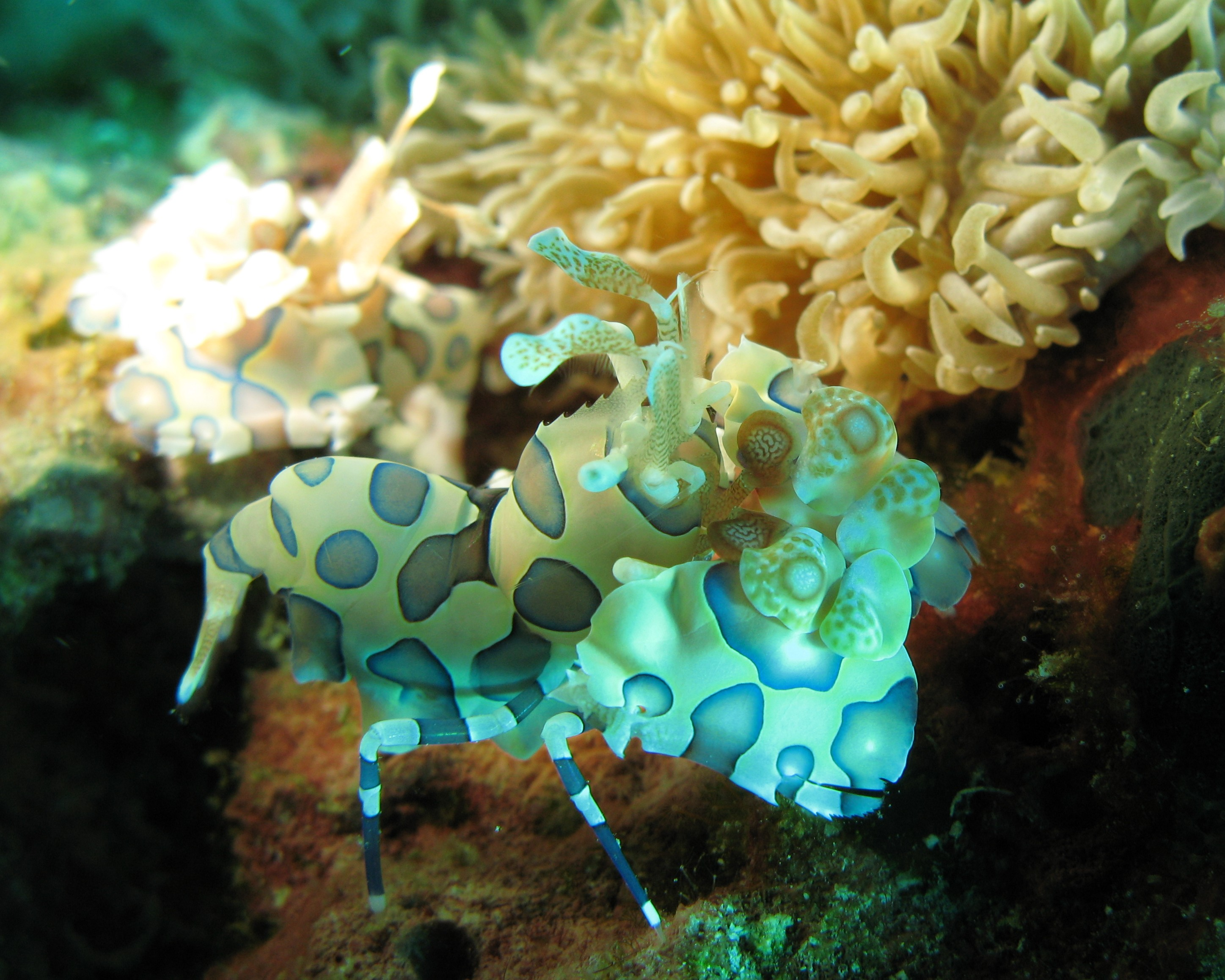

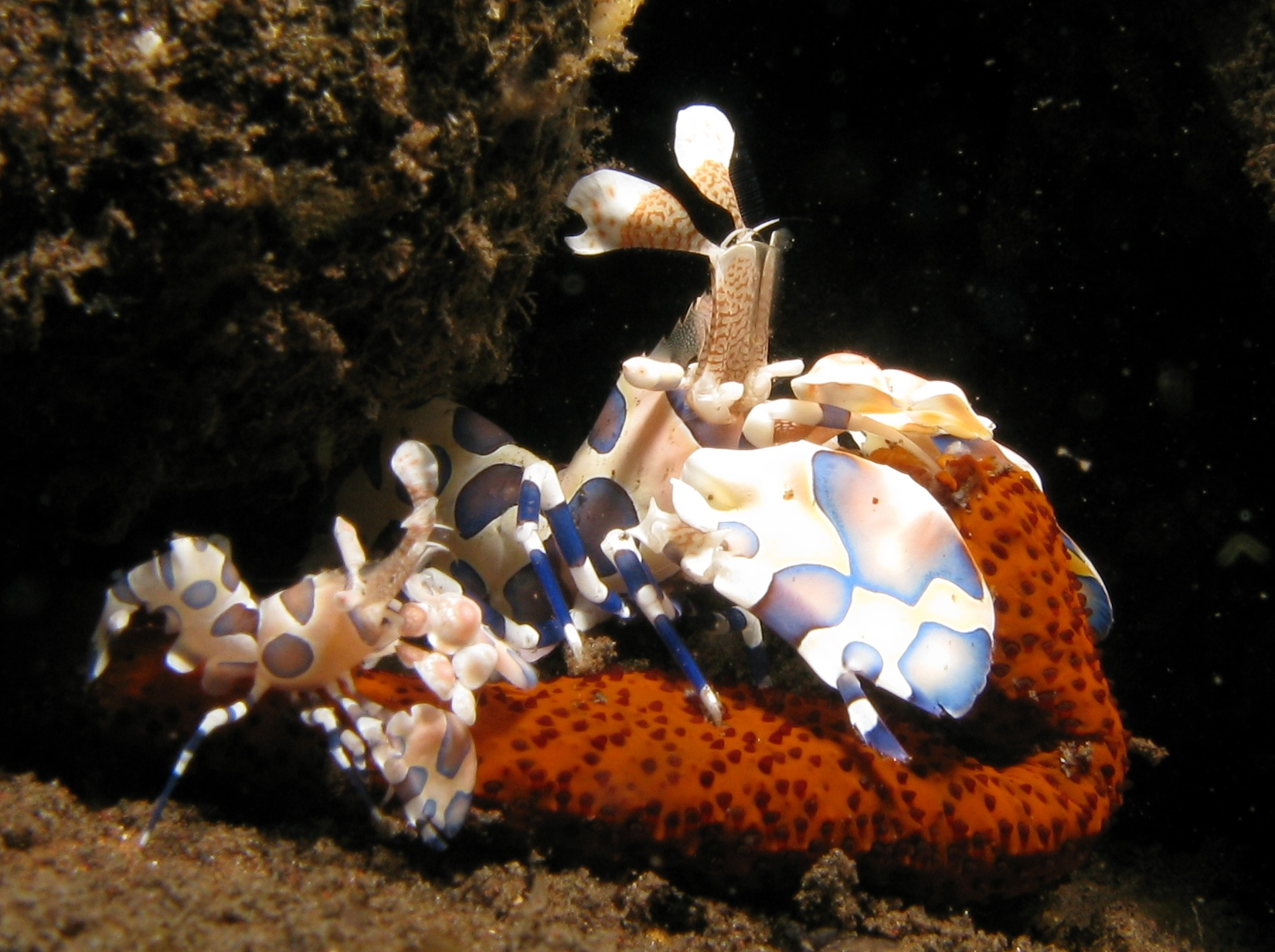

== Habitat ==
These shrimp are typically found in Hawaii through the Indo-Pacific below the intertidal zone on coral reefs. They prefer temperatures of 72–82°F, but are very rare because of the changing coral reefs.

== Diet ==
Harlequin shrimp usually only feed on starfish. They are very skilled at flipping over a slow starfish on its back, and eating the tube feet and soft tissues until it reaches the central disk. They, usually one female and one male, use their claws to pierce the tough skin and feeding legs to help them maneuver the starfish. Sometimes, the starfish will shed the arm that the shrimp attacked and regrow it, but it is usually too wounded to regrow. They may also feed on sea urchins, because they have tube feet, as well, but that is rare and only if starfish are not available.

== Behavior/reproduction ==
The harlequin shrimp moves at a very slow pace and in waves. It also may have toxins from its prey (the starfish), which could make it distasteful and potentially dangerous for predators. The shrimp also moves its claws almost constantly. Females are larger and have colored abdominal plates unlike the males. The female produces between 100 and 5,000 eggs per season depending on environmental factors. The male and female are often seen together in the wild, and work together to not only reproduce, but also to forage.
