= Nematopalaemon =

Scientific classification
- Domain: Eukaryota
- Kingdom: Animalia
- Phylum: Arthropoda
- Class: Malacostraca
- Order: Decapoda
- Suborder: Pleocyemata
- Infraorder: Caridea
- Family: Palaemonidae
- Genus: Nematopalaemon; Holthuis, 1950

Genus of shrimps

Nematopalaemon is a genus of shrimps belonging to the family Palaemonidae.

The species of this genus are found in Southern Asia, Africa and Southern America.

Species:

- Nematopalaemon colombiensis (Squires & Mora L., 1971)
- Nematopalaemon hastatus (Aurivillius, 1898)
- Nematopalaemon karnafuliensis (Ali Azam Khan, Fincham & Mahmood, 1980)
- Nematopalaemon schmitti (Holthuis, 1950)
- Nematopalaemon tenuipes (Henderson, 1893)
