= Cryphiops =

Scientific classification
- Domain: Eukaryota
- Kingdom: Animalia
- Phylum: Arthropoda
- Class: Malacostraca
- Order: Decapoda
- Suborder: Pleocyemata
- Infraorder: Caridea
- Family: Palaemonidae
- Genus: Cryphiops; Dana, 1852

Genus of shrimps

Cryphiops is a genus of shrimp belonging to the family Palaemonidae.

The species of this genus are found in Southeastern Asia and Southern America.

Species:

- Cryphiops brasiliensis (Gomes Corrêa, 1973)
- Cryphiops caementarius (Molina, 1782)
- Cryphiops luscus (Holthuis, 1973)
- Cryphiops perspicax (Holthuis, 1977)
- Cryphiops sbordonii Baldari, Mejía-Ortiz & López-Mejía, 2010
- Cryphiops villalobosi Villalobos Hiriart, Nates Rodriguez & Cantú Diaz Barriga, 1989
