= Creaseria =

Scientific classification
- Domain: Eukaryota
- Kingdom: Animalia
- Phylum: Arthropoda
- Class: Malacostraca
- Order: Decapoda
- Suborder: Pleocyemata
- Infraorder: Caridea
- Family: Palaemonidae
- Genus: Creaseria; Holthuis, 1950

Genus of shrimps

Creaseria is a genus of shrimps belonging to the family Palaemonidae.

The species of this genus are found in Central America.

Species:

- Creaseria morleyi (Creaser, 1936)
