= Leptocarpus (crustacean) =

Scientific classification
- Domain: Eukaryota
- Kingdom: Animalia
- Phylum: Arthropoda
- Class: Malacostraca
- Order: Decapoda
- Suborder: Pleocyemata
- Infraorder: Caridea
- Family: Palaemonidae
- Genus: Leptocarpus; Holthuis, 1950

Genus of arthropoda

Leptocarpus is a genus of shrimp belonging to the family Palaemonidae.

The species of this genus are found in Southeastern Asia.

Species:

- Leptocarpus fluminicola (Kemp, 1917)
- Leptocarpus kempi (Jayachandran, 1992)
- Leptocarpus potamiscus (Kemp, 1917)
