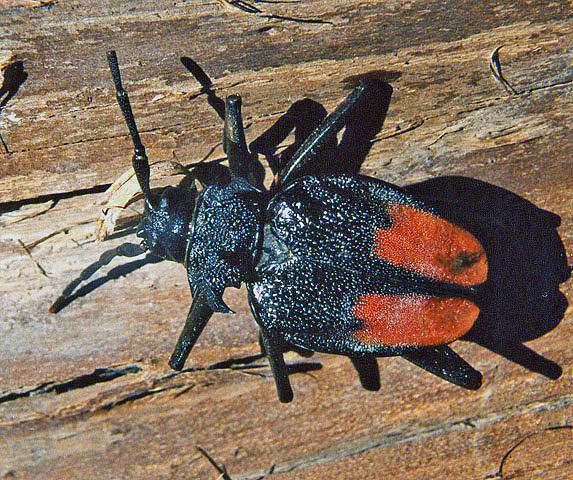

Scientific classification
- Kingdom: Animalia
- Phylum: Arthropoda
- Clade: Pancrustacea
- Class: Insecta
- Order: Coleoptera
- Suborder: Polyphaga
- Infraorder: Cucujiformia
- Family: Cerambycidae
- Subfamily: Prioninae
- Tribe: Prionini
- Genus: Apterocaulus; Fairmaire 1864
- Species: A. heterogama

Binomial name
- Apterocaulus heterogama Burmeister, 1861

Synonyms
- (Genus): Micropsalis Burmeister 1865; (Species): Apterocaulus germainei Fairmaire 1864

= Apterocaulus =

Apterocaulus heterogama

Genus of beetles

Apterocaulus is a genus of beetles in the family Cerambycidae. It is monotypic, being represented by the single species Apterocaulus heterogama.
