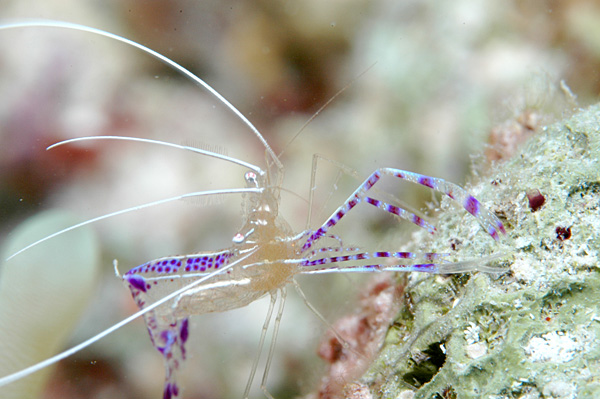
- Periclimenes pedersoni, a cleaner shrimp

Scientific classification
- Kingdom: Animalia
- Phylum: Arthropoda
- Clade: Pancrustacea
- Class: Malacostraca
- Order: Decapoda
- Suborder: Pleocyemata
- Infraorder: Caridea
- Superfamily: Palaemonoidea
- Family: Palaemonidae; Rafinesque, 1815

Synonyms
- Anchistioididae Borradaile, 1915; Kakaducarididae

= Palaemonidae =

Family of shrimp

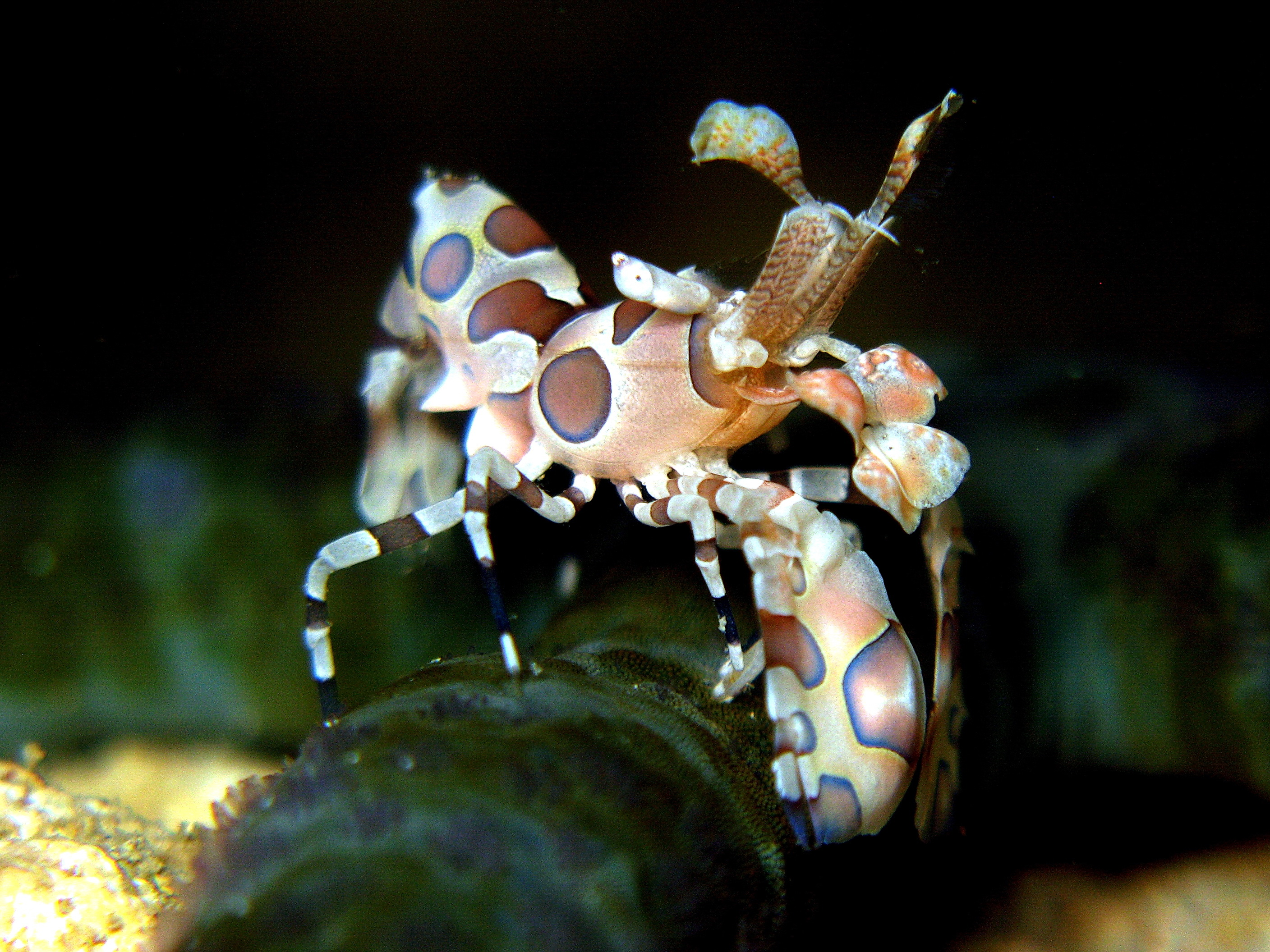
Harlequin shrimp, Hymenocera picta

Palaemonidae is a family of shrimp in the order Decapoda. Many species are carnivores that eat small invertebrates, and can be found in any aquatic habitat except the deep sea. One significant genus is Macrobrachium, which contains commercially fished species. Others inhabit coral reefs, where they associate with certain invertebrates, such as sponges, cnidarians, mollusks, and echinoderms, as cleaner shrimps, parasites, or commensals. They generally feed on detritus, though some are carnivores and hunt tiny animals.

The family contains more than 1200 species in 160 genera. The genera were formerly split into two subfamilies, but in 2015, molecular and morphological research determined that the subfamily groupings were invalid. At the same time, the members of the families Gnathophyllidae and Hymenoceridae were incorporated into the Palaemonidae.

== Genera ==
The following genera are recognised:

- Actinimenes Ďuriš & Horká, 2017
- Alburnia Bravi & Garassino, 1998 †
- Allopontonia Bruce, 1972
- Altopontonia Bruce, 1990
- Amphipontonia Bruce, 1991
- Anapontonia Bruce, 1966
- Anchiopontonia Bruce, 1992
- Anchistioides Paulson, 1875
- Anchistus Borradaile, 1898
- Ancylocaris Schenkel, 1902
- Ancylomenes Okuno & Bruce, 2010
- Anisomenaeus Bruce, 2010
- Apopontonia Bruce, 1976
- Arachnochium Wowor & Ng, 2010
- Araiopontonia Fujino & Miyake, 1970
- Ascidonia Fransen, 2002
- Bahiacaris Schweitzer, Santana, Pinheiro & Feldmann, 2019 †
- Balssia Kemp, 1922
- Bathymenes Kou, Li & Bruce, 2016
- Bavaricaris Winkler, 2021 †
- Bechleja Houša, 1957 †
- Beurlenia Martins-Neto & Mezzalira, 1991 †
- Blepharocaris Mitsuhashi & Chan, 2007
- Brachycarpus Spence Bate, 1888
- Brucecaris Marin & Chan, 2006
- Bruceonia Fransen, 2002
- Cainonia Bruce, 2005
- Calathaemon Bruce & Short, 1993
- Carinopontonia Bruce, 1988
- Chacella Bruce, 1986
- Climeniperaeus Bruce, 1995
- Colemonia Bruce, 2005
- Conchodytes Peters, 1852
- Coralliocaris Stimpson, 1860
- Coutierea Nobili, 1901
- Creaseria Holthuis, 1950
- Crinotonia Marin, 2006
- Cristimenes Ďuriš & Horká, 2017
- Cryphiops Dana, 1852
- Ctenopontonia Bruce, 1979
- Cuapetes Clark, 1919
- Dactylonia Fransen, 2002
- Dasella Lebour, 1945
- Dasycaris Kemp, 1922
- Diapontonia Bruce, 1986
- Echinopericlimenes Marin & Chan, 2014
- Epipontonia Bruce, 1977
- Eupontonia Bruce, 1971
- Exoclimenella Bruce, 1995
- Exopontonia Bruce, 1988
- Fennera Holthuis, 1951
- Gnathophylleptum d'Udekem d'Acoz, 2001
- Gnathophylloides Schmitt, 1933
- Gnathophyllum Latreille, 1819
- Hamiger Borradaile, 1916
- Hamodactyloides Fujino, 1973
- Hamodactylus Holthuis, 1952
- Hamopontonia Bruce, 1970
- Harpiliopsis Borradaile, 1917
- Harpilius Dana, 1852
- Holthuisaeus Anker & De Grave, 2010
- Homelys Meyer, 1862 †
- Hymenocera Latreille, 1819
- Ischnopontonia Bruce, 1966
- Isopontonia Bruce, 1982
- Izucaris Okuno, 1999
- Jocaste Holthuis, 1952
- Kaviengella Šobáňová & Ďuriš, 2018
- Kellnerius Santana, Pinheiro, Da Silva & Saraiva, 2013 †
- Laomenes Clark, 1919
- Leander Desmarest, 1849
- Leandrites Holthuis, 1950
- Leptocarpus Holthuis, 1950
- Leptomenaeus Bruce, 2007
- Leptopalaemon Bruce & Short, 1993
- Levicaris Bruce, 1973
- Lipkebe Chace, 1969
- Lipkemenes Bruce & Okuno, 2010
- Macrobrachium Spence Bate, 1868
- Madangella Frolová & Ďuriš, 2018
- Manipontonia Bruce, Okuno & Li, 2005
- Margitonia Bruce, 2007
- Mesopontonia Bruce, 1967
- Metapontonia Bruce, 1967
- Michaelimenes Okuno, 2017
- Micropsalis Meyer, 1859 †
- Miopontonia Bruce, 1985
- Nematopalaemon Holthuis, 1950
- Neoanchistus Bruce, 1975
- Neoclimenes Mitsuhashi, Li & Chan, 2010
- Neopalaemon Hobbs, 1973
- Neopericlimenes Heard, Spotte & Bubucis, 1993
- Neopontonides Holthuis, 1951
- Nippontonia Bruce & Bauer, 1997
- Notopontonia Bruce, 1991
- Odontonia Fransen, 2002
- Onycocaridella Bruce, 1981
- Onycocaridites Bruce, 1987
- Onycocaris Nobili, 1904
- Onycomenes Bruce, 2009
- Opaepupu Anker & De Grave, 2021
- Orthopontonia Bruce, 1982
- Palaemon Weber, 1795
- Palaemonella Dana, 1852
- Paraclimenaeus Bruce, 1988
- Paraclimenes Bruce, 1995
- Paranchistus Holthuis, 1952
- Parapalaemonetes Brandt & Schulz, 2013 †
- Paratypton Balss, 1914
- Patonia Mitsuhashi & Chan, 2006
- Periclimenaeus Borradaile, 1915
- Periclimenella Bruce, 1995
- Periclimenes O.G. Costa, 1844
- Periclimenoides Bruce, 1990
- Philarius Holthuis, 1952
- Phycomenes Bruce, 2008
- Phyllognathia Borradaile, 1915
- Pinnotherotonia Marin & Paulay, 2010
- Platycaris Holthuis, 1952
- Platypontonia Bruce, 1968
- Plesiomenaeus Bruce, 2009
- Plesiopontonia Bruce, 1985
- Pliopontonia Bruce, 1973
- Pontonia Latreille, 1829
- Pontonides Borradaile, 1917
- Pontoniopsides Bruce, 2005
- Pontoniopsis Borradaile, 1915
- Poripontonia Fransen, 2003
- Propalaemon Woodward, 1903 †
- Propontonia Bruce, 1969
- Pseudocaridinella Martins-Neto & Mezzalira, 1991 †
- Pseudoclimenes Bruce, 2008
- Pseudocoutierea Holthuis, 1951
- Pseudopalaemon Sollaud, 1911
- Pseudopontonia Bruce, 1992
- Pseudopontonides Heard, 1986
- Pseudoveleronia Marin, 2008
- Pycnocaris Bruce, 1972
- Rapimenes Ďuriš & Horká, 2017
- Rapipontonia Marin, 2007
- Rhopalaemon Ashelby & De Grave, 2010
- Rostronia Fransen, 2002
- Sandimenes Li, 2009
- Sandyella Marin, 2009
- Schmelingia Schweigert, 2002 †
- Stegopontonia Nobili, 1906
- Tectopontonia Bruce, 1973
- Tenuipedium Wowor & Ng, 2010
- Thaumastocaris Kemp, 1922
- Troglindicus Sankolli & Shenoy, 1979
- Troglocubanus Holthuis, 1949
- Troglomexicanus Villalobos, Alvarez & Iliffe, 1999
- Tuleariocaris Hipeau-Jacquotte, 1965
- Typton Costa, 1844
- Typtonoides Bruce, 2010
- Typtonomenaeus Marin & Chan, 2013
- Typtonychus Bruce, 1996
- Unesconia Anker, 2020
- Unguicaris Marin & Chan, 2006
- Urocaridella Borradaile, 1915
- Urocaris Stimpson, 1860
- Veleronia Holthuis, 1951
- Veleroniopsis Gore, 1981
- Vir Holthuis, 1952
- Waldola Holthuis, 1951
- Yemenicaris Bruce, 1997
- Yongjicaris Garassino, Yanbin, Schram & Taylor, 2002 †
- Zenopontonia Bruce, 1975
- Zoukaris Anker & Corbari, 2020

Some of the genera were formerly placed in the family Gnathophyllidae, which is no longer recognized. These shrimp were often associated with echinoderms, and consisted of about 14 species in five genera:

- Gnathophylleptum d'Udekem d'Acoz, 2001
- Gnathophylloides Schmitt, 1933
- Gnathophyllum Latreille, 1819
- Levicaris Bruce, 1973
- Pycnocaris Bruce, 1972

== Gallery ==
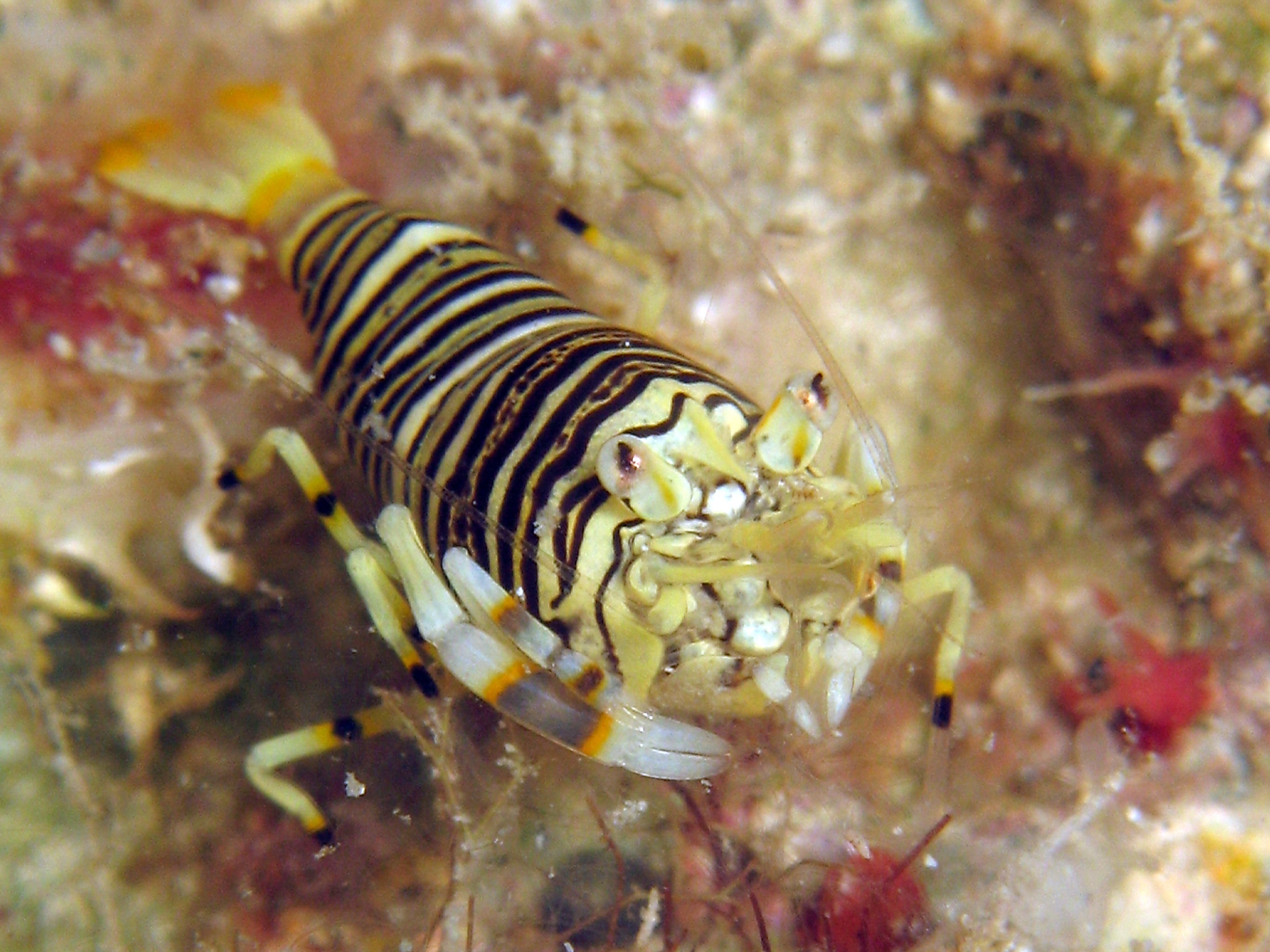
Gnathophyllum americanum

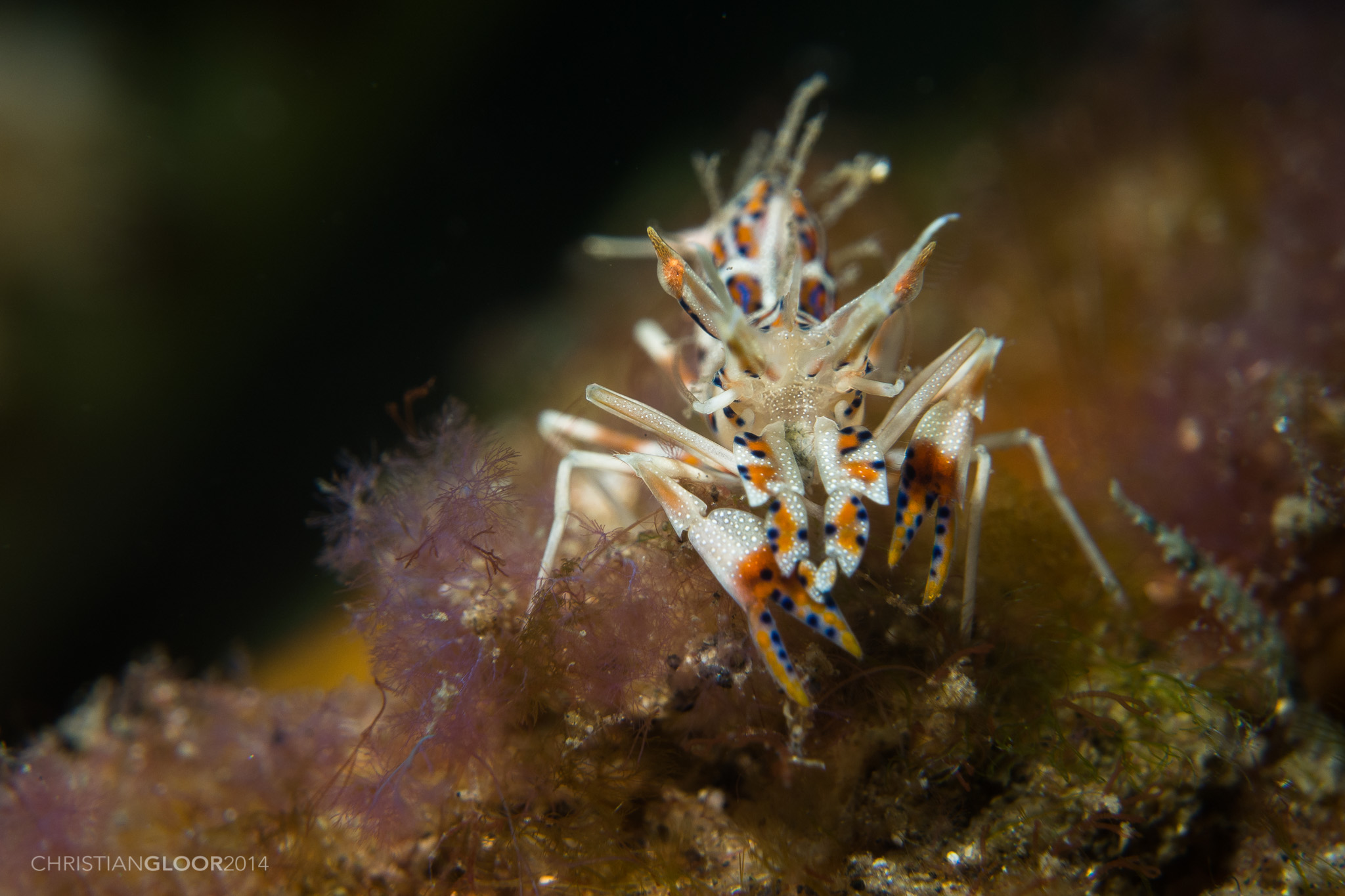
Phyllognathia ceratophthalma, Phyllognathia genus
