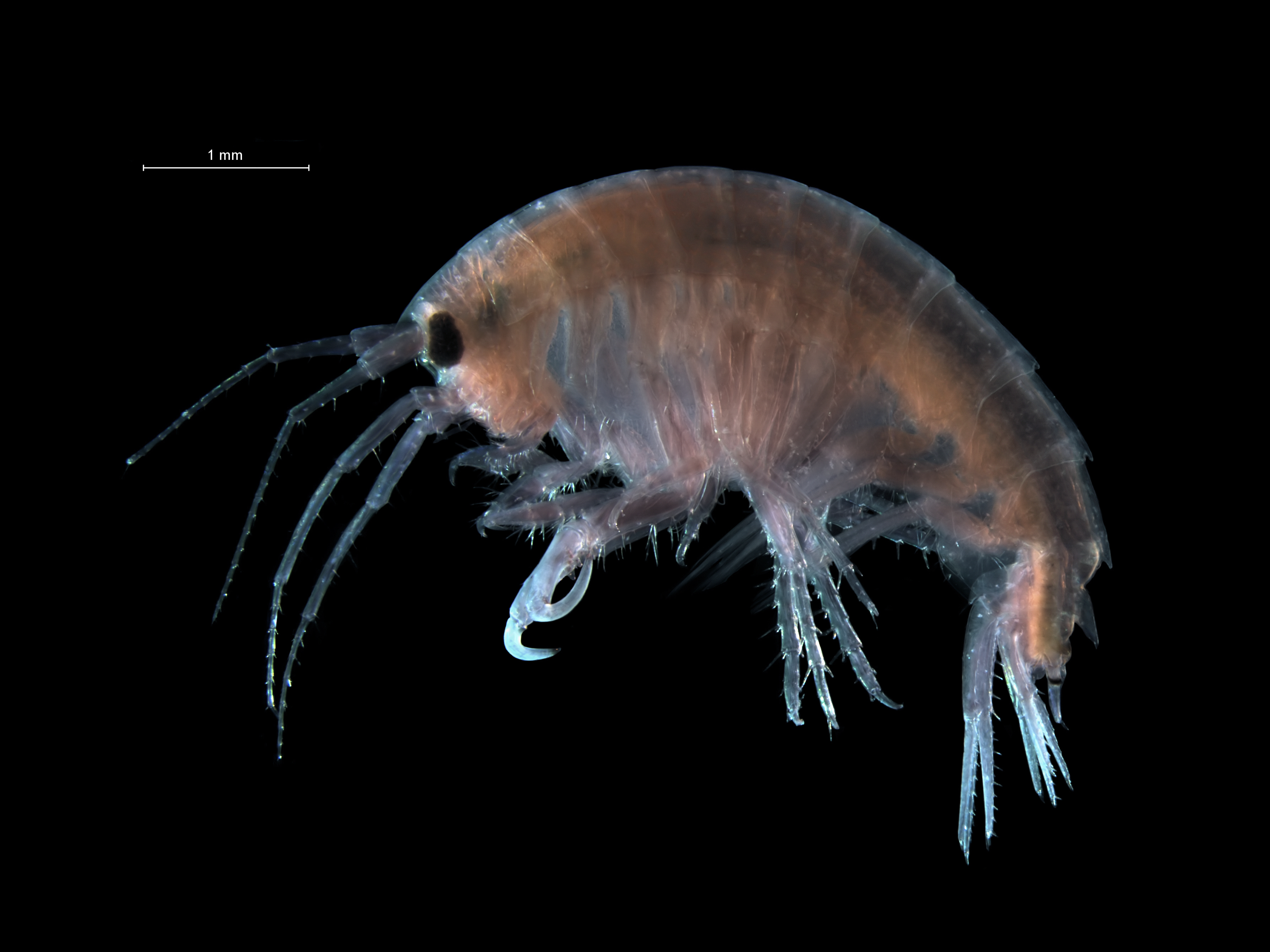
- Nototropis falcatus

Scientific classification
- Domain: Eukaryota
- Kingdom: Animalia
- Phylum: Arthropoda
- Class: Malacostraca
- Order: Amphipoda
- Family: Atylidae
- Genus: Nototropis; Costa, 1853

Species
- See text

= Nototropis =

Genus of crustaceans

Nototropis is a genus of amphipod crustaceans, in the family, Atylidae, and was first described by Achille Costa in 1853.

== Species ==
The genus contains the following species:

- Nototropis brevitarsus Ledoyer, 1979
- Nototropis comes Giles, 1888
- Nototropis dentatus Schellenberg, 1931
- Nototropis falcatus (Metzer, 1871)
- Nototropis granulosus Walker, 1904
- Nototropis guttatus Costa, 1853
- Nototropis homochir (Haswell, 1885)
- Nototropis massiliensis Bellan-Santini, 1975
- Nototropis megalops Moore, 1984
- Nototropis melanops Oldevig, 1959
- Nototropis minikoi (A. O. Walker, 1905)
- Nototropis nordlandicus Boeck, 1871
- Nototropis reductus K. H. Barnard, 1930
- Nototropis serratus Schellenberg, 1925
- Nototropis smitti Goës, 1866
- Nototropis swammerdamei (Milne-Edwards, 1830)
- Nototropis taupo J. L. Barnard, 1972
- Nototropis tulearensis (Ledoyer, 1982)
- Nototropis urocarinatus McKinney, 1980
- Nototropis vedlomensis Bate & Westwood, 1863
