= Exosphaeroma amplicauda =

Scientific classification
- Kingdom: Animalia
- Phylum: Arthropoda
- Clade: Pancrustacea
- Class: Malacostraca
- Order: Isopoda
- Family: Sphaeromatidae
- Genus: Exosphaeroma
- Species: E. amplicauda

Binomial name
- Exosphaeroma amplicauda (Stimpson, 1857)

Synonyms
- Sphaeroma octonctum Richardson, 1899

Species of crustacean

Exosphaeroma amplicauda is a species of marine isopod of the family Sphaeromatidae.

== Description ==
Exosphaeroma amplicauda has a chitinous exoskeleton, with overlapping, articulated dorsal plates, common to members of the order isopoda. This species exhibits strong sexual dimorphism. Females lack the dorsal tubercles present on the pereonites of the males. Males also have a larger pleotelson and uropods. The largest male measured 8.4 mm, the largest female 7.5 mm.

Exosphaeroma amplicauda is morphologically similar to E. russellhansoni. It can be distinguished by the lack of tubercles on the pereonites of the latter, as well as differences in the structure of the appendix masculina.

== Distribution and habitat ==
This species has been found in Marin, Sonoma, and San Mateo Counties, California. It inhabits the intertidal zone where it clings to the underside of rocks.

== Taxonomy ==
Exosphaeroma amplicauda was first described by William Stimpson in 1857. Stimpson's type specimens for the species are likely lost. In addition, his descriptions do not allow for a definitive identification, as five morphologically similar species exist in the same region. As a result, in 2015 a neotype was designated to stabilize the taxon, as well as to preserve the original species concept.

In the same paper, the type specimens for Sphaeroma octonctum Richardson, 1899 were examined. They were found to be indistinguishable from female E. amplicauda and were subsequently placed into junior synonymy with that species.
