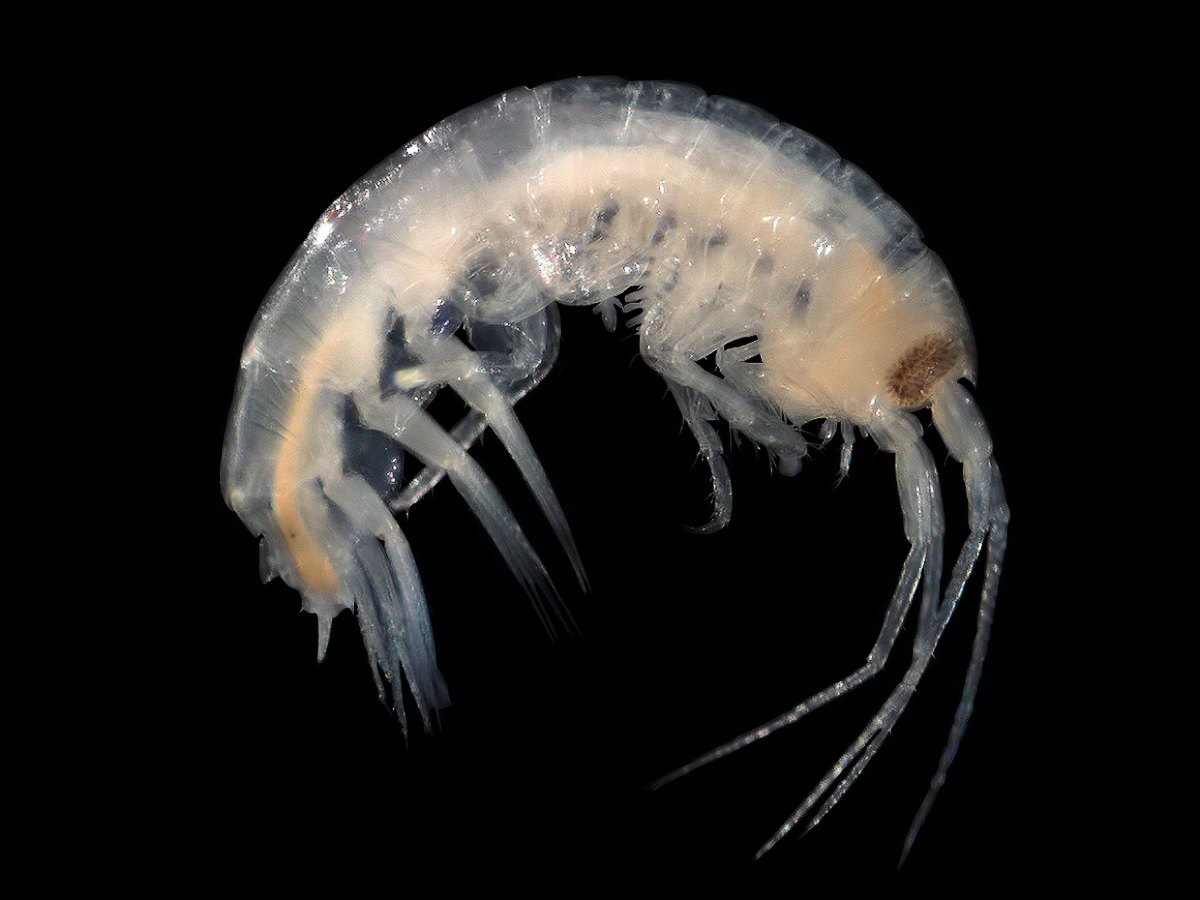
- N. swammerdamei from the Belgian continental shelf

Scientific classification
- Domain: Eukaryota
- Kingdom: Animalia
- Phylum: Arthropoda
- Class: Malacostraca
- Order: Amphipoda
- Family: Atylidae
- Genus: Nototropis
- Species: N. swammerdamei

Binomial name
- Nototropis swammerdamei (Milne-Edwards, 1830)

Synonyms
- Ampithoe swammerdamei (H. Milne Edwards, 1830); Atylus compressa (Liljeborg, 1852); Atylus gordoniana (Spence Bate, 1857); Atylus loughrini (Spence Bate, 1862); Atylus swammerdamei (H. Milne Edwards, 1830)

= Nototropis swammerdamei =

Species of crustacean

Nototropis swammerdamei is an amphipod crustacean of the family Atylidae.

== Description ==
N. swammerdamei is about 8 millimetres (0.31 in) long, translucent white with some brown areas. Its first two segments are smooth, and the third sometimes has a tooth on the back. Its first pair of legs is small, the second pair is larger, then the next legs are separated by a gap. The third and fourth pairs of legs are small, and the fifth, sixth, and seventh are long.

== Distribution ==
It can be found along the shore and sublittoral zones near sand and algae throughout Europe, from the Arctic Circle by Norway to the Mediterranean Sea.

== Taxonomic history ==
The species was first described as Amphithoe swammerdamei in 1830 by Henri Milne-Edwards. It was named after Jan Swammerdam, a Dutch biologist.
