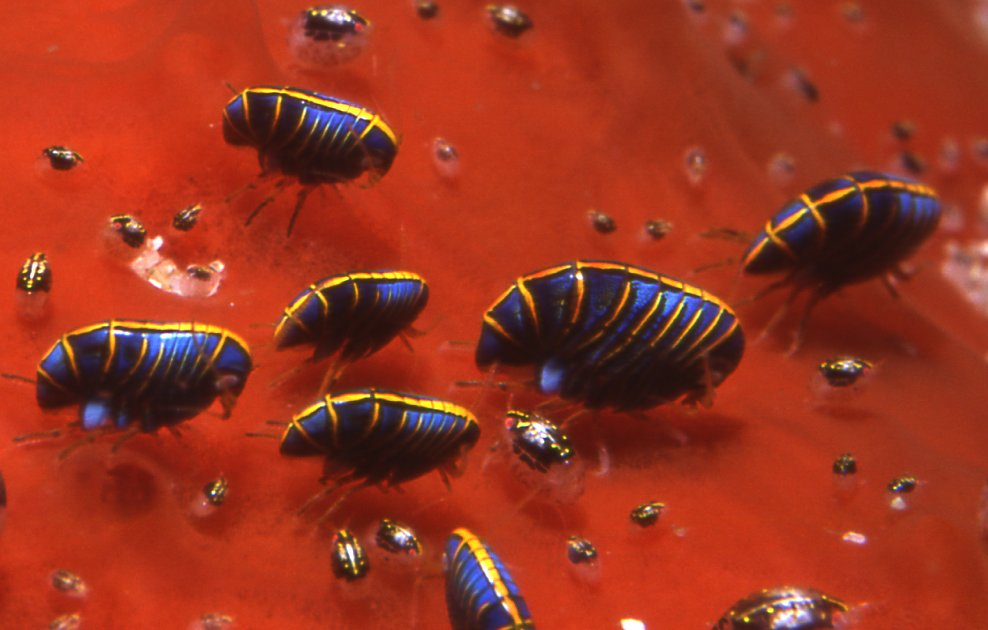

Scientific classification
- Kingdom: Animalia
- Phylum: Arthropoda
- Clade: Pancrustacea
- Class: Malacostraca
- Order: Amphipoda
- Family: Iphimediidae
- Genus: Iphimedia
- Species: I. gibba

Binomial name
- Iphimedia gibba (K. H. Barnard, 1955)

= Hunchback amphipod =

Species of crustacean

The hunchback amphipod, Iphimedia gibba, is a species of amphipod crustacean. It is a marine arthropod in the family Iphimediidae. It was first described in 1955 by Keppel Harcourt Barnard as Cypsiphimedia gibba.

== Distribution ==
This species is found off the South African coast from the Cape Peninsula to Port Elizabeth, from the subtidal down to at least 25 metres (82 ft).

== Description ==
The hunchback amphipod is a small but conspicuous amphipod, not reaching more than 5 millimetres (0.20 in) in size. It is vividly striped in blue and yellow. It has blue sideplates. The body is hunched so that the head faces downwards.
