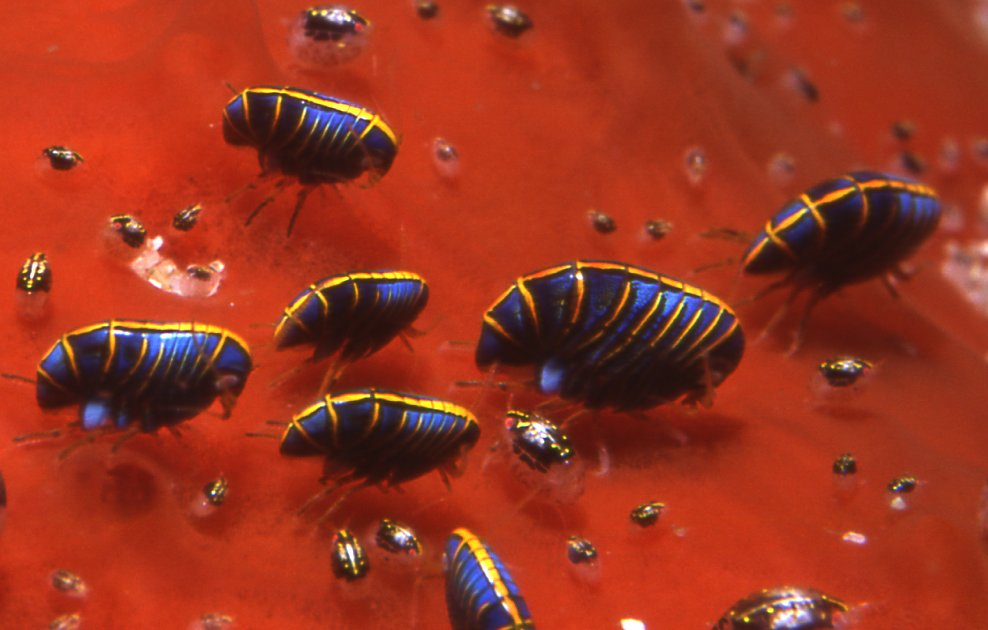
- Iphimedia gibba

Scientific classification
- Domain: Eukaryota
- Kingdom: Animalia
- Phylum: Arthropoda
- Class: Malacostraca
- Order: Amphipoda
- Family: Iphimediidae
- Genus: Iphimedia; Rathke, 1843

Species
- See text

= Iphimedia (crustacean) =

Genus of crustaceans

Iphimedia is a genus of amphipods which belongs to the family Iphimediidae in the arthropod group Amphipoda. It is the only genus of the family to have species which live in tropical waters. All other genera of the family are only found in cold or deep oceans.

== Species ==
Species in the genus Iphimedia include:

- Iphimedia capicola K. H. Barnard, 1932
- Iphimedia discreta Stebbing, 1910
- Iphimedia eblanae Bate, 1857
- Iphimedia gibba K. H. Barnard, 1940
- Iphimedia gladiolus K. H. Barnard 1937
- Iphimedia haurakiensis
- Iphimedia hedgpethi (J. L. Barnard, 1969)
- Iphimedia minuta G. O. Sars, 1882
- Iphimedia nexa Myers and McGrath, 1987
- Iphimedia obesa Rathke, 1843
- Iphimedia orchestimana Ruffo, 1959
- Iphimedia perplexa Myers and Costello, 1987
- Iphimedia rickettsi (Shoemaker, 1931)
- Iphimedia spatula Myers and McGrath, 1987
- Iphimedia warraina Thomas and Barnard, 1991
- Iphimedia xesta Thomas and Barnard, 1991
- Iphimedia zora Thomas and J. L. Barnard, 1991
