= Exosphaeroma pentcheffi =

Scientific classification
- Kingdom: Animalia
- Phylum: Arthropoda
- Clade: Pancrustacea
- Class: Malacostraca
- Order: Isopoda
- Family: Sphaeromatidae
- Genus: Exosphaeroma
- Species: E. pentcheffi

Binomial name
- Exosphaeroma pentcheffi Wall, Bruce & Wetzer, 2015

Species of crustacean

Exosphaeroma pentcheffi is a species of marine isopod of the family Sphaeromatidae.

== Description ==
This species lacks strong sexual dimorphism, with both sexes possessing prominent dorsal tubercles. The largest male specimen measured 6.8 mm, while the largest female measured 4.6 mm.

== Distribution and habitat ==
This species is known to inhabit the intertidal zone of the Palos Verdes Peninsula, Los Angeles, California.

== Taxonomy ==
Exosphaeroma pentcheffi is named for Natural History Museum of Los Angeles County researcher N. Dean Pentcheff. Pentcheff led the field trip for an invertebrate zoology lab course at Loyola Marymount University during which the species was discovered.
