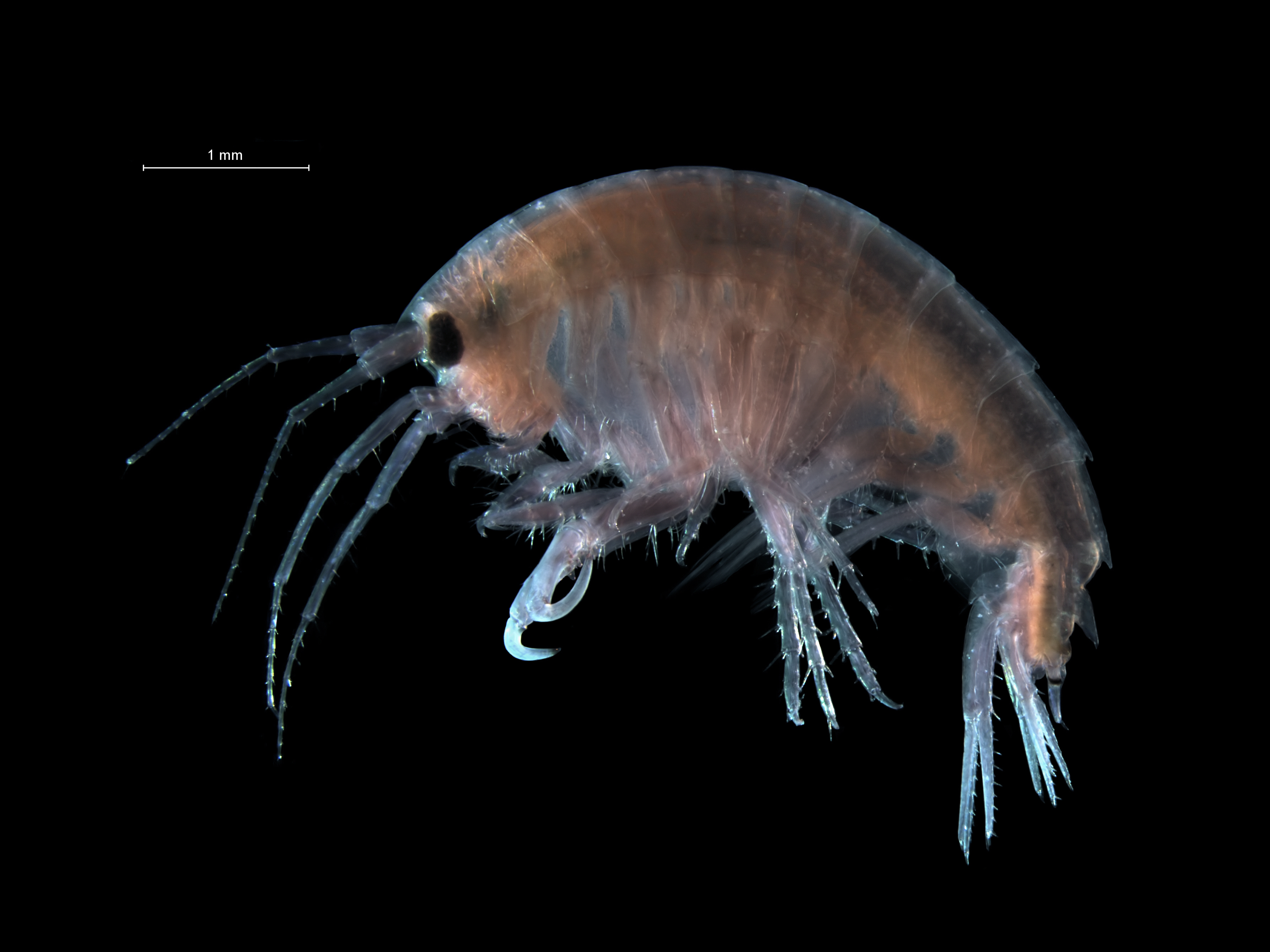

Scientific classification
- Domain: Eukaryota
- Kingdom: Animalia
- Phylum: Arthropoda
- Class: Malacostraca
- Order: Amphipoda
- Family: Atylidae
- Genus: Nototropis
- Species: N. falcatus

Binomial name
- Nototropis falcatus (Metzger, 1871)

Synonyms
- Atylus falcatus Metzger, 1871; Atylus uncinatus G. O. Sars, 1883; Paratylus unciatus Sars, 1883; Nototropis uncinatus O. Sars, 1883

= Nototropis falcatus =

Species of amphipod crustacean

Nototropis falcatus is a species of amphipod crustacean. It is whitish in colour, with brown patches, and grows to a total length of around 7 mm (0.3 in). It lives on soft sediment such as fine sand at depths of 10 to 50 metres (33 to 164 ft), from northern Norway to the west coast of Ireland, including the North Sea, and as far south as the southern Bay of Biscay.

== Description ==
Nototropis falcatus has a laterally flattened body and grows to a length of about 7 mm (0.3 in). It is whitish with patches of brown. The head has a small acute rostrum and wavy-edged lateral lobes. The compound eyes are large, especially so in the male. The first antenna of the female is about one third of the length of the body, and the second antenna is slightly longer than the first; the antennae of the male are longer than those of the female. The pereon or thoracic segments are short while the pleon or abdominal segments are long. The first three pleon segments are either smooth or have a small notch or tooth on the rear margin. The third pereiopod or thoracic leg is particularly stout and has a curved propodus (penultimate joint) and powerful dactylus (claw); the fourth pereiopod is smaller; in males, these two legs have long, plumose setae (bristles). The basal segments of the first three pleopods or abdominal legs are much enlarged. The abdomen ends in a short telson, cleft for three quarters of its length, which is flanked by uropods to form a tail fan.

== Ecology ==
This amphipod can swim using its abdominal legs and orienting itself on its side and can also burrow in the soft substrate. It probably feeds by grazing on plant material and consuming detritus.
