= Rhincalanus nasutus =

Scientific classification
- Domain: Eukaryota
- Kingdom: Animalia
- Phylum: Arthropoda
- Class: Copepoda
- Order: Calanoida
- Family: Rhincalanidae
- Genus: Rhincalanus
- Species: R. nasutus

Binomial name
- Rhincalanus nasutus Giesbrecht, 1888

Species of crustacean

Rhincalanus nasutus is a copepod in the family Rhincalanidae.

== Taxonomy and phylogeny ==
Rhincalanus nasutus is a species complex, composed of at least two cryptic species: one species consisting of, at the very least, individuals off of Peru, in the Sulu Sea, and in the California Current, in addition to another species composed of specimens from the Kuroshio Current, the southwest Pacific, and the northern Atlantic. In its genus, it is sister to R. gigas.

== Description ==
The female of R. nasutus ranges anywhere from about 2.8 to 6.1 millimetres (0.11 to 0.24 in) in length, and the male is generally between about 2.7 and 4.5 millimetres (0.11 and 0.18 in).

== Distribution ==
Rhincalanus nasutus is found in waters across the globe, primarily in the open ocean and continental shelf and slope waters.

== Ecology ==
=== Life cycle and reproduction ===
Rhincalanus nasutus is seasonal in terms of the timing of reproduction. Off of the waters of southern California, it generally reproduces from February to April, and it also can reproduce in late summer, as late as June. This reproduction is likely to be limited by food, as evidenced by this copepod failing to breed in the absence of food. Copepodite stages I through IV are usually found in the surface waters (from sea level to 200 metres (660 ft) in depth). The abundance of individuals in the surface, however, varies seasonally: they are most abundant during the spring, and are not present during summer and autumn. Stage V copepodites and adults are generally distributed below 200 metres (660 ft) in depth, and especially below 500 metres (1,600 ft). In seasonal waters, such as the Gulf of Aqaba, stage V copepodites go into diapause to moult into females. During this time, they also rapidly accumulate wax esters, possibly for future reproduction.
