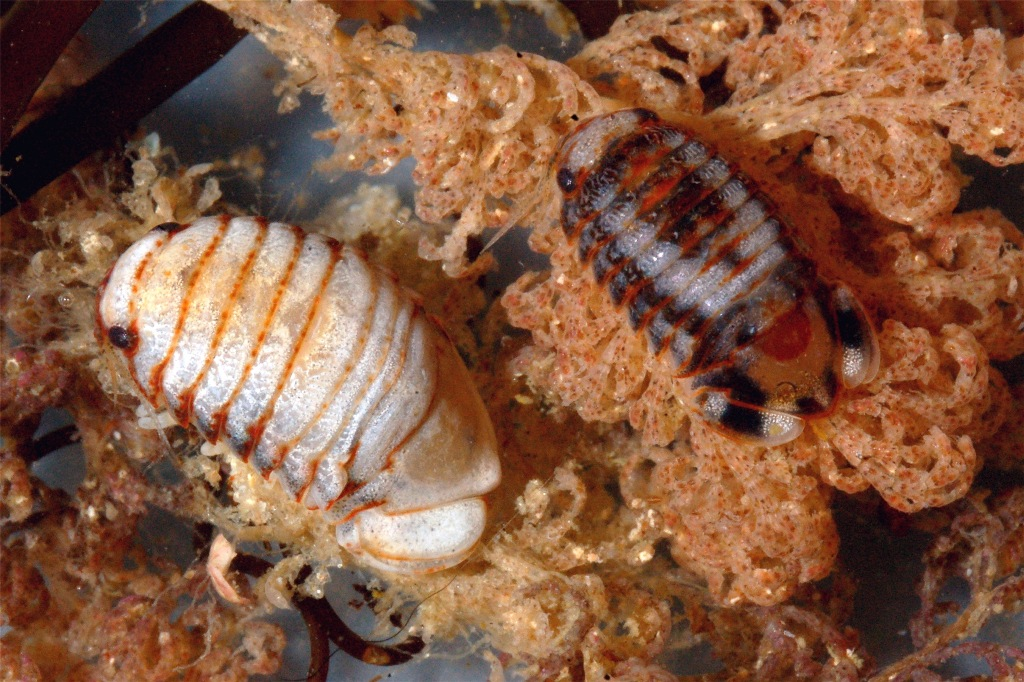

Scientific classification
- Kingdom: Animalia
- Phylum: Arthropoda
- Class: Malacostraca
- Order: Isopoda
- Family: Sphaeromatidae
- Genus: Exosphaeroma
- Species: E. laeviusculum

Binomial name
- Exosphaeroma laeviusculum (Heller, 1868)

Synonyms
- Sphaeroma laevisculum Heller, 1868

= Exosphaeroma laeviusculum =

Species of crustacean

Exosphaeroma laeviusculum is a species of isopod in the family Sphaeromatidae, native to the west coast of southern Africa.

== Description ==
Exosphaeroma laeviusculum has a flattened body with speckled pattern of black and white, or pink. The pleon consists of a single segment, although the original fused segments are still discernible by lateral grooves. The telson is triangular, bears two small ridges near the base and a semicircle of tiny tubercles. Average body length is 10 mm.

== Distribution and habitat ==
The species occurs on the west coast of southern Africa, from Lüderitz in Namibia to Cape Point in South Africa. It inhabits the intertidal zone or shallow water, where it may be found among weeds or under stones.

For unknown reasons, the original description by Camill Heller reports the type locality as "Java".
