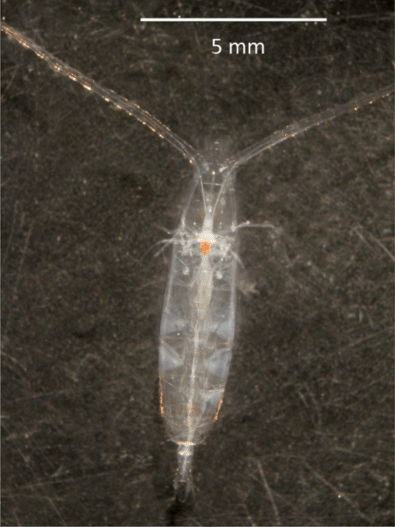
- Adult Rhincalanus gigas female.

Scientific classification
- Domain: Eukaryota
- Kingdom: Animalia
- Phylum: Arthropoda
- Class: Copepoda
- Order: Calanoida
- Family: Rhincalanidae
- Genus: Rhincalanus
- Species: R. gigas

Binomial name
- Rhincalanus gigas Brady, 1883

= Rhincalanus gigas =

Species of crustacean

Rhincalanus gigas is a large Antarctic copepod.

== Description ==
Rhincalanus gigas is a large copepod, with the female ranging in size from about 6.5 to 9.3 millimetres (0.26 to 0.37 in), and the male usually being between about 6.9 and 7.2 millimetres (0.27 and 0.28 in).

== Distribution ==
Rhincalanus gigas is found off of Antarctica, in addition to records off of South America, the Indian Ocean, and surrounding waters.
