= Iphimediidae =

Scientific classification
- Kingdom: Animalia
- Phylum: Arthropoda
- Clade: Pancrustacea
- Class: Malacostraca
- Order: Amphipoda
- Suborder: Amphilochidea
- Infraorder: Amphilochida
- Parvorder: Amphilochidira
- Superfamily: Iphimedioidea
- Family: Iphimediidae; Boeck, 1871

Family of crustaceans

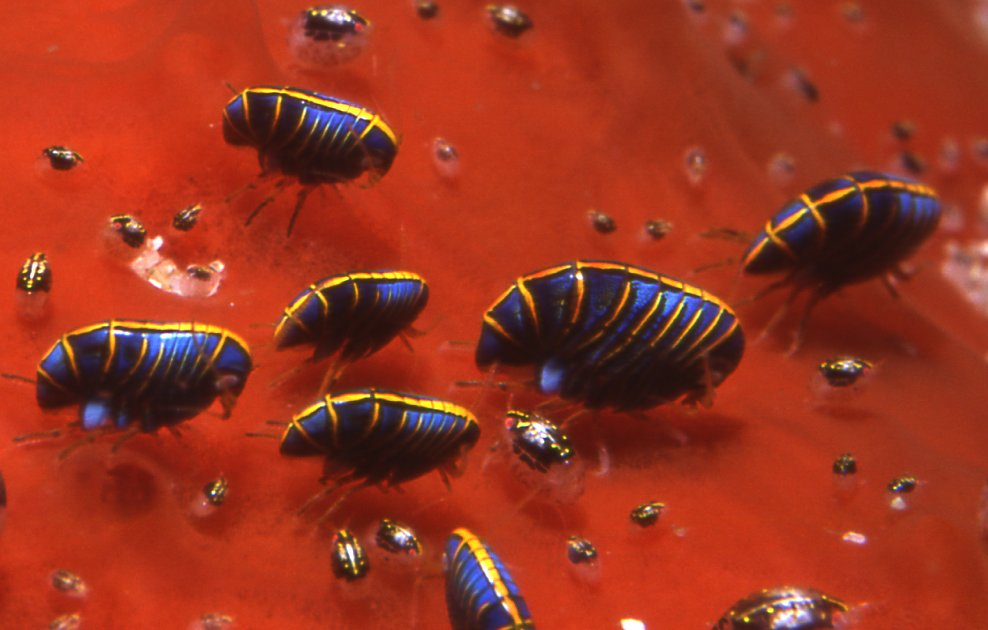
Hunchback amphipods Iphimedia gibba surrounded by ornate amphipods Cyproidea ornata on red sponge.

Iphimediidae is a family of amphipods belonging to the order Amphipoda.

Genera:

- Acanthozoma Boeck, 1876
- Anchiphimedia Barnard, 1930
- Anisoiphimedia Karaman, 1980
- Coboldus Krapp-Schickel, 1974
- Echiniphimedia Barnard, 1930
- Gnathiphimedia Barnard, 1930
- Iphimedia Rathke, 1843
- Iphimediella Chevreux, 1911
- Labriphimedia Barnard, 1931
- Maxilliphimedia Barnard, 1930
- Maximilliphimedia Barnard, 1930
- Nodotergum Bellan-Santini, 1972
- Paranchiphimedia Ruffo, 1949
- Parapanoploea Nicholls, 1938
- Pariphimedia Chevreux, 1906
- Pseudiphimediella Schellenberg, 1931
- Stegopanoploea Karaman, 1980
