= Maritimonautes obesus =

Conservation status
- Least Concern (IUCN 3.1)

Scientific classification
- Kingdom: Animalia
- Phylum: Arthropoda
- Class: Malacostraca
- Order: Decapoda
- Suborder: Pleocyemata
- Infraorder: Brachyura
- Family: Potamonautidae
- Genus: Maritimonautes
- Species: M. obesus

Binomial name
- Maritimonautes obesus A. Milne-Edwards, 1868

Species of crab

Maritimonautes obesus is a species of crab in the family Potamonautidae. It is found in Kenya, Malawi, Mozambique, Somalia, Tanzania, Zambia, and Zimbabwe. Its natural habitat is swamps.
