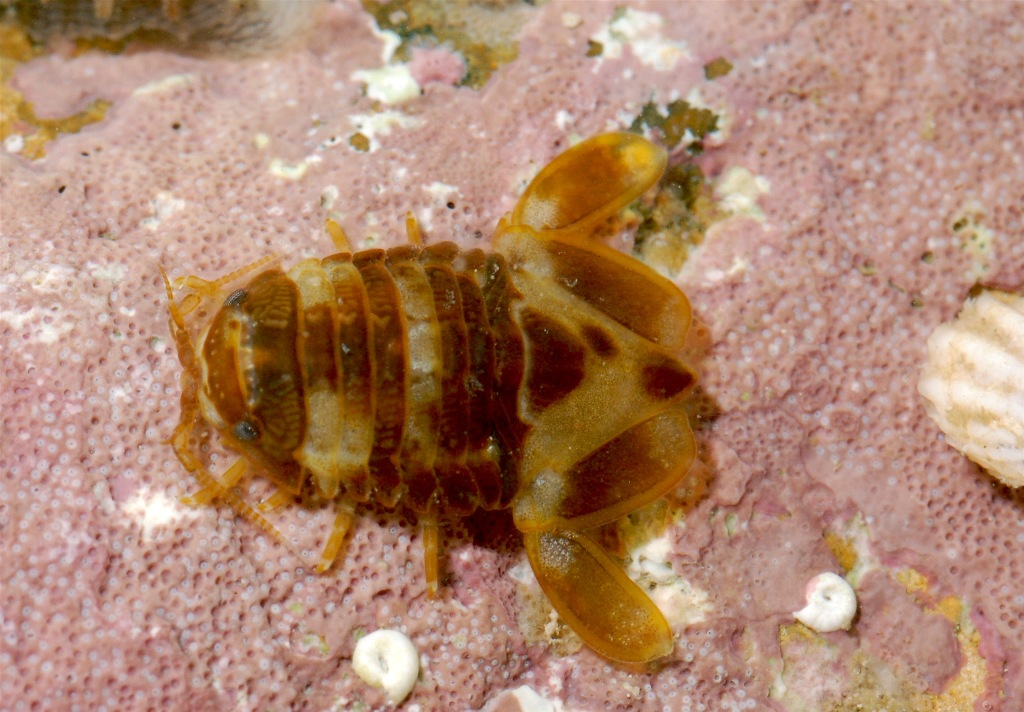
- Exosphaeroma planum

Scientific classification
- Kingdom: Animalia
- Phylum: Arthropoda
- Clade: Pancrustacea
- Class: Malacostraca
- Order: Isopoda
- Family: Sphaeromatidae
- Genus: Exosphaeroma; Stebbing, 1900

Type species
- Exosphaeroma gigas (Leach, 1818)

= Exosphaeroma =

Genus of crustaceans

Exosphaeroma is a genus of marine isopod of the family Sphaeromatidae. This genus is found in shallow ocean waters worldwide. It is notable for being one of the few genera of sphaeromatid to be found in the southern reaches of the Southern Ocean. The greatest diversity of Exosphaeroma occurs in the Southern Hemisphere.

== Species ==
The following species are recognised in the genus Exosphaeroma:

- Exosphaeroma agmokara Bruce, 2003
- Exosphaeroma alii Baker, 1926
- Exosphaeroma alveola Bruce, 2003
- Exosphaeroma amplicauda (Stimpson, 1857)
- Exosphaeroma antarctica Richardson, 1906
- Exosphaeroma antikraussi Barnard, 1940
- Exosphaeroma aphrodita Boone, 1923
- Exosphaeroma bicolor Baker, 1926
- Exosphaeroma brevitelson Barnard, 1914
- Exosphaeroma bruscai Espinosa-Pérez & Hendrickx, 2001
- Exosphaeroma chilensis Dana, 1853
- Exosphaeroma diminutum Menzies & Frankenberg, 1966
- Exosphaeroma echinensis Hurley & Jansen, 1977
- Exosphaeroma estuarium Barnard, 1951
- Exosphaeroma falcatum Tattersall, 1921
- Exosphaeroma gigas (Leach, 1818)
- Exosphaeroma hylecoetes Barnard, 1940
- Exosphaeroma inornata Dow, 1958
- Exosphaeroma kraussi Tattersall, 1913
- Exosphaeroma laevis (Baker, 1910)
- Exosphaeroma laeviusculum (Heller, 1868)
- Exosphaeroma media George & Stromberg, 1968
- Exosphaeroma montis (Hurley & Jansen, 1977)
- Exosphaeroma obtusum (Dana, 1853)
- Exosphaeroma octoncum (Richardson, 1897)
- Exosphaeroma pallidum Barnard, 1940
- Exosphaeroma parva Chilton, 1924
- Exosphaeroma paydenae Wall, Bruce & Wetzer, 2015
- Exosphaeroma pentcheffi Wall, Bruce & Wetzer, 2015
- Exosphaeroma planulum Hurley & Jansen, 1971
- Exosphaeroma planum Barnard, 1914
- Exosphaeroma porrectum Barnard, 1914
- Exosphaeroma rhomburum (Richardson, 1899)
- Exosphaeroma russellhansoni Wall, Bruce & Wetzer, 2015
- Exosphaeroma serventii Baker, 1928
- Exosphaeroma studeri Vanhöffen, 1914
- Exosphaeroma truncatitelson Barnard, 1940
- Exosphaeroma varicolor Barnard, 1914
- Exosphaeroma waitemata Bruce, 2005
