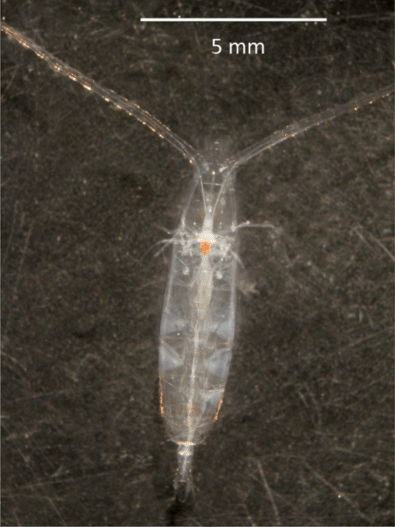
- Adult Rhincalanus gigas female.

Scientific classification
- Domain: Eukaryota
- Kingdom: Animalia
- Phylum: Arthropoda
- Class: Copepoda
- Order: Calanoida
- Family: Rhincalanidae; Geletin, 1976
- Genus: Rhincalanus; Dana, 1852

= Rhincalanus =

Genus of crustaceans

Rhincalanus is a genus of copepods belonging to the monotypic family Rhincalanidae.

The genus has almost cosmopolitan distribution.

Species:

- Rhincalanus cornutus (Dana, 1849)
- Rhincalanus gigas Brady, 1883
- Rhincalanus nasutus Giesbrecht, 1888
- Rhincalanus rostrifrons (Dana, 1849)
