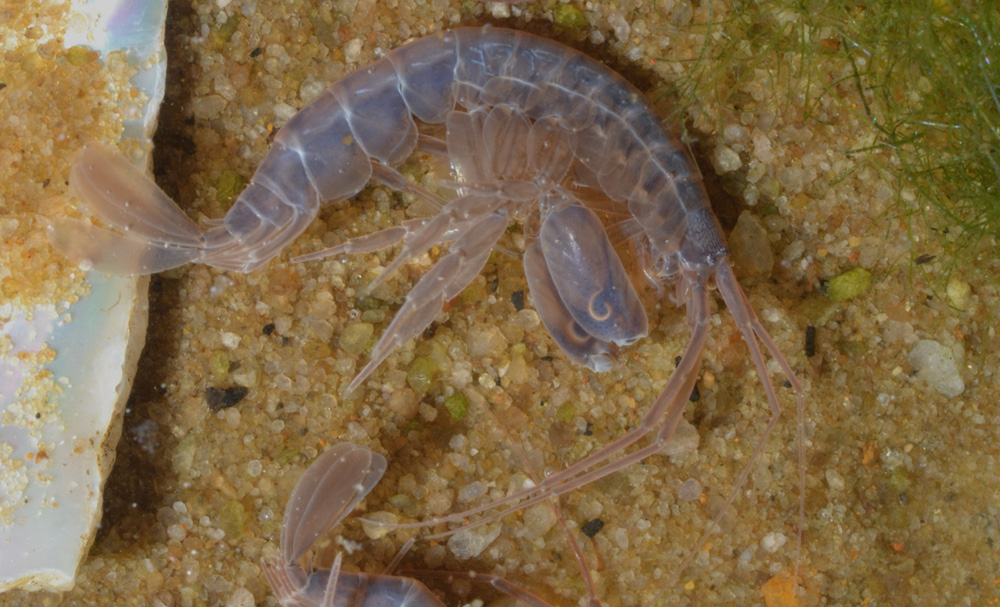
- Adult from Palmiet River lagoon. The intramuscular spring structure is visible in the dactylus.

Scientific classification
- Kingdom: Animalia
- Phylum: Arthropoda
- Clade: Pancrustacea
- Class: Malacostraca
- Order: Amphipoda
- Family: Maeridae
- Genus: Quadrivisio
- Species: Q. aviceps

Binomial name
- Quadrivisio aviceps (K. H. Barnard, 1940)

Synonyms
- Ceradocus aviceps K. H. Barnard, 1940

= Quadrivisio aviceps =

Species of crustacean

Quadrivisio aviceps is a species of estuarine amphipod known from two localities in South Africa. After its discovery in 1937, it was not recorded again until its rediscovery at the same location in 2015.

== Description ==
The species is relatively large for an amphipod, with an adult body length of 14–15 mm. The carapace is uniformly greyish-brown. The second gnathopod has a thickened terminal digit (dactylus) with a shape reminiscent of a bird's head, from which the specific name is derived.

A 2016 nanotomography analysis showed that the gnathopod contains an unusual horseshoe-shaped spring-like structure, which may enable the amphipod to produce forceful snaps in the manner of the pistol shrimp. As this structure is embedded in the retractor muscle itself rather than extraneous to it, it may represent a unique development in animals.

== Distribution and habitat ==
Quadrivisio aviceps is known only from its type locality in the Palmiet River lagoon near Kleinmond in the Western Cape of South Africa, at the junction of river and tidal areas, and from a locality on the estuary of the nearby Klein river, near Hermanus. It was first collected in 1937 and then not recorded again until a further collection at the type locality in 2015. The species may have a total distributional range of no more than a few km^{2}.
