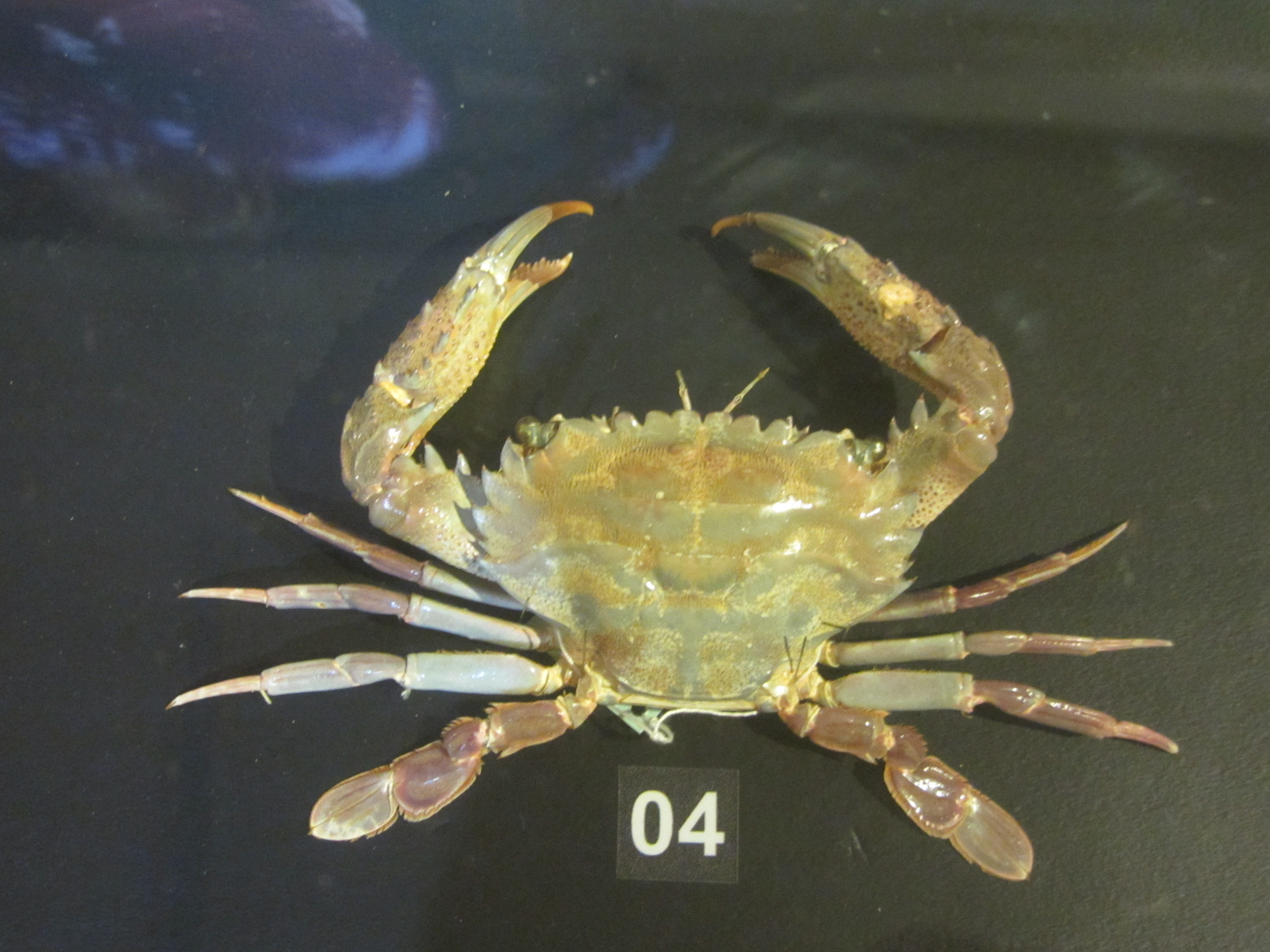

Scientific classification
- Kingdom: Animalia
- Phylum: Arthropoda
- Clade: Pancrustacea
- Class: Malacostraca
- Order: Decapoda
- Suborder: Pleocyemata
- Infraorder: Brachyura
- Family: Portunidae
- Genus: Thalamita
- Species: T. crenata

Binomial name
- Thalamita crenata Rüppell, 1830

Synonyms
- Thalamita kotoensis Tien, 1969

= Thalamita crenata =

Species of crab

Thalamita crenata, the mangrove swimming crab, crenate swimming crab or spiny rock crab, is a swimming crab species in the genus Thalamita. Distributed all over marine and brackish waters of Indo-West Pacific regions. It is widely used as an edible crab in many countries.

== Distribution ==
A mangrove inhabitant, it is found all over southern Red Sea, Somalia, Kenya, Mozambique, South Africa, Madagascar, Mauritius, Seychelles, Pakistan, India, Sri Lanka, Andaman Islands, Malay Peninsula, Sumatra, Thailand, Japan, Korea, Taiwan, China, Singapore, Indonesia, Vietnam and Australia.

== Description ==
Carapace round with five antero-lateral teeth. Carapace with 3 pairs of gastric ridges which is perfectly smooth. Male has long and thin first pleopod, which gradually tapering to tip.

== Ecology ==
The species usually forage at night feeds on many bivalves and slow-moving crustaceans. It is found in intertidal areas of mangrove swamps, consisting of Rhizophora mucronata zone and mangrove forests.

The crab is known to uses landmarks to locate its refuges using direct shortcut paths.
