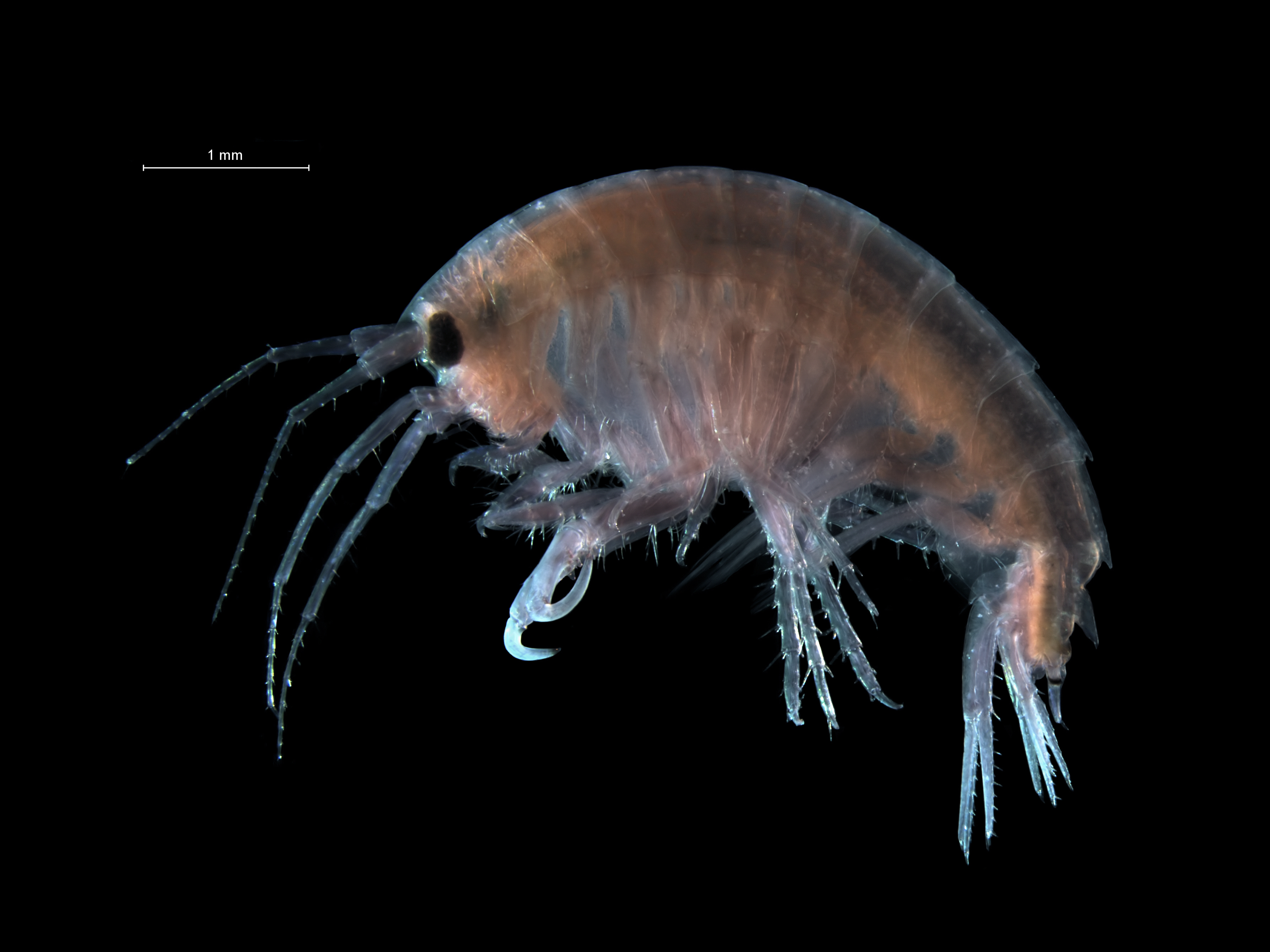
- Nototropis falcatus

Scientific classification
- Kingdom: Animalia
- Phylum: Arthropoda
- Clade: Pancrustacea
- Class: Malacostraca
- Order: Amphipoda
- Superfamily: Dexaminoidea
- Family: Atylidae; Lilljeborg, 1865

= Atylidae =

Family of crustaceans

Atylidae is a family of amphipod crustaceans, containing the following genera:

- Anatylus Bulycheva, 1955
- Kamehatylus J. L. Barnard, 1970
- Austroniphargus Monod, 1925
- Sandro Karaman & Barnard, 1979
- Atylus Leach, 1815
- Lepechinella Stebbing, 1908
- Lepechinelloides Thurston, 1980
- Lepechinellopsis Ledoyer, 1983
- Paralepechinella Pirlot, 1933
- Aberratylus Bousfield & Kendall, 1994
- Nototropis Costa, 1853
