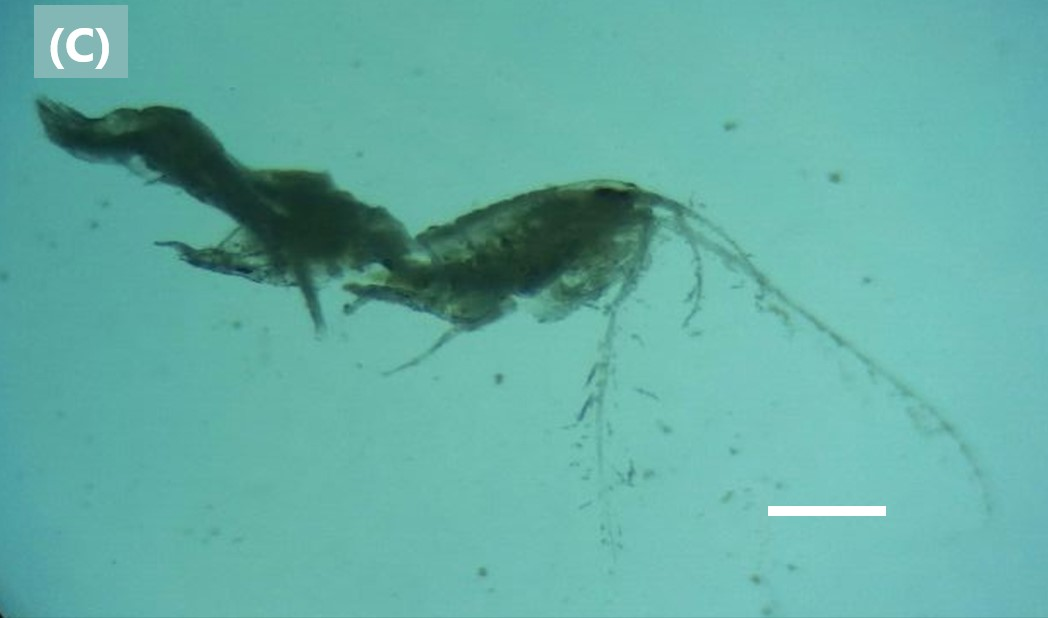

Scientific classification
- Kingdom: Animalia
- Phylum: Arthropoda
- Clade: Pancrustacea
- Class: Malacostraca
- Order: Amphipoda
- Family: Melitidae
- Genus: Dulichiella
- Species: D. appendiculata

Binomial name
- Dulichiella appendiculata (Say, 1818)

Synonyms
- Dulichiella dentata (Krøyer, 1842) sensu Pearse, 1912; Dulichiella appendiculatus Say, 1818

= Dulichiella appendiculata =

Species of crustacean

Dulichiella appendiculata is a species of amphipod in the family Melitidae. It was first described by Thomas Say in 1818. No subspecies are listed in the Catalogue of Life.

This type of animal is scattered throughout:

- North Atlantic Ocean
- Mexico
- United States
- Venezuela
- Costa Rica
- Cuba
