= Feeder shrimp =

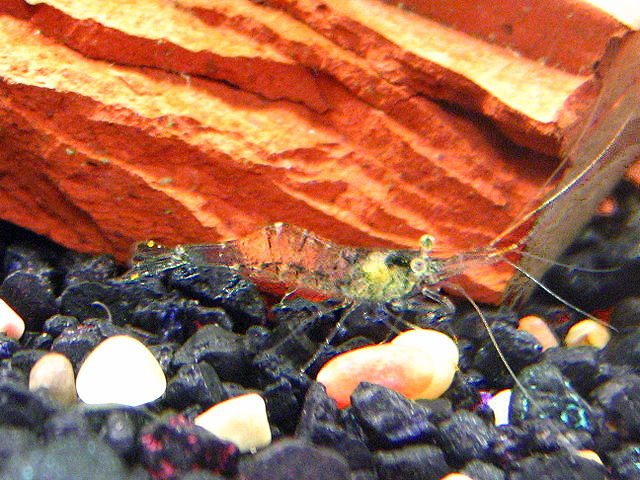
P. paludosus in a freshwater aquarium

Feeder shrimp, ghost shrimp, glass shrimp, grass shrimp, river shrimp or feeder prawns are generic names applied to inexpensive small, typically with a length of 1 to 3 cm (0.39 to 1.18 in), semi-transparent crustaceans commonly sold and fed as live prey to larger more aggressive fishes kept in aquariums.

== Types ==
They can belong to these families and genera:

- Family Crangonidae

- Genus Crangon: Crangon crangon

- Family Palaemonidae

- Genus Palaemon: Palaemon varians, Palaemon serratus, Palaemon elegans, Palaemon pacificus
- Genus Palaemonetes: Palaemonetes paludosus, Palaemonetes kadiakensis, Palaemonetes pugio
- Genus Macrobrachium: Macrobrachium nipponense, Macrobrachium lamarrei (Indian whisker shrimp), Macrobrachium australiense

- Family Penaeidae

- Genus Litopenaeus: Litopenaeus vannamei

- Family Atyidae

- Genus Caridina: Caridina flavilineata
- Genus Neocaridina: Neocaridina davidi

== Advantages of using feeder shrimp ==
They almost always available for sale at local pet stores as well as at the larger chain stores. At the pet shop, they are frequently kept in a small tank with other shrimp of their kind. They are also relatively easy freshwater aquarium shrimp to keep.

They are a scavenger type of saltwater or freshwater shrimp and a good aquarium cleaner for being constantly on the prowl searching for something to eat. They are omnivores and will subsist on a diet made up of tiny bits of uneaten food, dead, decaying plant matter or other soft edible matter accumulating on the bottom of the tank.

Ghost shrimp are safe with most fish and invertebrates and will not eat live aquatic plants. They look good when kept in a tank with black aquarium gravel or substrate and also good to keep them in a tank with a black background.

They help enhance the coloration of aquarium fish by containing high levels of carotenoid pigments, like astaxanthin and canthaxanthin.

== Diet of feeder shrimp ==
In the wild, these crustaceans mostly feed on an herbivorous diet since there is an abundance of plant matter in their near vicinity. Nibbling at live plants is one of their favorite ways of satiating hunger. They are also heavily dependent on algae, especially hair algae, and are regarded as one of the most prolific algae-eaters out there. Other than that, you will also see them feeding on insect larvae and eggs.

When hosting a Ghost Shrimp in an aquarium, you can feed them a diet that is extremely diverse. Therefore, include Brine Shrimp, Algae wafer, Daphnia, Spirulina, Bloodworm, Indian almond leaves, and Mosquito larvae.

Aquatic plants such as Hornwort and Java Moss also serve as great food sources for them. When it comes to the quantity of food that needs to be served, it depends on how much algae is there in your aquarium. The more algae there are, the less food you need to provide them and vice versa. Try and provide them different kinds of food at different times of the day in small portions. Don't over-feed them since they already have a tendency to eat non-stop.

== See also ==
- Bait fish
- Fishing bait
- Bait (luring substance)
