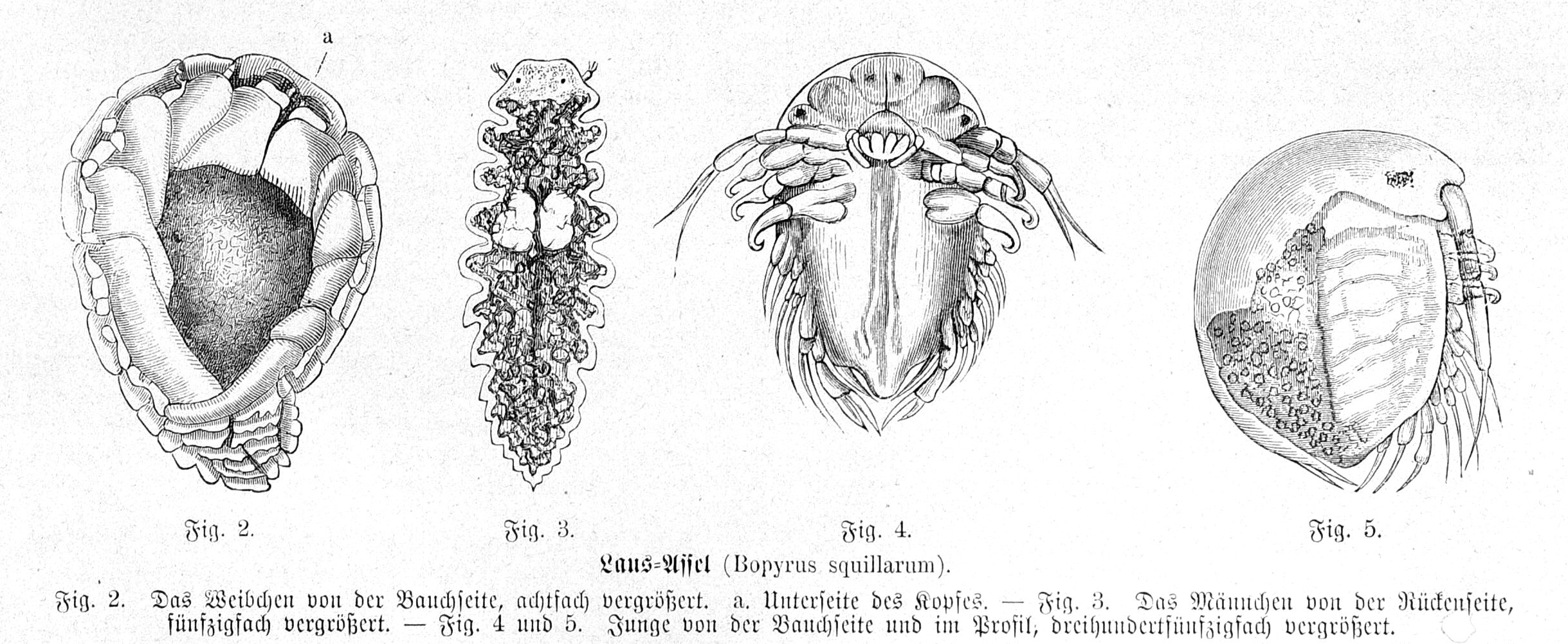

Scientific classification
- Kingdom: Animalia
- Phylum: Arthropoda
- Class: Malacostraca
- Order: Isopoda
- Family: Bopyridae
- Genus: Bopyrus
- Species: B. squillarum

Binomial name
- Bopyrus squillarum Latreille, 1802

= Bopyrus squillarum =

Species of isopod

Bopyrus squillarum is an isopod parasite of the infraorder Epicaridea. As such, B. squillarum is an ectoparasite, feeding off crustaceans hemolymph. This parasite is specific to common prawns (Palaemon serratus), but can rarely be found on other species of the genus Palaemon such as P. elegans.

== Distribution ==
Bopyrus squillarum can be found in marine habitats all along the northeast Atlantic coast as well as the north sea. The number of B. squillarum infections seem to vary over the years, as studies have shown infection rates ranging from 6.4% to 20.1% between 1969 and 2014 along the Irish coast.

== Biology ==
During its planktonic larval stage, the young B. squillarum attaches to a young P. serratus and settles down in its branchial chamber. As the parasite and the prawn grow up, the parasite creates a bulge in the prawns carapace. The female B. squillarum is much bigger than the male and is the parasite that attaches to the host. The smaller male will attach itself to a female to breed. While present, B. squillarum will lead to a reduction in its hosts gonads and prevent the host's reproduction. The B. squillarum parasite has a shorter lifespan than its host, falling out of the branchial chamber of the prawn upon death.
