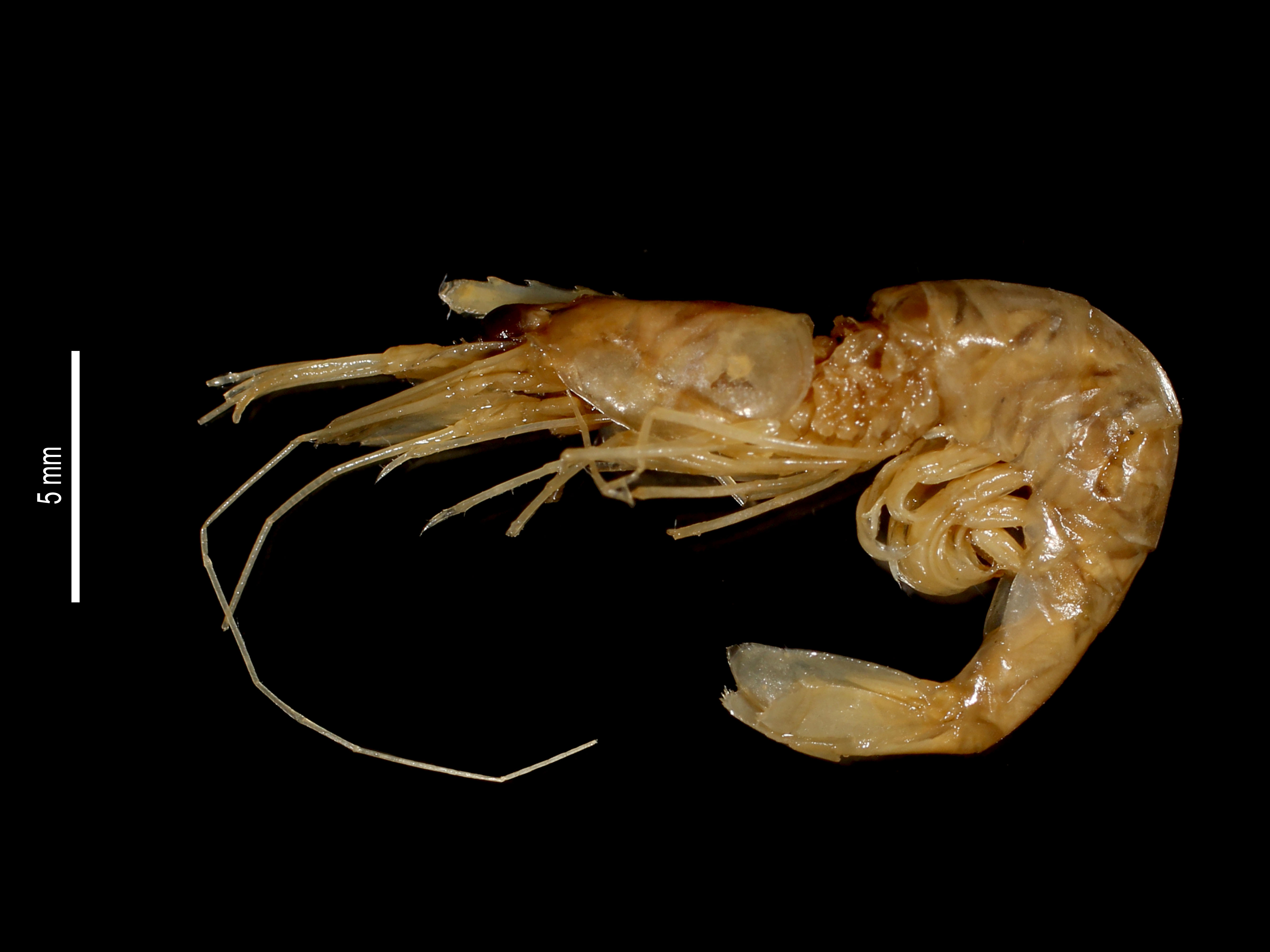

Scientific classification
- Kingdom: Animalia
- Phylum: Arthropoda
- Clade: Pancrustacea
- Class: Malacostraca
- Order: Decapoda
- Suborder: Pleocyemata
- Infraorder: Caridea
- Family: Palaemonidae
- Genus: Palaemon
- Species: P. pandaliformis

Binomial name
- Palaemon pandaliformis William Stimpson, 1871

= Palaemon pandaliformis =

Species of crustacean

Palaemon pandaliformis is a species of shrimp of the family Palaemonidae. It is found along with Palaemon northropi.
