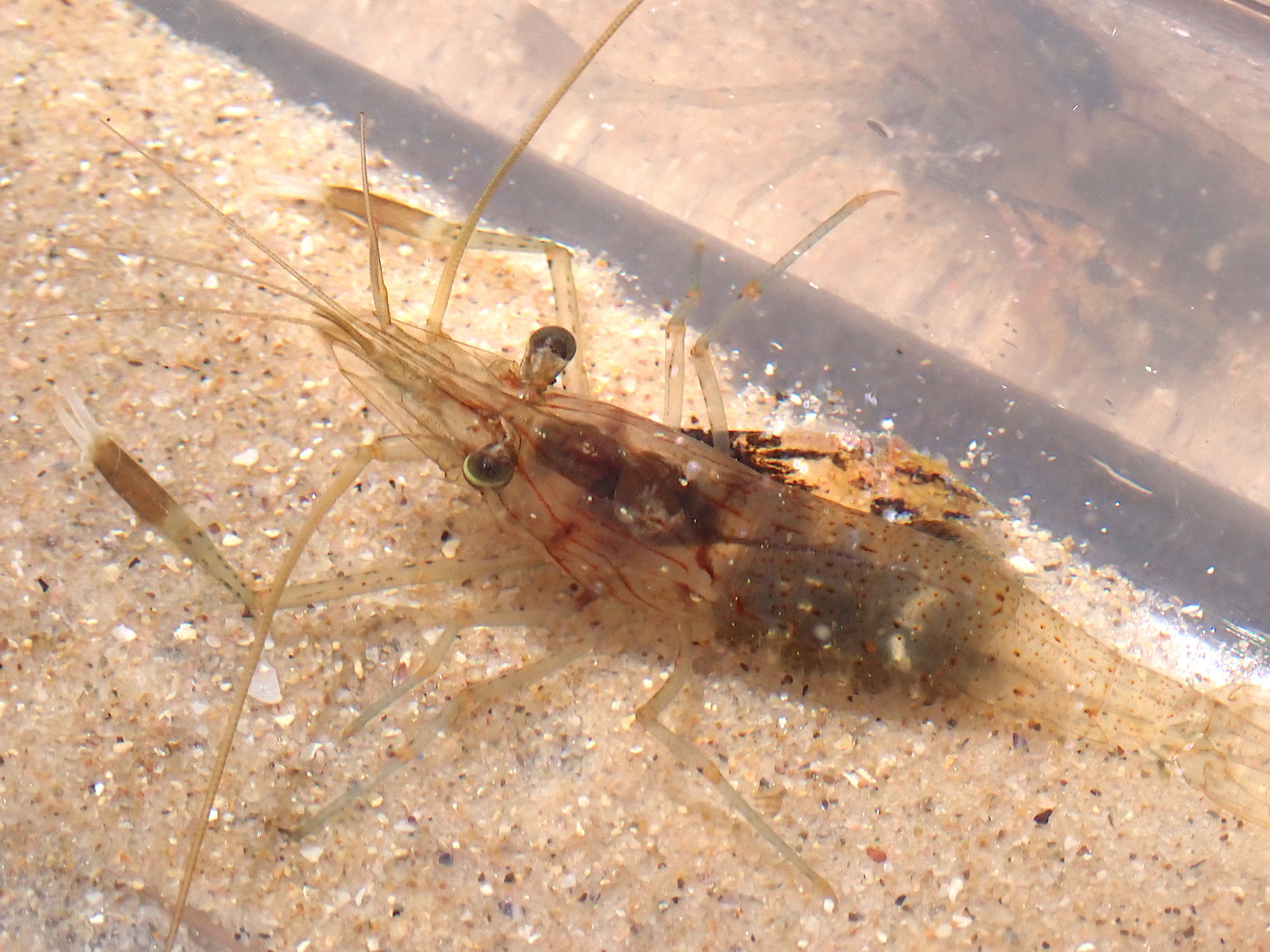

Scientific classification
- Kingdom: Animalia
- Phylum: Arthropoda
- Clade: Pancrustacea
- Class: Malacostraca
- Order: Decapoda
- Suborder: Pleocyemata
- Infraorder: Caridea
- Family: Palaemonidae
- Genus: Palaemon
- Species: P. serenus

Binomial name
- Palaemon serenus (Heller, 1862)

Synonyms
- Leander serenus Heller, 1862

= Palaemon serenus =

Species of crustacean

Palaemon serenus, commonly known as the red-handed shrimp, rockpool shrimp, or rock-pool prawn, is a species of marine shrimp in the family Palaemonidae native to southern and eastern Australia. They are omnivores, feeding on algae or scavenging for animal matter.

== Description ==
Measuring up to 6 cm (2.4 in) long, Palaemon serenus has a transparent body with reddish spots and flecks arranged longitudinally along the abdomen and oblique red lines on the carapace. The second pair of legs are elongated, with small white claws and a bright red band near the claws. Females are larger than males and carry eggs under the abdomen.

Palaemon serenus characteristics is closely related to Palaemon affinis, a sprawn species that is abundant in the coast of New Zealand. Their transparent body allows them to blend with their rocky habitat and escape from predator.

== Distribution and habitat ==
Palaemon serenus can be found in the coastal waters of southern and eastern Australia, including New South Wales, Queensland, Victoria, South Australia, Tasmania, and Western Australia. It inhabits intertidal areas, coastal reefs, and seagrass meadows down to depths of 12 m (39 ft). They can also be found in high salinity zones within estuaries.
