= Palaemon ivonicus =

Scientific classification
- Kingdom: Animalia
- Phylum: Arthropoda
- Clade: Pancrustacea
- Class: Malacostraca
- Order: Decapoda
- Suborder: Pleocyemata
- Infraorder: Caridea
- Family: Palaemonidae
- Genus: Palaemon
- Species: P. ivonicus

Binomial name
- Palaemon ivonicus (Holthuis, 1950)

Species of crustacean

Palaemon ivonicus is a species of shrimp of the family Palaemonidae. There is some speculation that this species may be the same as Palaemon carteri.
