= Palaemon semmelinkii =

Scientific classification
- Kingdom: Animalia
- Phylum: Arthropoda
- Clade: Pancrustacea
- Class: Malacostraca
- Order: Decapoda
- Suborder: Pleocyemata
- Infraorder: Caridea
- Family: Palaemonidae
- Genus: Palaemon
- Species: P. semmelinkii

Binomial name
- Palaemon semmelinkii (de Man, 1881)

Species of crustacean

Palaemon semmelinkii is a species of shrimp of the family Palaemonidae. It can be found in mangrove forests in Asia.
