= Palaemon capensis =

Conservation status
- Least Concern (IUCN 3.1)

Scientific classification
- Kingdom: Animalia
- Phylum: Arthropoda
- Clade: Pancrustacea
- Class: Malacostraca
- Order: Decapoda
- Suborder: Pleocyemata
- Infraorder: Caridea
- Family: Palaemonidae
- Genus: Palaemon
- Species: P. capensis

Binomial name
- Palaemon capensis De Man in M. Weber, 1897

Species of crustacean

Palaemon capensis is a species of shrimp of the family Palaemonidae. It is endemic to the Eastern Cape province of South Africa, where it lives in both fresh and brackish water.
