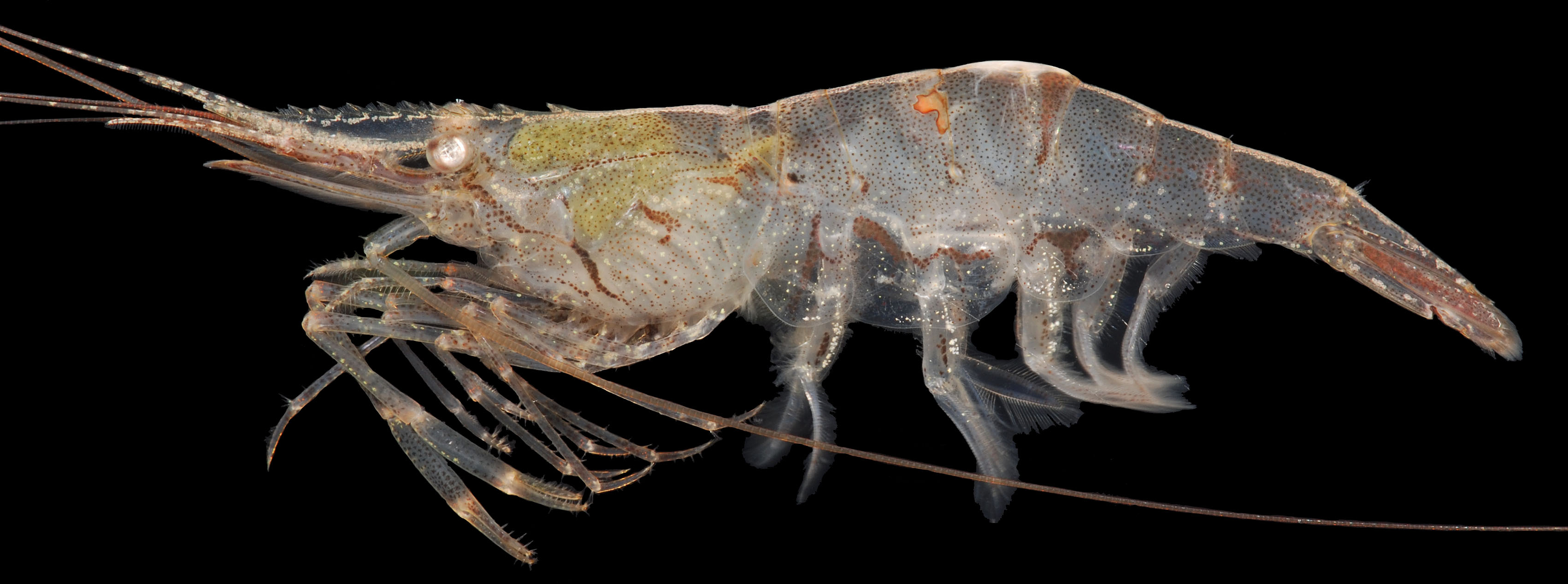

Scientific classification
- Kingdom: Animalia
- Phylum: Arthropoda
- Clade: Pancrustacea
- Class: Malacostraca
- Order: Decapoda
- Suborder: Pleocyemata
- Infraorder: Caridea
- Family: Palaemonidae
- Genus: Palaemon
- Species: P. macrodactylus

Binomial name
- Palaemon macrodactylus Rathbun, 1902

= Palaemon macrodactylus =

Species of crustacean

Palaemon macrodactylus is a species of shrimp of the family Palaemonidae.

== Invasive profile and global distribution ==
Palaemon macrodactylus is native to Japan, Korea, and Northern China. It is, additionally, native to the Far East region of Russia, or the Northwest area of the Pacific Ocean. In 1957, the first non-native P. macrodactylus was accidentally introduced to San Francisco Bay, USA. Nowadays, it is officially considered as an invasive species in California, USA, and very abundant. In Northern America, P. macrodactylus can also be found in the US states of Washington, Oregon, Virginia, Connecticut, and New York. In the early 2000s, P. macrodactylus made its first appearance in Australia and Argentina. It is thought that its introduction was accidental via discharge of ballast water from the US to Mar De Plata harbor in Argentina. This was first reported in the southwestern Atlantic coast. Along the Atlantic coasts of Europe, it can be found at different localities such as Southwestern Spain. or Southeastern England, as well as France, Belgium, and the Netherlands. It is invasive because it successfully colonized the northeastern pacific coast and estuaries.

== Mode of introduction and dispersal ==
Palaemon macrodactylus naturally tolerates moderate salinity levels, inhabiting brackish water. This tolerance allows P. macrodactylus to inhabit a wide variety of habitats across the world. One of the factors most influential in the success of P. macrodactylus introduction process is temperature. Environmental temperature directly influences the reproducing rate of female individuals, as well as the timing and duration of breeding season (optimal between 15 and 27 °C (59 and 81 °F)).

The most common mode of introduction for P. macrodactylus is shipping, mostly via the discharge of ballast water. In particular, local shipping to suitable regions that have not been inhabited with any of the species community effectively introduces P. macrodactylus to new habitats marked by preferential temperature regimes. Infra-regional shipping securely expands the oriental shrimps' territories. Nevertheless, it is actually a threatened species listed in the China Red Data Book, despite having a broad native range with high reproductive potential. P. macrodactylus could also be spread naturally through larval dispersal, although it is less likely to occur in nature statistically.

== Male and female characteristics ==
Male individuals are typically 9.7 to 13.5 mm (0.38 to 0.53 in) in length. Ovigerous females, meaning that they bear eggs, are approximately 16.5 to 19 mm (0.65 to 0.75 in) in length. These females carry approximately 150-2000 eggs. Females that do not bear eggs are typically 11.8 to 14.1 mm (0.46 to 0.56 in) in length. Females tend to be larger than males and are pigmented with red spots on the body surface with white longitudinal stripes going down the back. The body of males are transparent with a reddish hue on the tail fan and antennary area. Due to the similarities in morphology, it is not simple to distinguish between the local species and the alien, meaning introduced, species. Embryos are able to develop in vitro in conditions similar to adults, but the full development of these embryos are more successful in high salinity conditions.

== Habitat and environment ==
Palaemon macrodactylus has a broad water tolerance range, which allows it to occupy a variety of aquatic environments around the world, including brackish and marine coastal waters. Its optimal salinity range is between 5 and 15 part per thousand (ppt), which is considered moderately saline water. P. macrodactylus primarily utilizes the low salinity regions of estuaries. They also favor pilings, walls, debris, and other forms of shelter as habitats and are often most abundant in lower-salinity waters.

== Natural behavior ==
Palaemon macrodactylus typically eats plants, mysids such as Neomysis, amphipods, and crabs. Particularly, its primary natural food sources are recorded to be Corophium (so called "mud shrimp") or Rhithropanopeus (so called "Harris mud crab"). They prefer rubble, man-made structures, and vegetation as foraging habitats, and experimental studies demonstrate a strong preference for even unfamiliar structural elements, including plastic Army men. P. macrodactylus are considered as osmoregulators and just like their related resident species. The similarities among these species often puts them in direct competition for dietary resources. What's more, when densities of these competing species reach a critical limit, cannibalism has been reported.

== Reproduction ==
The mode of reproduction is called dioecism which means that an individual shrimp can have male reproductive system or a female reproductive system. In shrimps, a courting ritual is common and mating consists of indirect sperm transfer which is through olfactory and tactile cues. For the regulator shrimp, the general mating process happens when a male shrimp is at a ninety degree angle from a female shrimp. The male shrimp then transfers its spermatophore onto an area on the female's abdomen. Within 6–20 hours, the females begin to produce eggs. For P. macrodactylus, their mating season is from mid April to early October.

== Environmental and ecological impacts ==
Palaemon macrodactylus preys on smaller shrimps such as Corophium or Rhithropanopeus. According to a study by Richard Sitts and Allen Knight published in 1979, P. macrodactylus is mainly carnivorous because animal fragments are commonly found to be excessive compared to plant materials in their foreguts. However, many argue that Palaemon macrodactylus is instead omnivorous and plants are also included in their source of nutrition.

Palaemon macrodactylus is competitive against Crangon franciscorum and Palaemon longirostris. According to a study in Sacramento-San Joaquin River Delta, California, P. macrodactylus and C. franciscorum both prey on Neomysis mercedis, an opossum shrimp. However, due to the difference in body size between the two species (P. macrodactylus is generally smaller than C. franciscorum), P. macrodactylus consumes smaller individuals, resulting in resource partitioning. Thus, no serious damaging effects have been detected since P. macrodactylus exploited niches that are overlooked by the two other species. Since there is an abundance of this shrimp in Japan, people catch these shrimps and sell them as food.

== Management and control ==
Even though Palaemon macrodactylus has been classified as a highly invasive species in many regions worldwide, there is no published attempt to control the widespread and invasiveness of any population of the organism at the moment. In fact, no specific surveillance program tailored for monitoring the spread of Palaemon macrodactylus is available.
