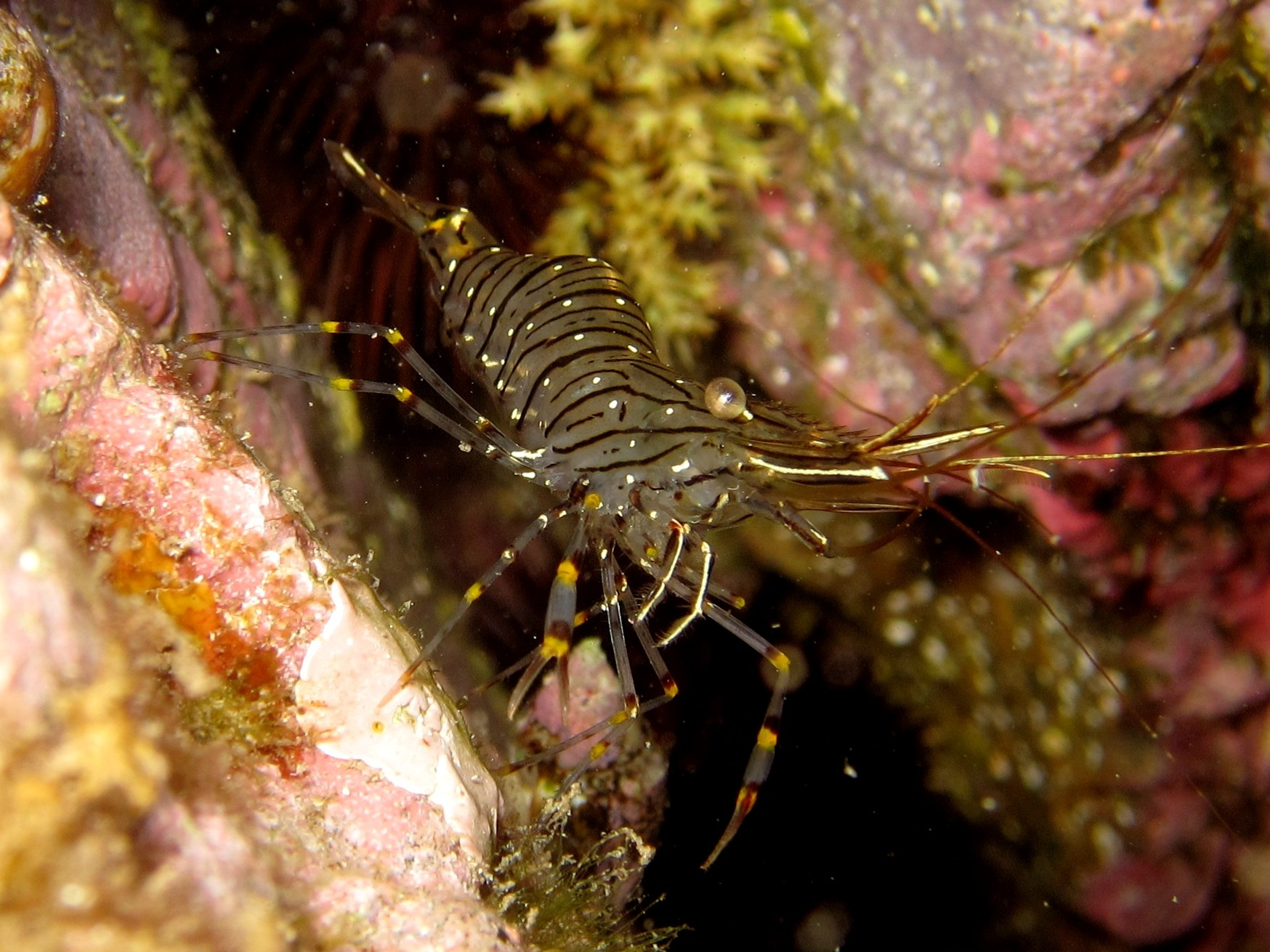

Scientific classification
- Kingdom: Animalia
- Phylum: Arthropoda
- Clade: Pancrustacea
- Class: Malacostraca
- Order: Decapoda
- Suborder: Pleocyemata
- Infraorder: Caridea
- Family: Palaemonidae
- Genus: Palaemon
- Species: P. elegans

Binomial name
- Palaemon elegans Martin Rathke, 1837

= Palaemon elegans =

Species of crustacean

Palaemon elegans sometimes known by the common name rockpool shrimp, is a species of shrimp of the family Palaemonidae. It is native to the eastern North Atlantic (including Macaronesia), the Baltic, the Mediterranean and the Black Sea, and introduced in the Caspian and Aral seas. It is similar to three other members of the genus Palaemon: Palaemon serratus, Palaemon longirostris and Palaemon adspersus, and has displaced or replaced populations of Palaemon adspersus in some locations. It is considered an invasive species in parts of the United States.
