= Palaemon khori =

Scientific classification
- Kingdom: Animalia
- Phylum: Arthropoda
- Clade: Pancrustacea
- Class: Malacostraca
- Order: Decapoda
- Suborder: Pleocyemata
- Infraorder: Caridea
- Family: Palaemonidae
- Genus: Palaemon
- Species: P. khori

Binomial name
- Palaemon khori De Grave & Al-Maslamani, 2006

Species of crustacean

Palaemon khori is a species of shrimp of the family Palaemonidae. It is native to the mangrove swamps of Qatar.
