= Palaemon gracilis =

Scientific classification
- Kingdom: Animalia
- Phylum: Arthropoda
- Clade: Pancrustacea
- Class: Malacostraca
- Order: Decapoda
- Suborder: Pleocyemata
- Infraorder: Caridea
- Family: Palaemonidae
- Genus: Palaemon
- Species: P. gracilis

Binomial name
- Palaemon gracilis Smith, 1871

Species of crustacean

Palaemon gracilis is a species of shrimp of the family Palaemonidae.
