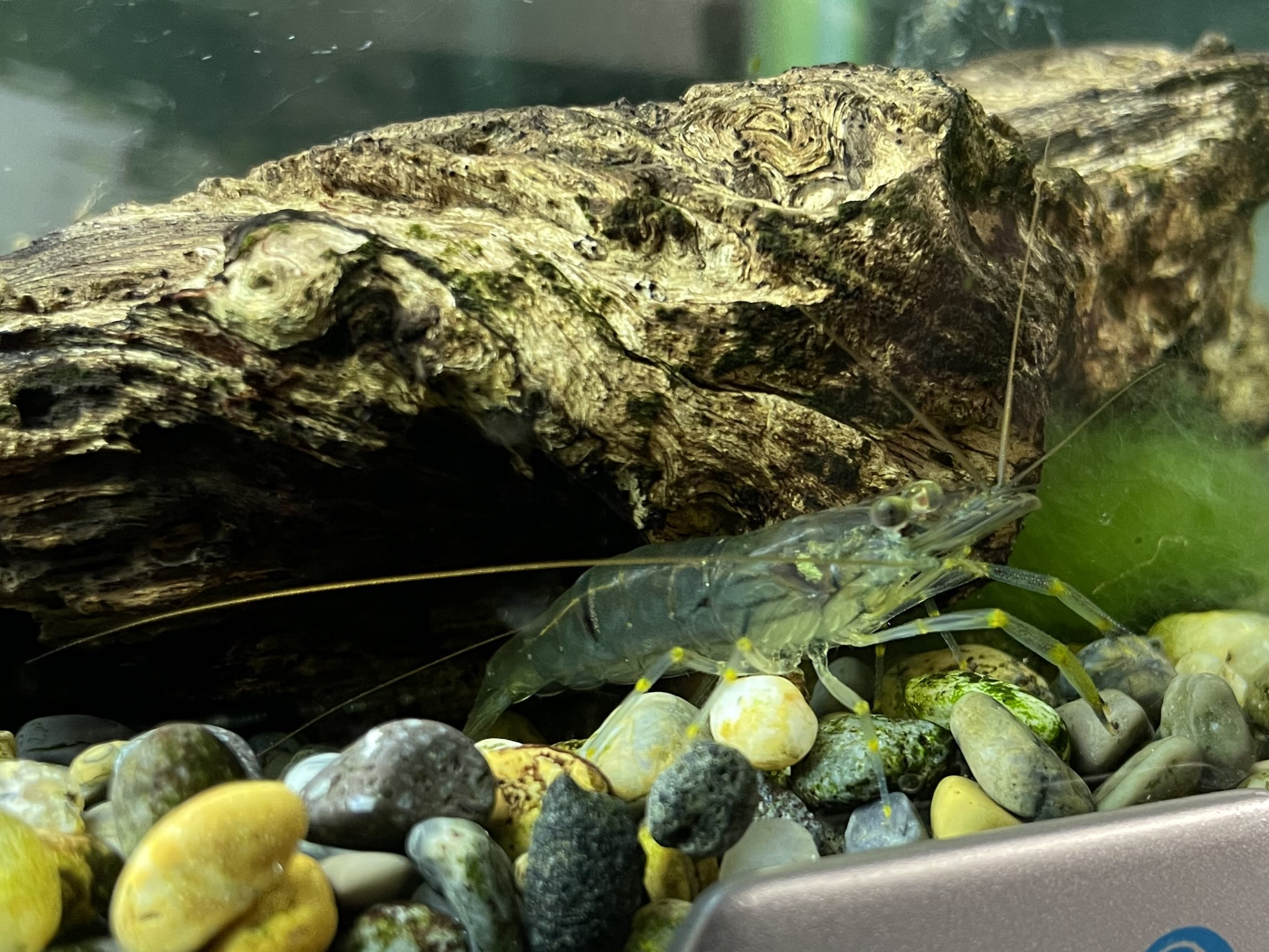

Scientific classification
- Kingdom: Animalia
- Phylum: Arthropoda
- Clade: Pancrustacea
- Class: Malacostraca
- Order: Decapoda
- Suborder: Pleocyemata
- Infraorder: Caridea
- Family: Palaemonidae
- Genus: Palaemon
- Species: P. ogasawaraensis

Binomial name
- Palaemon ogasawaraensis Kato & Takeda, 1981

= Palaemon ogasawaraensis =

Species of crustacean

Palaemon ogasawaraensis is a species of shrimp of the family Palaemonidae. It is native to the Ogasawara Islands.
