= Palaemon floridanus =

Scientific classification
- Kingdom: Animalia
- Phylum: Arthropoda
- Clade: Pancrustacea
- Class: Malacostraca
- Order: Decapoda
- Suborder: Pleocyemata
- Infraorder: Caridea
- Family: Palaemonidae
- Genus: Palaemon
- Species: P. floridanus

Binomial name
- Palaemon floridanus Chace, 1942

Species of crustacean

Palaemon floridanus, also known as the Florida grass shrimp, is a species of shrimp of the family Palaemonidae.

== Distribution and habitat ==
P. floridanus is found around the state of Florida and the Caribbean Sea. Within this range, it inhabits a wide range of intertidal and subtidal environments, including rocky tidal pools, mangrove swamps, coral terraces, and man-made jetties and wharfs.
