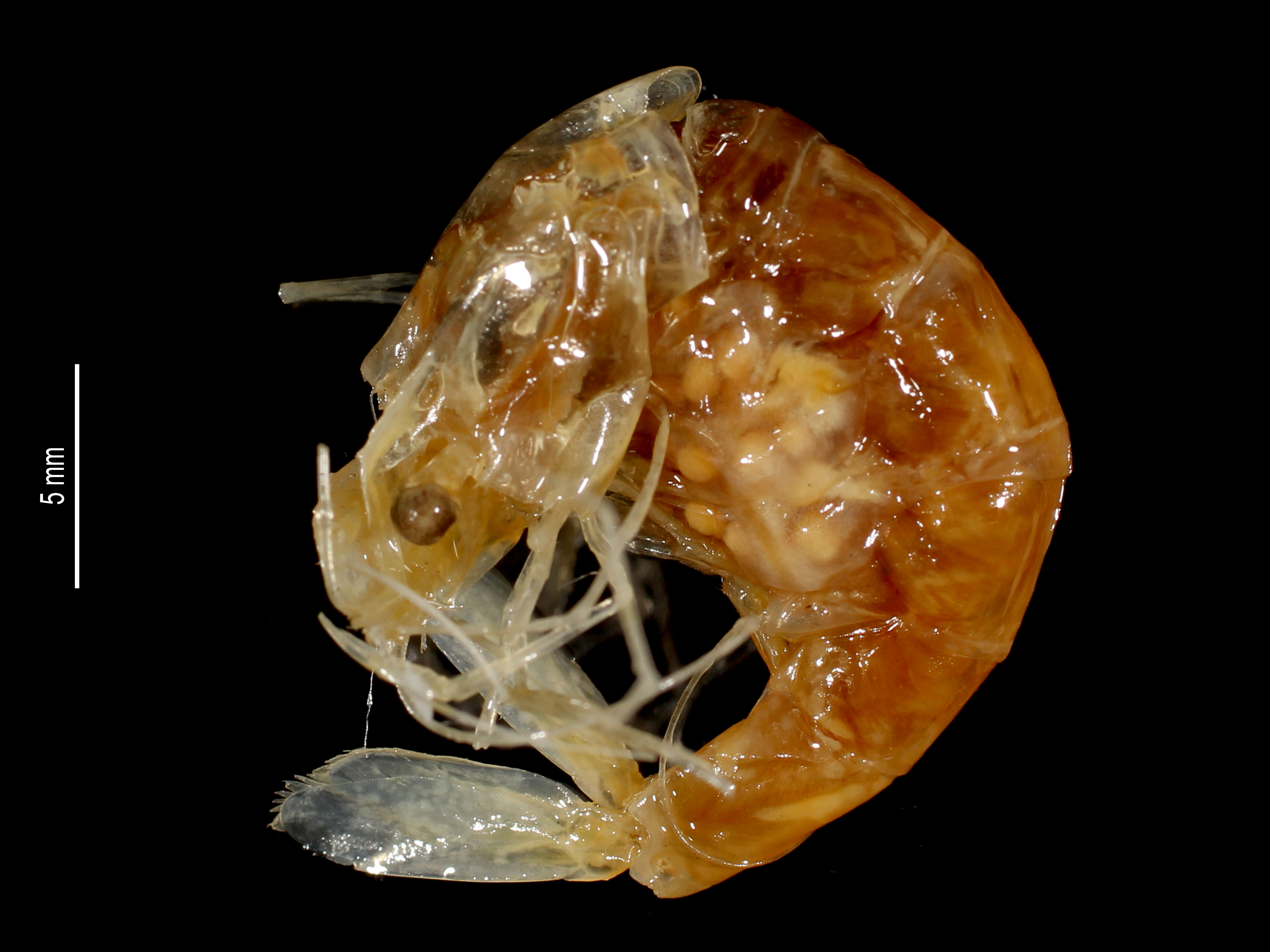

Scientific classification
- Domain: Eukaryota
- Kingdom: Animalia
- Phylum: Arthropoda
- Class: Malacostraca
- Order: Decapoda
- Suborder: Pleocyemata
- Infraorder: Caridea
- Family: Palaemonidae
- Genus: Palaemon
- Species: P. modestus

Binomial name
- Palaemon modestus (Heller, 1862) .

= Palaemon modestus =

Species of crustacean

Palaemon modestus, the Siberian prawn, is a species of freshwater shrimp from eastern Asia. A revision to Palaemon in 2013 moved Palaemon modestus to the Palaemon genus from the Exopalaemon genus.
