= Palaemon ritteri =

Scientific classification
- Kingdom: Animalia
- Phylum: Arthropoda
- Clade: Pancrustacea
- Class: Malacostraca
- Order: Decapoda
- Suborder: Pleocyemata
- Infraorder: Caridea
- Family: Palaemonidae
- Genus: Palaemon
- Species: P. ritteri

Binomial name
- Palaemon ritteri Holmes, 1895

Species of crustacean

Palaemon ritteri is a species of shrimp of the family Palaemonidae. It lives in both the Atlantic and Pacific Oceans surrounding South America.
