= Palaemon xiphias =

Scientific classification
- Kingdom: Animalia
- Phylum: Arthropoda
- Clade: Pancrustacea
- Class: Malacostraca
- Order: Decapoda
- Suborder: Pleocyemata
- Infraorder: Caridea
- Family: Palaemonidae
- Genus: Palaemon
- Species: P. xiphias

Binomial name
- Palaemon xiphias Risso, 1816

Species of crustacean

Palaemon xiphias is a species of shrimp of the family Palaemonidae. It is found in the eastern Central Atlantic and the Mediterranean.
