= Palaemon australis =

Scientific classification
- Kingdom: Animalia
- Phylum: Arthropoda
- Clade: Pancrustacea
- Class: Malacostraca
- Order: Decapoda
- Suborder: Pleocyemata
- Infraorder: Caridea
- Family: Palaemonidae
- Genus: Palaemon
- Species: P. australis

Binomial name
- Palaemon australis (Dakin, 1915)

Species of freshwater shrimp

Palaemon australis is a species of freshwater shrimp in the family Palaemonidae that occurs in Southwest Australia from Jurien Bay to Esperence.
