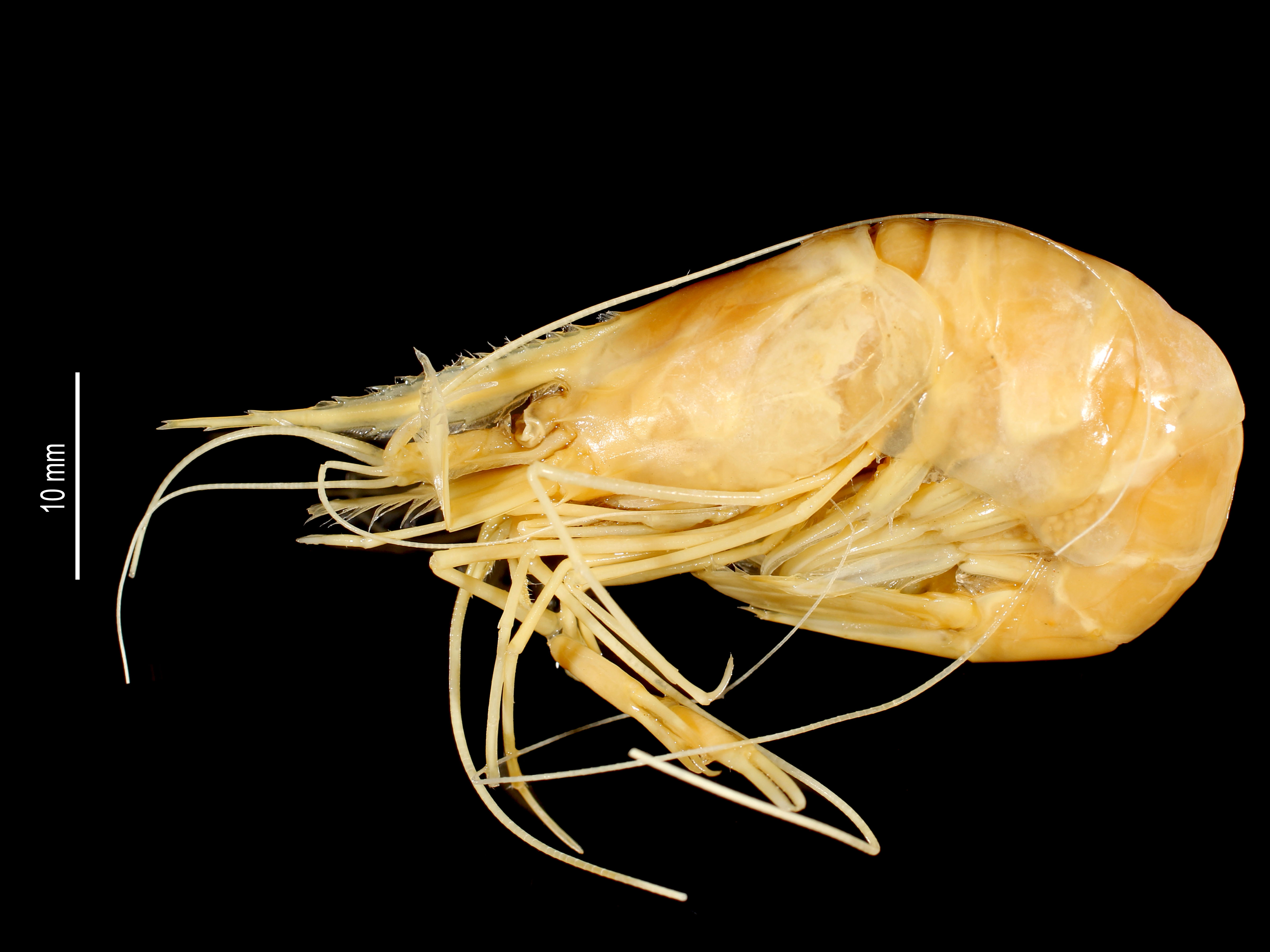

Scientific classification
- Kingdom: Animalia
- Phylum: Arthropoda
- Clade: Pancrustacea
- Class: Malacostraca
- Order: Decapoda
- Suborder: Pleocyemata
- Infraorder: Caridea
- Family: Palaemonidae
- Genus: Palaemon
- Species: P. gravieri

Binomial name
- Palaemon gravieri Yu, 1930

= Palaemon gravieri =

Species of crustacean

Palaemon gravieri is a species of shrimp of the family Palaemonidae. They are found in Korea.
