= Palaemon vicinus =

Scientific classification
- Kingdom: Animalia
- Phylum: Arthropoda
- Clade: Pancrustacea
- Class: Malacostraca
- Order: Decapoda
- Suborder: Pleocyemata
- Infraorder: Caridea
- Family: Palaemonidae
- Genus: Palaemon
- Species: P. vicinus

Binomial name
- Palaemon vicinus Ashelby, 2009

Species of crustacean

Palaemon vicinus is a species of shrimp of the family Palaemonidae.
