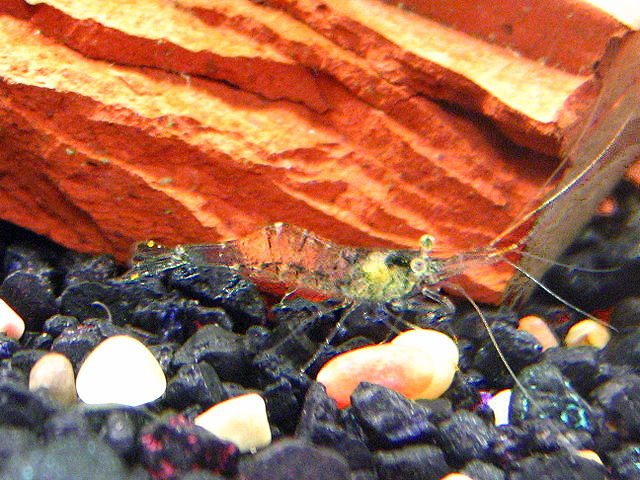
- In a freshwater aquarium

Scientific classification
- Kingdom: Animalia
- Phylum: Arthropoda
- Clade: Pancrustacea
- Class: Malacostraca
- Order: Decapoda
- Suborder: Pleocyemata
- Infraorder: Caridea
- Family: Palaemonidae
- Genus: Palaemonetes
- Species: P. paludosus

Binomial name
- Palaemonetes paludosus (Gibbes, 1850)

Synonyms
- List: Hippolyte caroliniana Gibbes, 1848; Hippolyte paludosa Gibbes, 1850; Palaemonetes exilipes Stimpson, 1871; Palaemonetes paludosus (Gibbes, 1850)

= Palaemon paludosus =

Species of crustacean

Palaemonetes paludosus, commonly known as ghost shrimp, glass shrimp, and eastern grass shrimp, is a species of freshwater shrimp from the southeastern United States. They can be considered a keystone species based on the services they provide to their habitat. They are also popular in the domestic aquarium business.

== Description ==
Palaemon paludosus is up to 2.5 cm (1.0 in) long and largely transparent. By manipulating the pigment granules in its body, it can produce effective camouflage against its background. It is very similar to P. kadiakensis, from which it can be distinguished by the arrangement of spines on the telson.

== Distribution ==
Palaemon paludosus is common in southern states east of the Appalachian Mountains. It is also found in Louisiana, where it may not be native, and there are scattered records from further west, in Texas and California. Their distribution is due to decreased susceptibility to predation because of complexity in higher habitats in Polygonum beds.

== Ecology ==
Palaemon paludosus lives in fresh water or slightly brackish water, usually in lakes. It is nocturnal, remaining hidden among the vegetation by day, and emerging at night to feed on plankton. It is an important prey item for a number of birds and fishes, such as black bass, and may be considered a keystone species. They reproduce sexually and will die after the spawning season is complete. They are also used as host by a parasitic isopod, Probopyrus pandalicola, that makes the female shrimps sterile and affects the growth of the male's sex characteristics.

Palaemon paludosus reproduces sexually, having gendered individuals. They are a polygynous species, meaning the males will mate with more than one female. There are typically more females than males in wild populations with 0.78 males for every female. Reproduction is the completion of their life cycle with individuals dying after spawning season is complete. Breeding seasons varies depending on the temperature of the water. A female shrimp is able to lay up to 85 eggs per clutch.

== Diet and behavior ==
Palaemon paludosus are omnivores that mainly consume algae and aquatic insects along with various species of diatoms such as Fragilaria and Nivicula. They do most of their feeding at night as they are nocturnal.

== Economics ==
Palaemon paludosus is a common aquarium pet due to their unique appearance. They are recommended for those just starting their aquariums since they are relatively easy to take care of and will keep the tank algae free. Along with eating algae they will eat whatever has been fed to the animals kept in the tank as well. For the shrimp's sake it is recommended to keep a group of them, a group of up to 20 individuals can be healthy fit in a 5-gallon tank. Although the ideal ratio of shrimp to tank size in gallons is about 3 shrimps per gallon.
