= Palaemon yuna =

Scientific classification
- Kingdom: Animalia
- Phylum: Arthropoda
- Clade: Pancrustacea
- Class: Malacostraca
- Order: Decapoda
- Suborder: Pleocyemata
- Infraorder: Caridea
- Family: Palaemonidae
- Genus: Palaemon
- Species: P. yuna

Binomial name
- Palaemon yuna Magalhães & Mantelatto, 2014

Species of crustacean

Palaemon yuna is a species of shrimp in the family Palaemonidae.
