= Palaemon ortmanni =

Scientific classification
- Kingdom: Animalia
- Phylum: Arthropoda
- Clade: Pancrustacea
- Class: Malacostraca
- Order: Decapoda
- Suborder: Pleocyemata
- Infraorder: Caridea
- Family: Palaemonidae
- Genus: Palaemon
- Species: P. ortmanni

Binomial name
- Palaemon ortmanni Rathbun, 1902

Species of crustacean

Palaemon ortmanni is a species of shrimp of the family Palaemonidae. The species has been found in China, Japan, and Taiwan.
