= Palaemon intermedius =

Scientific classification
- Kingdom: Animalia
- Phylum: Arthropoda
- Clade: Pancrustacea
- Class: Malacostraca
- Order: Decapoda
- Suborder: Pleocyemata
- Infraorder: Caridea
- Family: Palaemonidae
- Genus: Palaemon
- Species: P. intermedius

Binomial name
- Palaemon intermedius Stimpson, 1860

Synonyms
- Leander intermedius Stimpson, 1860; Macrobrachium intermedium (Stimpson, 1860)

Species of crustacean

Palaemon intermedius is a species of shrimp of the family Palaemonidae. It is endemic to temperate waters around southeastern Australia. The shrimp is translucent, with red spots and narrow stripes.
