= Palaemon maculatus =

Scientific classification
- Kingdom: Animalia
- Phylum: Arthropoda
- Clade: Pancrustacea
- Class: Malacostraca
- Order: Decapoda
- Suborder: Pleocyemata
- Infraorder: Caridea
- Family: Palaemonidae
- Genus: Palaemon
- Species: P. maculatus

Binomial name
- Palaemon maculatus (Thallwitz, 1891)

Species of crustacean

Palaemon maculatus is a species of shrimp of the family Palaemonidae. The species can be found in the Niger Delta and is of commercial importance.
