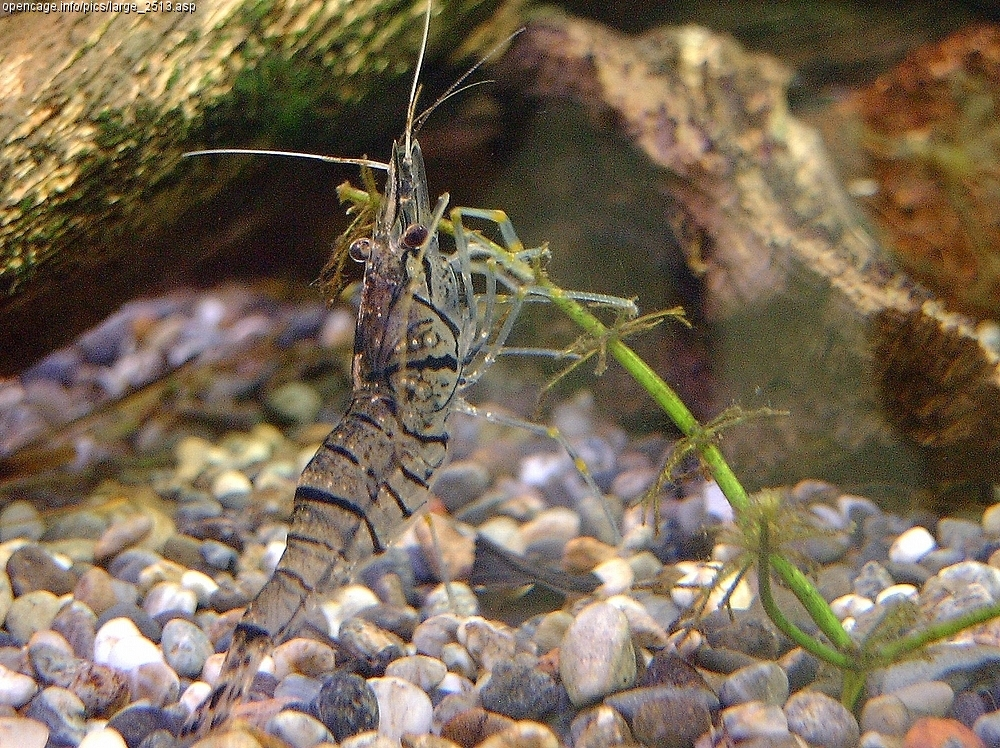

Scientific classification
- Kingdom: Animalia
- Phylum: Arthropoda
- Clade: Pancrustacea
- Class: Malacostraca
- Order: Decapoda
- Suborder: Pleocyemata
- Infraorder: Caridea
- Family: Palaemonidae
- Genus: Palaemon
- Species: P. paucidens

Binomial name
- Palaemon paucidens de Haan, 1844

= Palaemon paucidens =

Species of crustacean

Palaemon paucidens is a species of shrimp of the family Palaemonidae. It is found in rivers on the Korean Peninsula and in Japan.
