= Palaemon powelli =

Scientific classification
- Kingdom: Animalia
- Phylum: Arthropoda
- Clade: Pancrustacea
- Class: Malacostraca
- Order: Decapoda
- Suborder: Pleocyemata
- Infraorder: Caridea
- Family: Palaemonidae
- Genus: Palaemon
- Species: P. powelli

Binomial name
- Palaemon powelli Ashelby & De Grave, 2009

Species of crustacean

Palaemon powelli is a species of shrimp of the family Palaemonidae. It was discovered in the Atlantic Ocean near West Africa.
