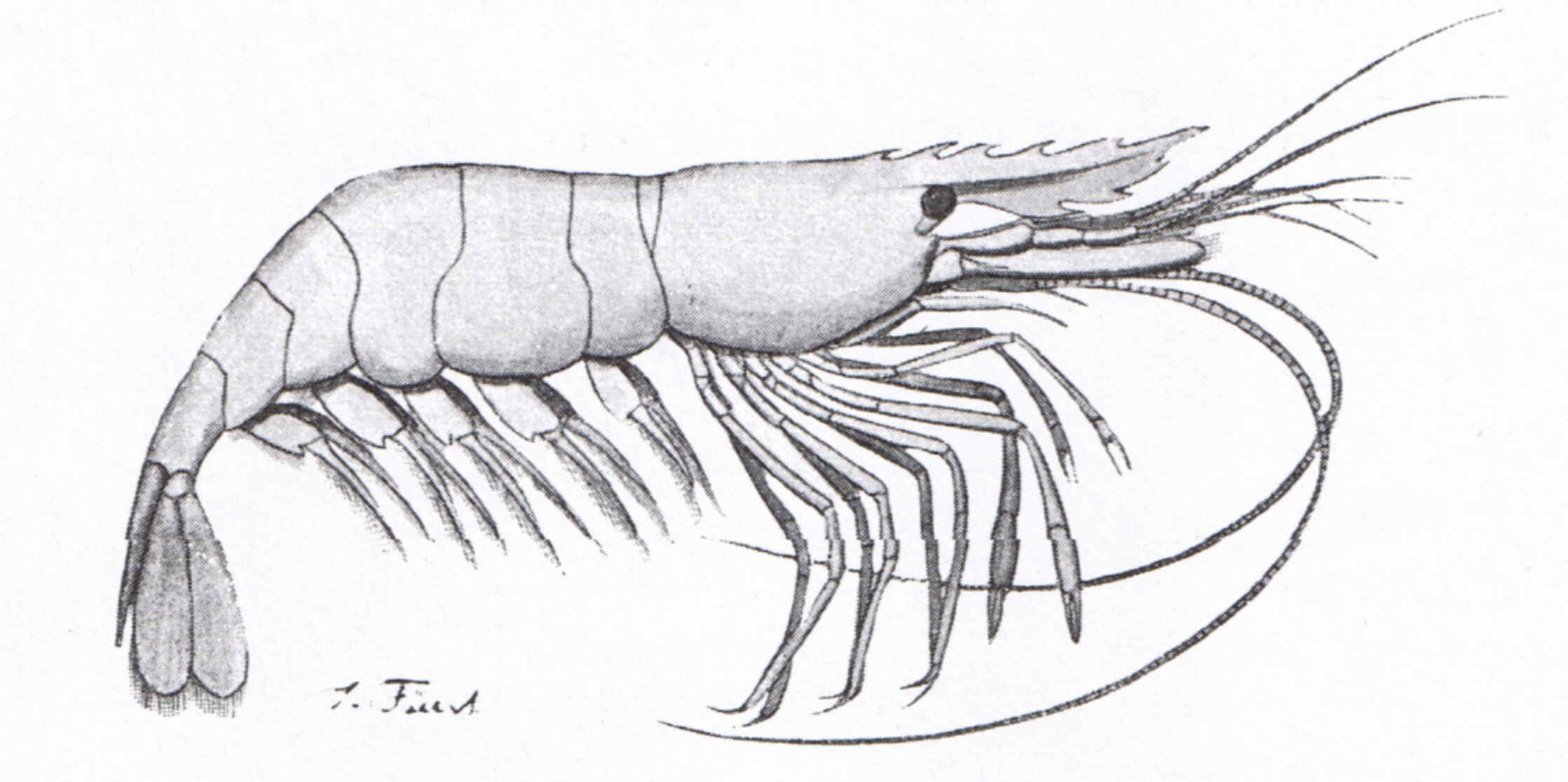

Scientific classification
- Kingdom: Animalia
- Phylum: Arthropoda
- Clade: Pancrustacea
- Class: Malacostraca
- Order: Decapoda
- Suborder: Pleocyemata
- Infraorder: Caridea
- Family: Palaemonidae
- Genus: Palaemon
- Species: P. adspersus

Binomial name
- Palaemon adspersus Rathke, 1837

Synonyms
- Cancer squilla Linnaeus, 1758; Leander brandti Czerniavsky, 1884; Leander rectirostris transitans Czerniavsky, 1884; Leander rectirostris tyicia Czerniavsky, 1884; Palaemon brandti (Czerniavsky, 1884); Palaemon communis Anslijn, 1826; Palaemon fabricii Rathke, 1843; Palaemon imbellis Fischer, 1872; Palaemon leachii Bell, 1851; Palaemon rectirostris Zaddack, 1944; Palaemon rectirostris octodentatus Neumann, 1878

= Palaemon adspersus =

Species of shrimp

Palaemon adspersus, commonly called Baltic prawn, is a species of shrimp that is frequent in the Baltic Sea, and is the subject of fisheries in Denmark. It is up to 70 mm (2.8 in) long, and lives in Zostera beds.

== Description ==
Palaemon adspersus is up to 70 millimetres (2.8 in) long, with a plain yellowish-grey body. The rostrum bears distinctive spots of pigment on its lower half.

== Distribution and ecology ==
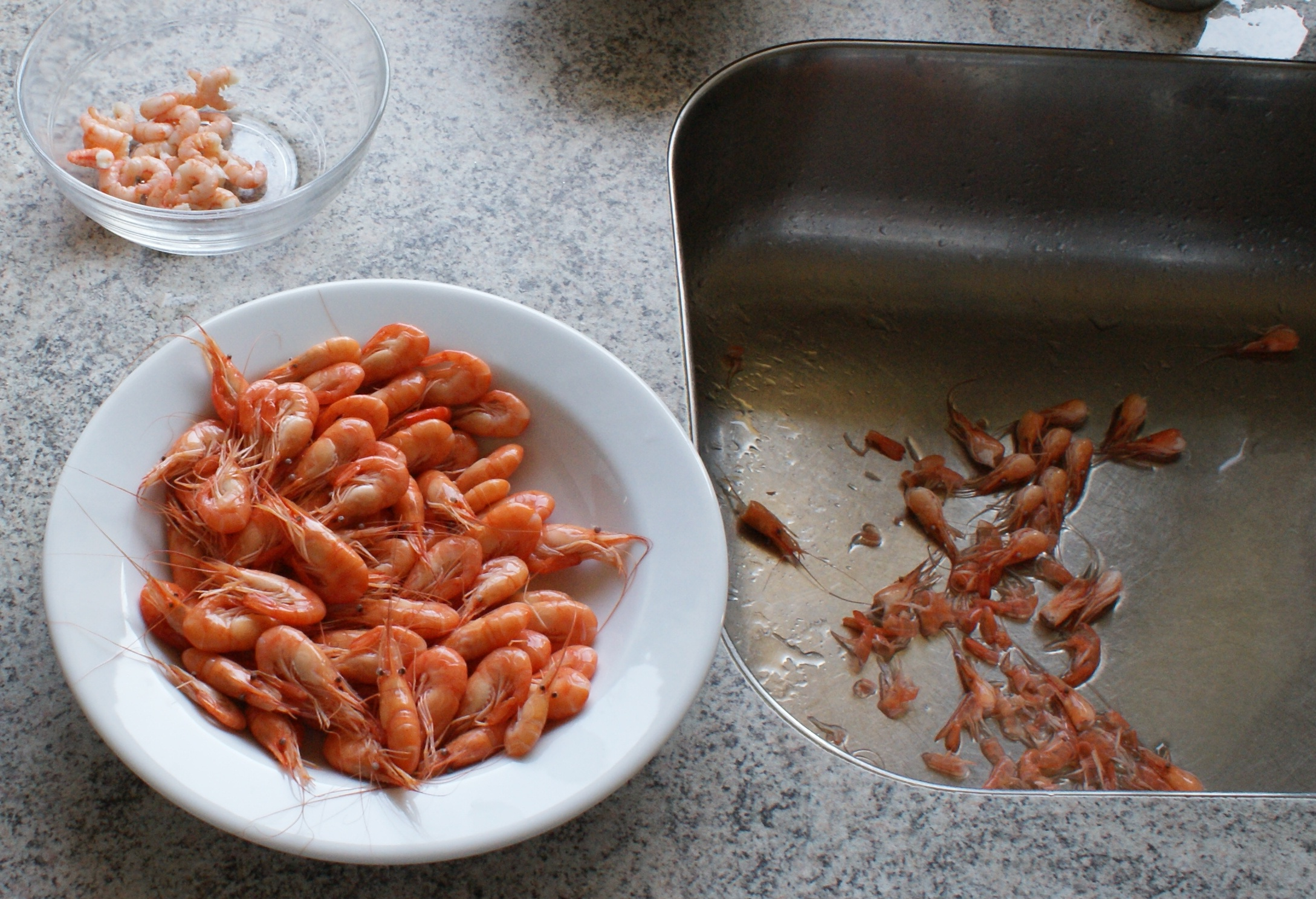
Palaemon adspersus being peeled

Palaemon adspersus is uncommon over most of north-western Europe, but forms the basis of a significant fishery in the Danish Straits. In the Baltic Sea, it can tolerate salinities as low as 5‰, but it overwinters in deeper, more saline waters offshore. In Denmark, P. adspersus is closely associated with Zostera (eelgrass) beds, and is replaced by Palaemon elegans where the eelgrass is lacking.

== Taxonomic history ==
Carl Linnaeus described this species under the name Cancer squilla in his Systema Naturae (1758, 1761). As more genera were split from Linnaeus' Cancer, this species became known as Leander squilla, while the genus Palaemon was used for other species. In 1897, Mary Jane Rathbun realised that a type species for the genus Palaemon had been made in 1810 by Pierre André Latreille, and that the chosen species was Cancer squilla. This required the genus then known as Leander to become Palaemon, while the genus then known as Palaemon had to become Macrobrachium. Not all biologists followed the new nomenclature, and the confusion was eventually resolved by a ruling from the International Commission on Zoological Nomenclature (ICZN), which stated that the type species of Palaemon would be Palaemon adspersus.

In 1958, Lipke Holthuis petitioned the ICZN to suppress the Linnaean name Cancer squilla because it had come to be used for the species Palaemon elegans even though the original description was of a different species. Despite opposition from some carcinologists, including Robert Gurney, the ICZN concurred, leaving Palaemon adspersus Rathke, 1837 the oldest available name for the species.
