= Palaemon paivai =

Scientific classification
- Kingdom: Animalia
- Phylum: Arthropoda
- Clade: Pancrustacea
- Class: Malacostraca
- Order: Decapoda
- Suborder: Pleocyemata
- Infraorder: Caridea
- Family: Palaemonidae
- Genus: Palaemon
- Species: P. paivai

Binomial name
- Palaemon paivai Filho, 1967

Species of crustacean

Palaemon paivai is a species of shrimp of the family Palaemonidae. It is endemic to the state of Ceará, Brazil.
