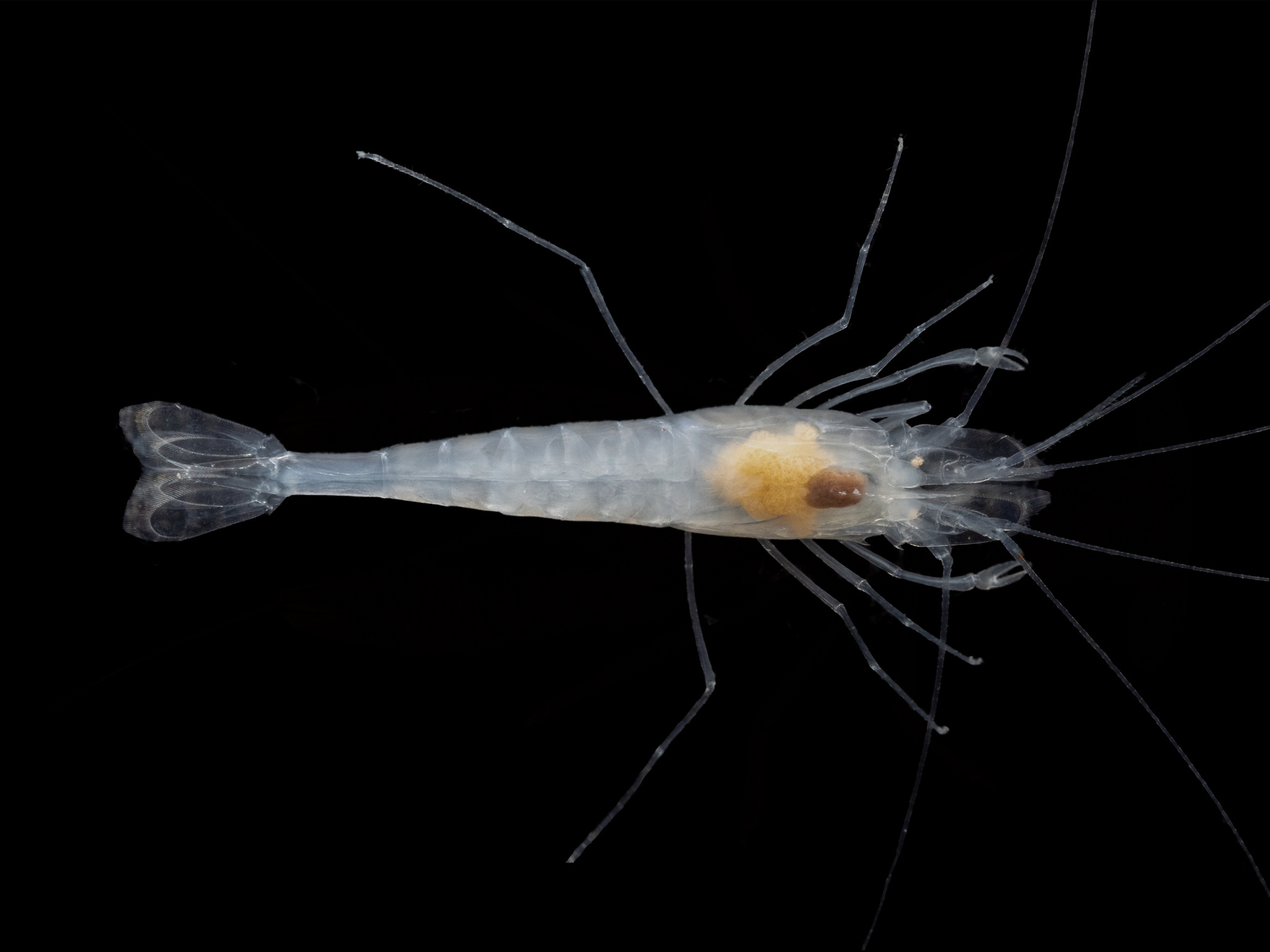

Conservation status
- Endangered (IUCN 3.1)

Scientific classification
- Kingdom: Animalia
- Phylum: Arthropoda
- Clade: Pancrustacea
- Class: Malacostraca
- Order: Decapoda
- Suborder: Pleocyemata
- Infraorder: Caridea
- Family: Palaemonidae
- Genus: Palaemon
- Species: P. antrorum

Binomial name
- Palaemon antrorum (J. E. Benedict, 1896)

Synonyms
- Palaemonetes antrorum J.E. Benedict, 1896

= Palaemon antrorum =

Species of crustacean

Palaemon antrorum, also known as the Balcones cave shrimp and the Texas cave shrimp, is a species of palaemonid shrimp endemic to Texas. It is listed as an endangered species on the IUCN Red List, and as a Species of Concern by the United States Endangered Species Act.

The species' type locality is an artesian well on what is now the campus of Texas State University–San Marcos in San Marcos, Texas. It has also been reported from Edwards Aquifer west to Uvalde County.

== See also ==
- Balcones Canyonlands National Wildlife Refuge
- Edwards Plateau
