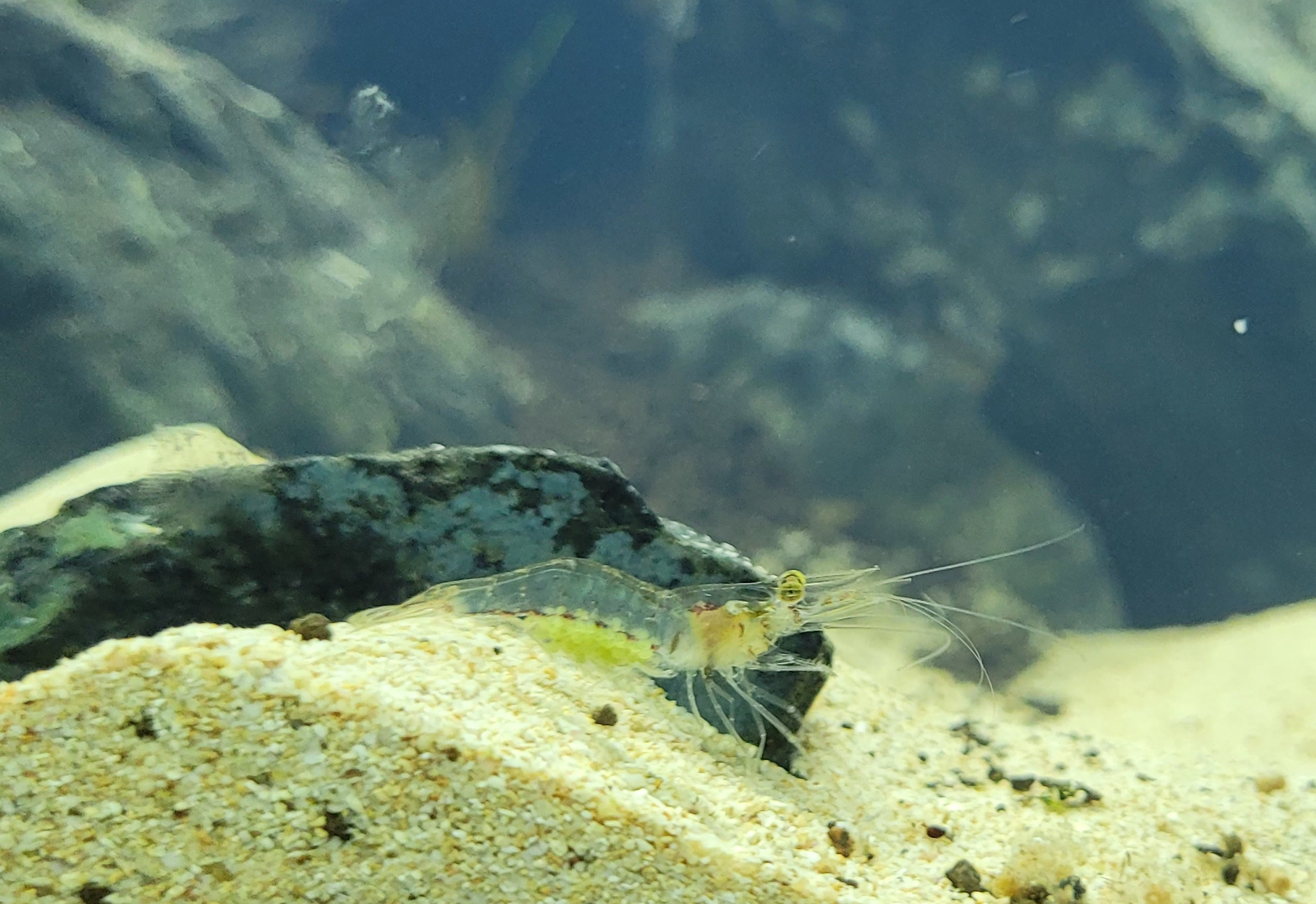
- Palaemon concinnus female with eggs from the Pulangi River, Mindanao, Philippines

Scientific classification
- Kingdom: Animalia
- Phylum: Arthropoda
- Clade: Pancrustacea
- Class: Malacostraca
- Order: Decapoda
- Suborder: Pleocyemata
- Infraorder: Caridea
- Family: Palaemonidae
- Genus: Palaemon
- Species: P. concinnus

Binomial name
- Palaemon concinnus Dana, 1852

= Palaemon concinnus =

Species of crustacean

Palaemon concinnus, the mangrove prawn, is a species of shrimp of the family Palaemonidae. Palaemon concinnus is found throughout the Pacific Ocean and Mozambique.
