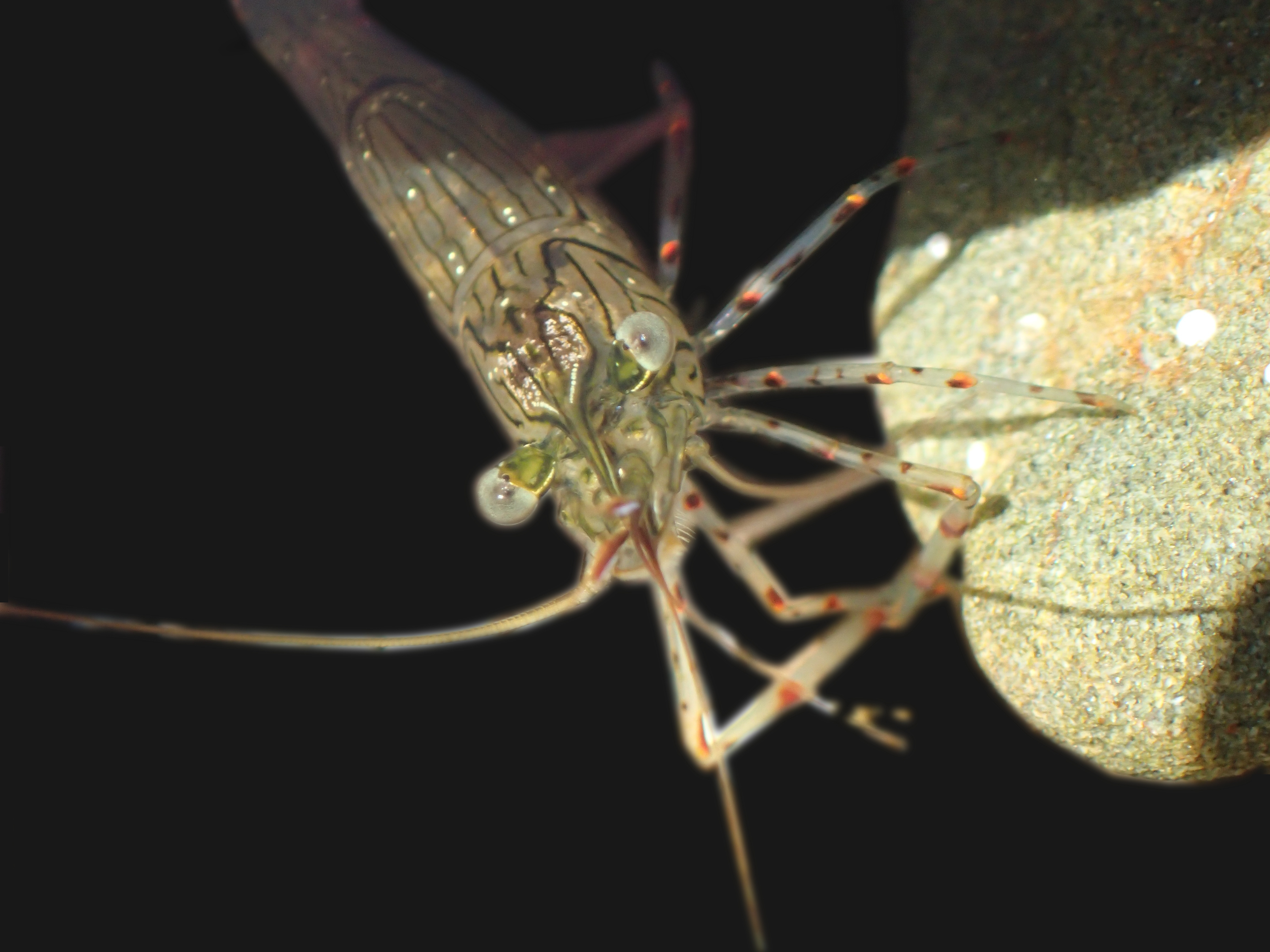

Scientific classification
- Kingdom: Animalia
- Phylum: Arthropoda
- Clade: Pancrustacea
- Class: Malacostraca
- Order: Decapoda
- Suborder: Pleocyemata
- Infraorder: Caridea
- Family: Palaemonidae
- Genus: Palaemon
- Species: P. affinis

Binomial name
- Palaemon affinis H. Milne-Edwards, 1837

Synonyms
- Palemon affinis H. Milne-Edwards, 1837; Palemon quoianus H. Milne-Edwards, 1837

= Palaemon affinis =

Species of crustacean

Palaemon affinis, also known as the tide-pool shrimp or glass shrimp, is a species of shrimp of the family Palaemonidae. It is endemic to the waters of New Zealand.

== Taxonomy ==
Palaemon affinis was first described in 1837 by Henri Milne-Edwards as Palaemon affinis and Palaemon quoianus. In 1876, P. affinis was placed in the Leander subgenus (which is a subgenus of Palaemon). In 1954, P. affinis was moved to the Palaemon subgenus and P. quoianus was recognized as a synonym for P. affinis. Early authors used the name Palaemon affinis for specimens now considered to belong to a variety of other species.

== Description ==
P. affinis is a prawn-like species with a transparent body. The average male's carapace length is about 6.1 mm with a total body length of 15-36 mm, and the female’s carapace length is about 13.3 mm and total body length ranging from 5-57.2 mm. The body is striped, often in red and green, with orange-black dots along tail and legs. This appearance provides camouflage in rocky pool environments. The rostrum has a sharp, saw-like pattern useful in foraging and defense. The rostrum is usually longer than the carapace. It is an important feature for distinguishing between Palaemon species. Like other species in the genus, P. affinis usually has approximately six body segments. There are both chelate (pincered) and non-chelate legs. In females carrying eggs, chelate legs are used to clean the eggs and promote water flow around them.

== Distribution and habitat ==
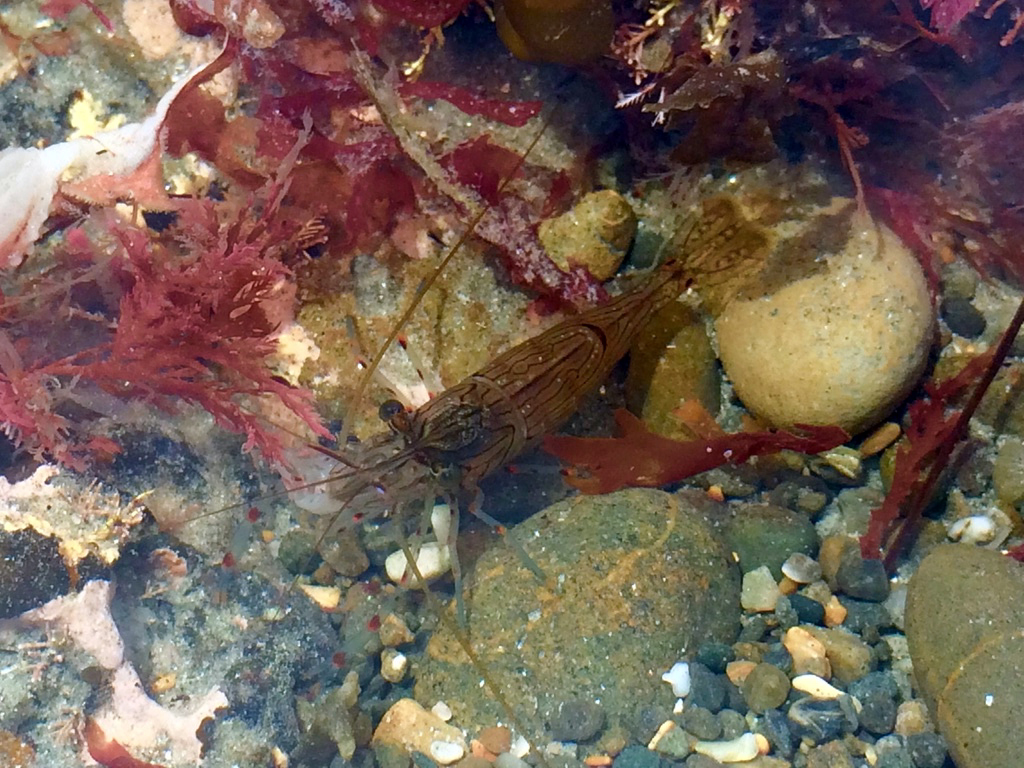
Specimen near the mouth of the Motunau River

P. affinis constitutes the most common type of prawn in the intertidal zone in the North and South Islands of New Zealand. They can be found at depths of up to 300 m at water temperatues of 16°-20°C. Although previously thought to be present in many other countries, the species is now considered to occur in New Zealand only. However, it has been suggested that some specimens from the subantarctic islands and Australia may also be Palaemon affinis.

P. affinis occurs along shores in rocky intertidal zones and in estuaries. The shrimp is very tolerant of salinity changes and can survive in water with a salinity of 5-43%. At McCormacks Bay in Canterbury it was found to be most abundant during high tide, at night, and during the summer months, with abundance fluctuating throughout the year and tidal periods.

== Ecology ==
=== Diet ===
The species is mostly carnivorous. Based on examination of stomach contents, they appear to primarily feed upon amphipods, but may also eat polychaetes, gastropods, and bivalves. Depending on food availability, plant materials may also be taken. Diet choice does not differ by sex, however the smaller males consume less than the larger females. No seasonal diet choices have been reported. Individuals prefer to feed at night and tend to keep their stomachs at around 50% fullness throughout the daytime.

=== Reproduction ===
Females reach maturity onset at a total body length of 33-41 mm, during the late spring to early summer. P. affinis reproductive strategies differ from that of other Palaemon species, which generally carry a number of eggs relative to their body size (up to 2,750 eggs per breeding cycle). In contrast, in P. affinis egg number is dependent on each female's individual fertility (110-690 eggs per breeding cycle. Eggs are carried via pleopods under the abdomen until hatching, for 2 to 3 weeks, and are constantly fanned and cleaned to prevent fungal growth. Hatched larvae are planktonic and go through several rounds of moulting. Juveniles begin to settle down on rock beds after their limbs are developed.

The species can display sequential hermaphroditism, switching back and forth between female and male forms. Females can become male when they reach a carapace length of 12-13 mm and can change back to female at a carapace length of 16 mm.

=== Molting ===
Molting progress is dependent on age and environment. Molting frequency can change greatly based on the temperature, food availability, and other environmental parameters. Molting happens very frequently during the juvenile period, up to 2 to 4 times per week. During reproductive periods, female molting a mating sign for males.

=== Predators ===
The species' main predators are fish, larger shrimps, crabs, and other crustaceans. As P. affinis are most vulnerable after they molt, they tend to hide under rocks to protect themselves during this period, especially during mating season.

Because P. affinis uses fucoid seaweed to evade predation, population density is linked to algae presence, resulting in up to 3-fold increased density in algae-rich habitat. Suitable seaweed species are identified by olfactory cues. The species shows preference towards specific microhabitats in tide pools based on the predation risk in the surrounding environment. While its choice may vary when the risk is low, it moves to areas with high algal cover under high-risk conditions. Other potential benefits associated with this habitat include a good source of prey, more encounters with conspecifics, heterogeneous thermal environment for better body temperature regulation, and higher oxygen content.

=== Social behavior ===
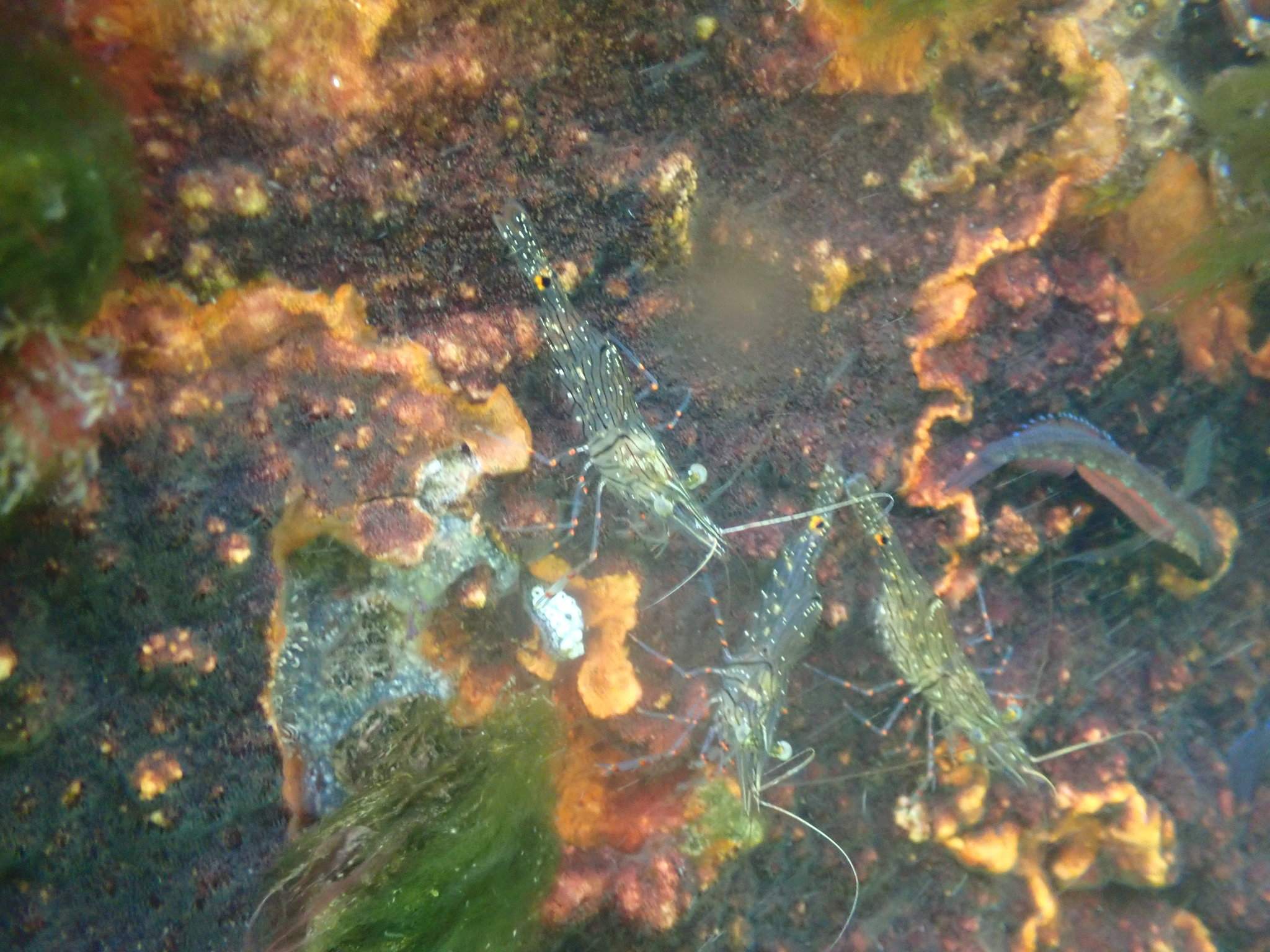
Group in Northland

Individuals are mostly solitary solitary or in loose aggregations. They tend to live close proximity to others in rocky areas. Egg-carrying females they tend to observe a small territorial area to protect themselves against predators. The species has a low level of aggression and often uses defensive mechanisms such as pushing or claw flicking rather than engaging in fights. Chemical cues are used to communicate about predator presence or other dangers.

== Sensory system ==
Similar to other decapod crustaceans, P. affinis can sense the presence of amino acids and nucleotides in the water using chemoreceptors, which play an important role in predator avoidance, habitat searching, and conspecific finding. Its reliance on chemoreception may be due to the limited visibility in the structurally complex substrates and turbidity of tide pool habitats. Individuals respond evasively to chemical cues produced directly by predators or indirectly associated with predation events, such as digestion products or injured conspecifics. The species is able to distinguish between conspecific and heterospecific chemical cues, which may increase mating success. This species also alters behaviors when different plant chemical cues are present to choose suitable habitats; it is attracted to intertidal-dwelling plants, while avoiding or not showing any response to coastal plants that don’t normally occur below the high tide mark.

== As pets ==
P. affinis are sometimes used as aquarium pets, especially in Australia. They can be bred in aquaria and usually require a tank of ~50 l in volume.
