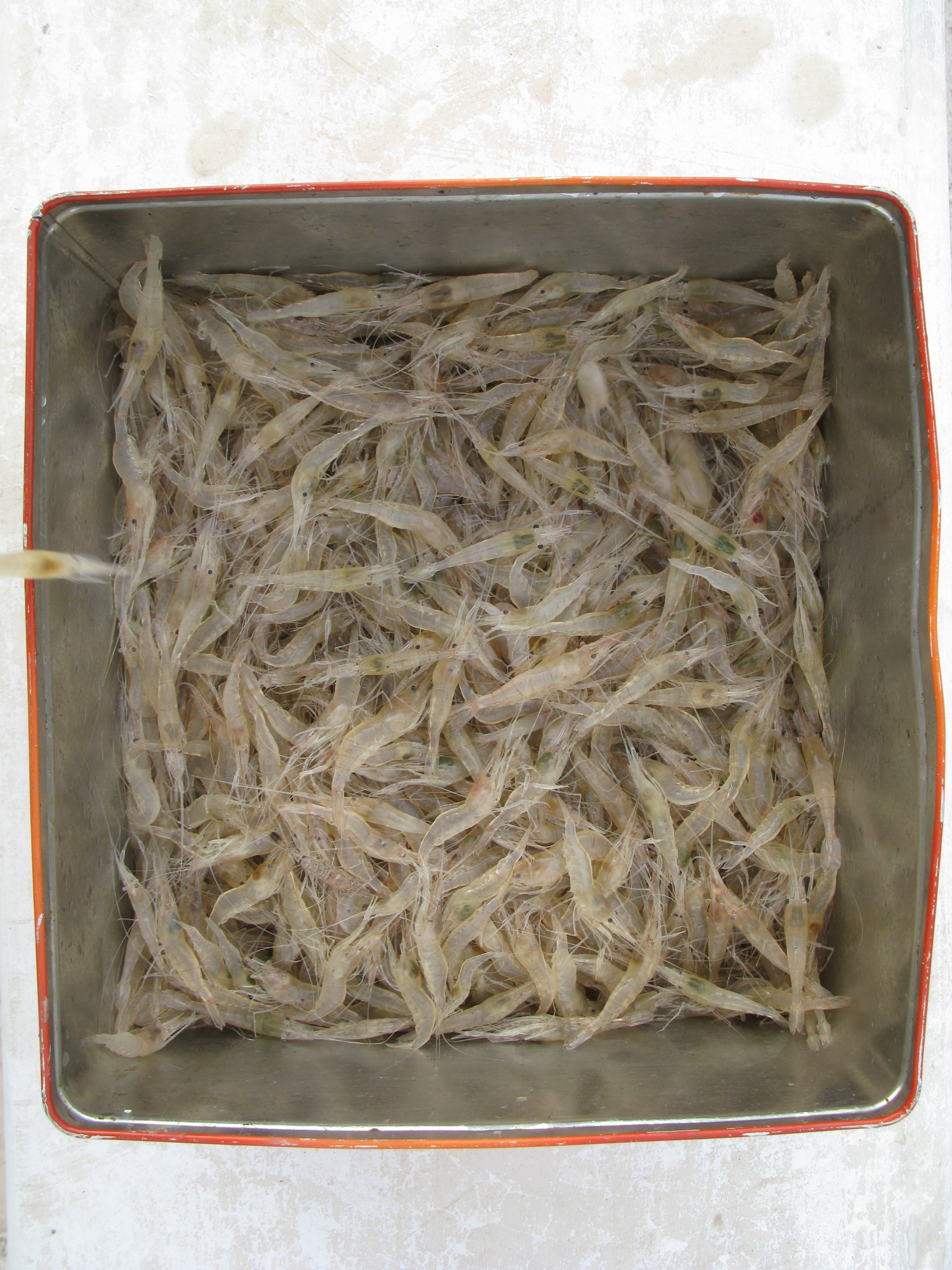

Scientific classification
- Kingdom: Animalia
- Phylum: Arthropoda
- Clade: Pancrustacea
- Class: Malacostraca
- Order: Decapoda
- Suborder: Pleocyemata
- Infraorder: Caridea
- Family: Palaemonidae
- Genus: Palaemon
- Species: P. longirostris

Binomial name
- Palaemon longirostris H. Milne Edwards, 1837

= Palaemon longirostris =

Species of crustacean

Palaemon longirostris is a species of shrimp of the family Palaemonidae. It is considered an invasive species in the Black Sea.
