= Palaemon northropi =

Scientific classification
- Kingdom: Animalia
- Phylum: Arthropoda
- Clade: Pancrustacea
- Class: Malacostraca
- Order: Decapoda
- Suborder: Pleocyemata
- Infraorder: Caridea
- Family: Palaemonidae
- Genus: Palaemon
- Species: P. northropi

Binomial name
- Palaemon northropi Walter Mead Rankin, 1898

Species of crustacean

Palaemon northropi is a species of shrimp of the family Palaemonidae.
