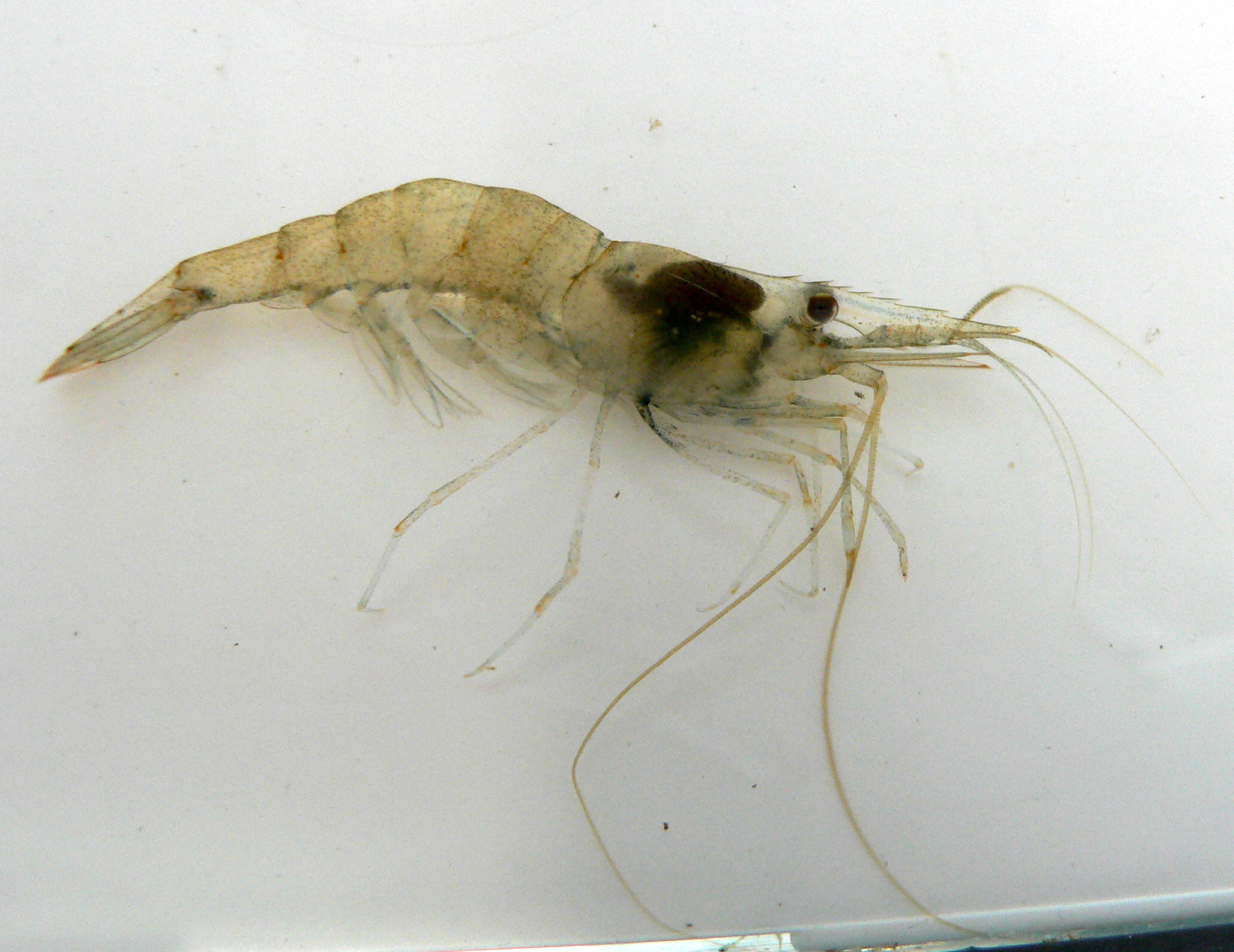

Scientific classification
- Kingdom: Animalia
- Phylum: Arthropoda
- Class: Malacostraca
- Order: Decapoda
- Suborder: Pleocyemata
- Infraorder: Caridea
- Family: Palaemonidae
- Genus: Palaemon
- Species: P. varians

Binomial name
- Palaemon varians Leach, 1814

Synonyms
- Palaemon variabilis Bouchard-Chanteraux, 1829; Palaemonetes varians (Leach, 1814)

= Palaemon varians =

Species of crustacean

Palaemon varians, known as the Atlantic ditch shrimp and variable shrimp, is a caridean shrimp found from the Baltic Sea and the British Isles to the western Mediterranean Sea. It reaches up to 5 cm (2.0 in) in length and is never found in fully marine conditions, instead living in brackish water.

== In the aquarium ==
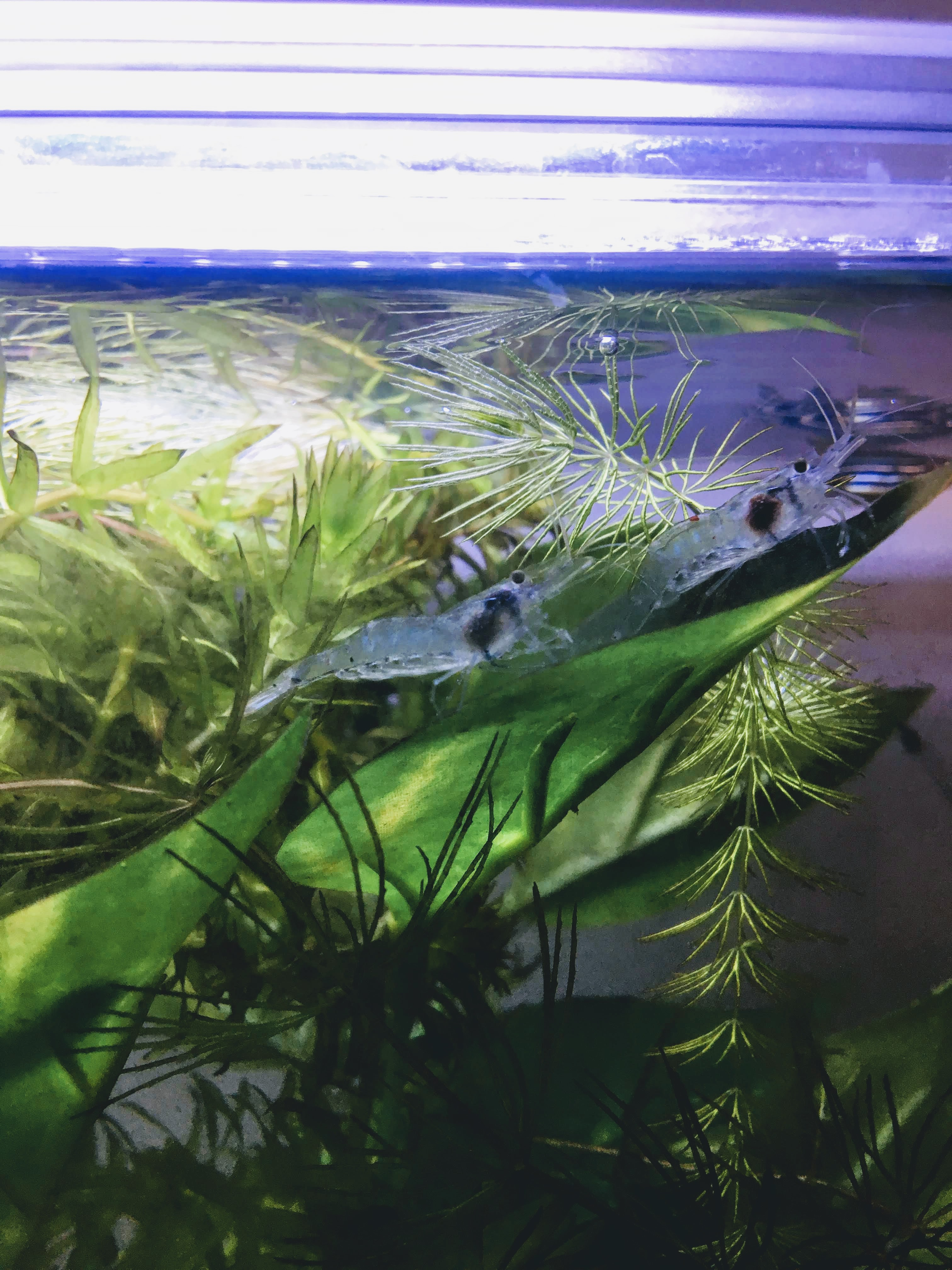
Palaemon varians in a temperate freshwater aquarium

Sold by aquarium retailers as grass shrimp, they have a high tolerance of varying salinity and temperature levels ranging from 1 °C to 30 °C for prolonged periods of time. They will feed on any leftover fish food, algae or plant life and are generally peaceful by nature when mixed with similar sized aquarium life.
