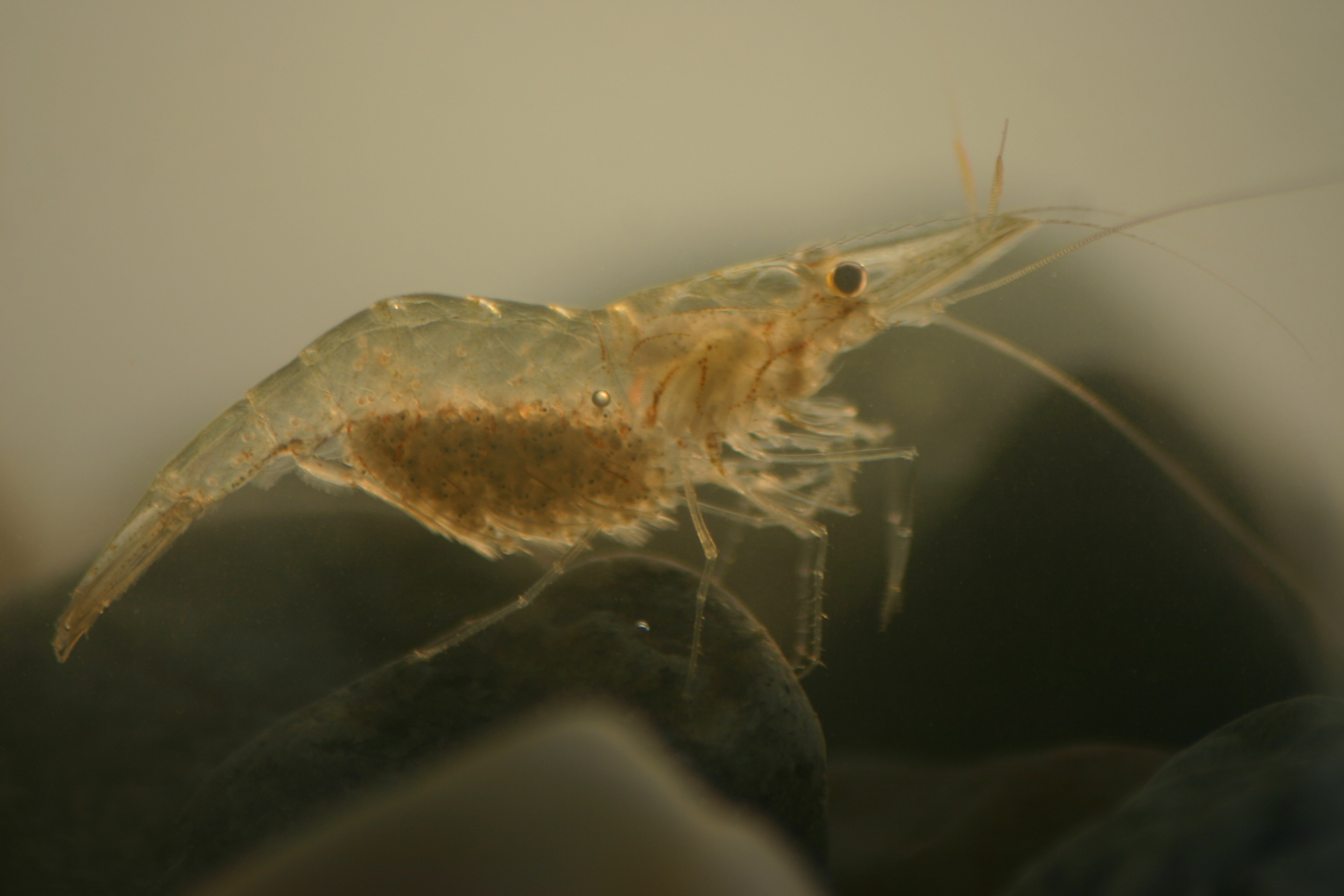

Scientific classification
- Kingdom: Animalia
- Phylum: Arthropoda
- Clade: Pancrustacea
- Class: Malacostraca
- Order: Decapoda
- Suborder: Pleocyemata
- Infraorder: Caridea
- Family: Palaemonidae
- Genus: Palaemon
- Species: P. pugio

Binomial name
- Palaemon pugio (Holthuis, 1949)

Synonyms
- Palaemonetes pugio Holthuis, 1949

= Palaemon pugio =

Species of crustacean

Palaemon pugio, commonly known as daggerblade grass shrimp, is a small, transparent species of shrimp with yellow coloring and brownish spots. It can be found in estuarine and tidal marsh habitats throughout the western Atlantic Ocean and Gulf of Mexico. Palaemon pugio has a smooth carapace and abdomen, as well as three pairs of legs. The second pair is the strongest, while the third pair lacks chelae (claws). It reaches a length of around 5 cm (2.0 in), and has a life span of around one year. Like most grass shrimp, it is a forager and feeds on a variety of items, including microalgae. They themselves are consumed by killifish and other small foraging fish.
