= Palaemon carteri =

Scientific classification
- Kingdom: Animalia
- Phylum: Arthropoda
- Clade: Pancrustacea
- Class: Malacostraca
- Order: Decapoda
- Suborder: Pleocyemata
- Infraorder: Caridea
- Family: Palaemonidae
- Genus: Palaemon
- Species: P. carteri

Binomial name
- Palaemon carteri Holthius, 1950

Species of Malacostraca

Palaemon carteri is a species of shrimp of the family Palaemonidae. It is endemic to the Amazon Jungle. It is one of the most common shrimp of the Amazon.
