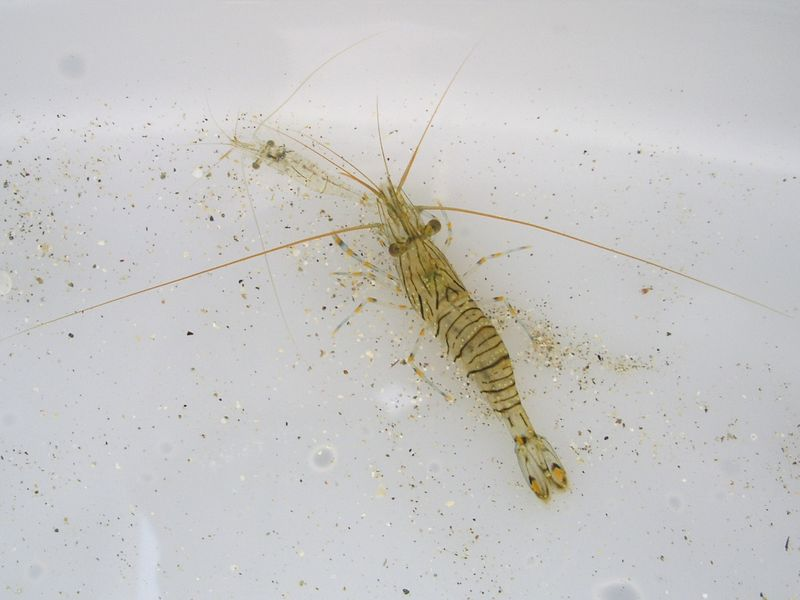
- Palaemon pacificus
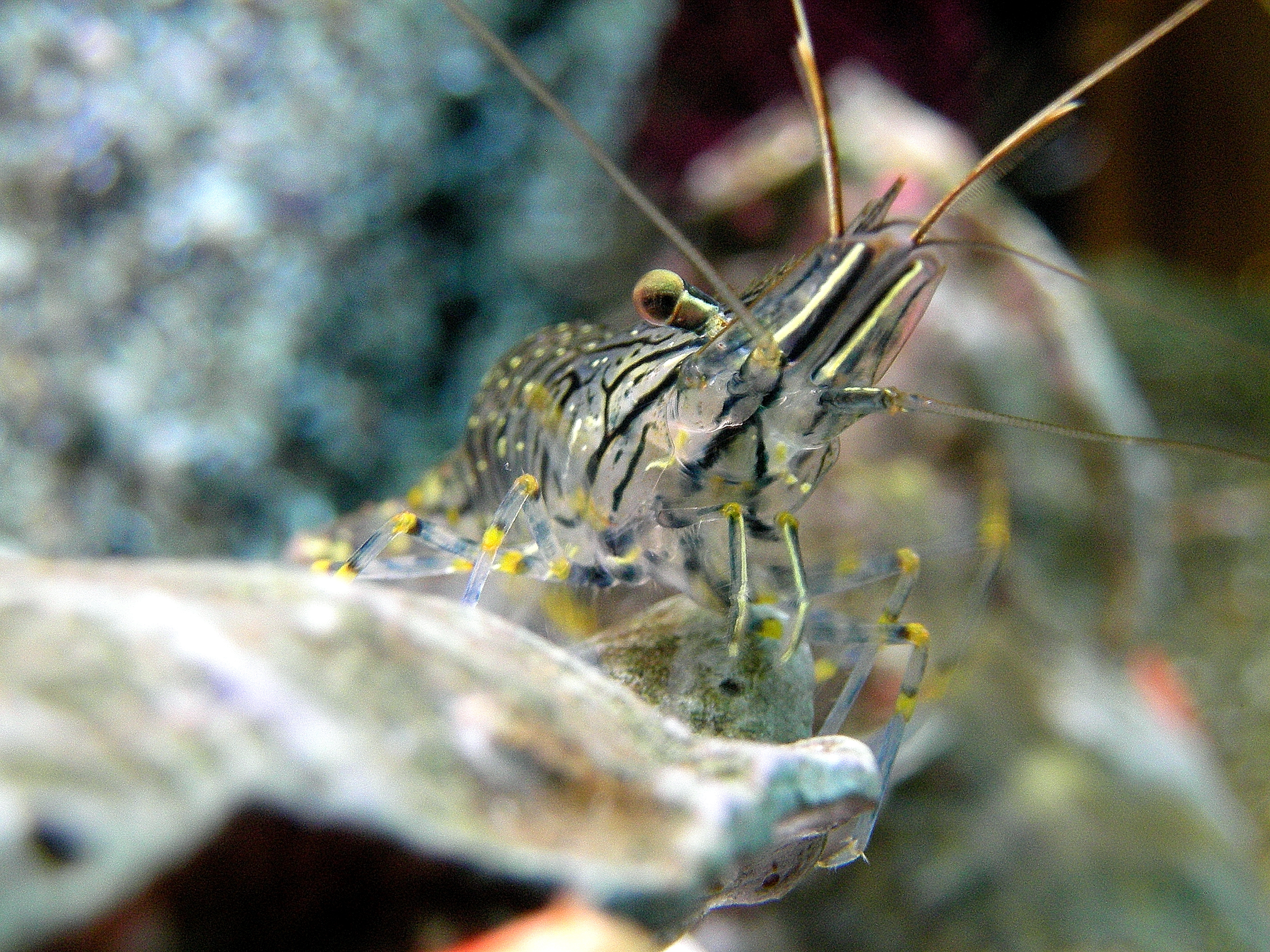
- Palaemon elegans

Scientific classification
- Kingdom: Animalia
- Phylum: Arthropoda
- Clade: Pancrustacea
- Class: Malacostraca
- Order: Decapoda
- Suborder: Pleocyemata
- Infraorder: Caridea
- Family: Palaemonidae
- Genus: Palaemon; Weber, 1795

Type species
- Palaemon adspersus Rathke, 1837

Synonyms
- List: Palaemon Fabricius, 1798 (Preocc.); Palemon Duméril, 1805 (Missp.); Palaemonetes Heller, 1869; Palaemonopsis Stimpson, 1871; Allocaris Sollaud, 1911; Coutierella Sollaud, 1914; Alaocaris Holthuis, 1949; Exopalaemon Holthuis, 1950; Palaeander Holthuis, 1950

= Palaemon (crustacean) =

Genus of crustaceans

Palaemon is a genus of caridean shrimp in the family Palaemonidae.

Some species, including Palaemon macrodactylus and Palaemon orientis, can inhabit fish ponds where they compete with fish for food and can therefore be considered pests.

== Species ==
The following species are recognised in the genus Palaemon:

- Palaemon adspersus Rathke, 1836
- Palaemon affinis H. Milne Edwards, 1837
- Palaemon africanus (Balss, 1916)
- Palaemon annandalei (Kemp, 1917)
- Palaemon antennarius H. Milne Edwards, 1837
- †Palaemon antonellae Garassino & Bravi, 2003
- Palaemon antrorum (Benedict, 1896)
- Palaemon argentinus (Nobili, 1901)
- Palaemon atrinubes (Bray, 1976)
- Palaemon audouini Heller, 1861
- Palaemon australis (Dakin, 1915)
- Palaemon camranhi (Nguyên, 1997)
- Palaemon capensis (De Man in Weber, 1897)
- Palaemon carinicauda Holthuis, 1950
- Palaemon carteri (Gordon, 1935)
- Palaemon colossus Tzomos & Koukouras, 2015
- Palaemon concinnus Dana, 1852
- Palaemon cummingi (Chace, 1954)
- Palaemon curvirostris Nguyên, 1992
- Palaemon debilis Dana, 1852
- Palaemon dolospinus Walker & Poore, 2003
- Palaemon elegans Rathke, 1836
- †Palaemon exul Frič, 1872
- Palaemon floridanus Chace, 1942
- Palaemon gladiator Holthuis, 1950
- Palaemon gracilis (Smith, 1871)
- Palaemon gravieri (Yu, 1930)
- Palaemon guangdongensis Liu, Liang & Yan, 1990
- Palaemon hainanensis (Liang, 2000)
- Palaemon hancocki Holthuis, 1950
- Palaemon hiltoni (Schmitt, 1921)
- Palaemon hobbsi (Strenth, 1994)
- Palaemon intermedius (Stimpson, 1860)
- Palaemon ivonicus (Holthuis, 1950)
- Palaemon kadiakensis (Rathbun, 1902)
- Palaemon khori De Grave & Al-Maslamani, 2006
- Palaemon kwangtung De Grave & Ashelby, 2013
- Palaemon leucurus Ashelby, De Grave & Nguyen, 2018
- Palaemon lindsayi (Villalobos Figueroa & Hobbs, 1974)
- Palaemon litoreus (McCulloch, 1909)
- Palaemon longirostris H. Milne Edwards, 1837
- Palaemon macrodactylus Rathbun, 1902
- Palaemon maculatus (Thallwitz, 1891)
- Palaemon mani (Sollaud, 1914)
- Palaemon mercedae (Pereira, 1986)
- Palaemon mesogenitor (Sollaud, 1912)
- Palaemon mesopotamicus (Pesta, 1913)
- Palaemon mexicanus (Strenth, 1976)
- Palaemon migratorius (Heller, 1862)
- Palaemon minos Tzomos & Koukouras, 2015
- Palaemon miyadii (Kubo, 1938)
- Palaemon modestus (Heller, 1862)
- †Palaemon monsdamarum Pasini & Garassino, 2017
- †Palaemon mortuus Smirnov, 1929
- Palaemon mundusnovus De Grave & Ashelby, 2013
- Palaemon northropi (Rankin, 1898)
- Palaemon octaviae (Chace, 1972)
- Palaemon ogasawaraensis Kato & Takeda, 1981
- Palaemon orientis Holthuis, 1950
- Palaemon ortmanni Rathbun, 1902
- Palaemon pacificus (Stimpson, 1860)
- Palaemon paivai Fausto Filho, 1967
- Palaemon paludosus (Gibbes, 1850)
- Palaemon pandaliformis (Stimpson, 1871)
- Palaemon paucidens De Haan, 1844
- Palaemon peringueyi (Stebbing, 1915)
- Palaemon peruanus Holthuis, 1950
- Palaemon powelli Ashelby & De Grave, 2009
- Palaemon pugio (Holthuis, 1949)
- Palaemon ritteri Holmes, 1895
- Palaemon schmitti (Holthuis, 1950)
- Palaemon semmelinkii (De Man, 1881)
- Palaemon septemtrionalis Katogi, Chiba, Yokoyama, Hatakeyama, Shirai & Komai, 2019
- Palaemon serenus (Heller, 1862)
- Palaemon serratus (Pennant, 1777)
- Palaemon serrifer (Stimpson, 1860)
- Palaemon sewelli (Kemp, 1925)
- Palaemon sinensis (Sollaud, 1911)
- Palaemon styliferus H. Milne Edwards, 1840
- Palaemon suttkusi (Smalley, 1964)
- Palaemon tenuidactylus Liu, Liang & Yan, 1990
- Palaemon texanus (Strenth, 1976)
- Palaemon tonkinensis (Sollaud, 1914)
- Palaemon turcorum (Holthuis, 1961)
- Palaemon varians Leach, 1814
- †Palaemon vesolensis Bravi, Coppa, Garassino & Patricelli, 1999
- Palaemon vicinus Ashelby, 2009
- Palaemon vietnamicus (Nguyên, 1992)
- Palaemon vulgaris Say, 1818
- Palaemon xinjiangensis (Liang, 2000)
- Palaemon xiphias Risso, 1816
- Palaemon yamashitai Fujino & Miyake, 1970
- Palaemon yuna Carvalho, Magalhães & Mantelatto, 2014
- Palaemon zariquieyi (Sollaud, 1938)
