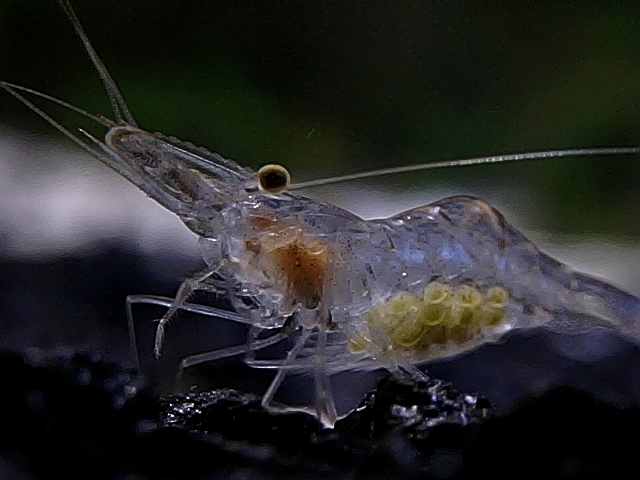
- P. kadiakensis in a freshwater aquarium

Scientific classification
- Kingdom: Animalia
- Phylum: Arthropoda
- Clade: Pancrustacea
- Class: Malacostraca
- Order: Decapoda
- Suborder: Pleocyemata
- Infraorder: Caridea
- Family: Palaemonidae
- Genus: Palaemon
- Species: P. kadiakensis

Binomial name
- Palaemon kadiakensis (Rathbun, 1902) .

Synonyms
- Palaemonetes kadiakensis (Rathbun, 1902)

= Palaemon kadiakensis =

Species of crustacean

Palaemon kadiakensis, commonly known as the Mississippi grass shrimp, is a species of freshwater shrimp from the central United States, specifically the Mississippi River Basin.

== Early development ==
The eggs of Palaemon kadiakensis are 1.4 mm. long or about one twenty-fifth of the adult length. In laboratory settings the incubation period of Palaemon kadiakensis eggs has been observed to be 24–28 days.

After hatching a P. kadiakensis will go through six distinct larval stages before reaching its final adult form. Among larvae reared in experiments, the duration of larval life was 16 to 24 days and the average length of larval life was 19.64 days. In laboratory settings the larvae are fed Artemia salina Nauplius or 100-500 micron sized commercial feed.

Larval development (not to scale)

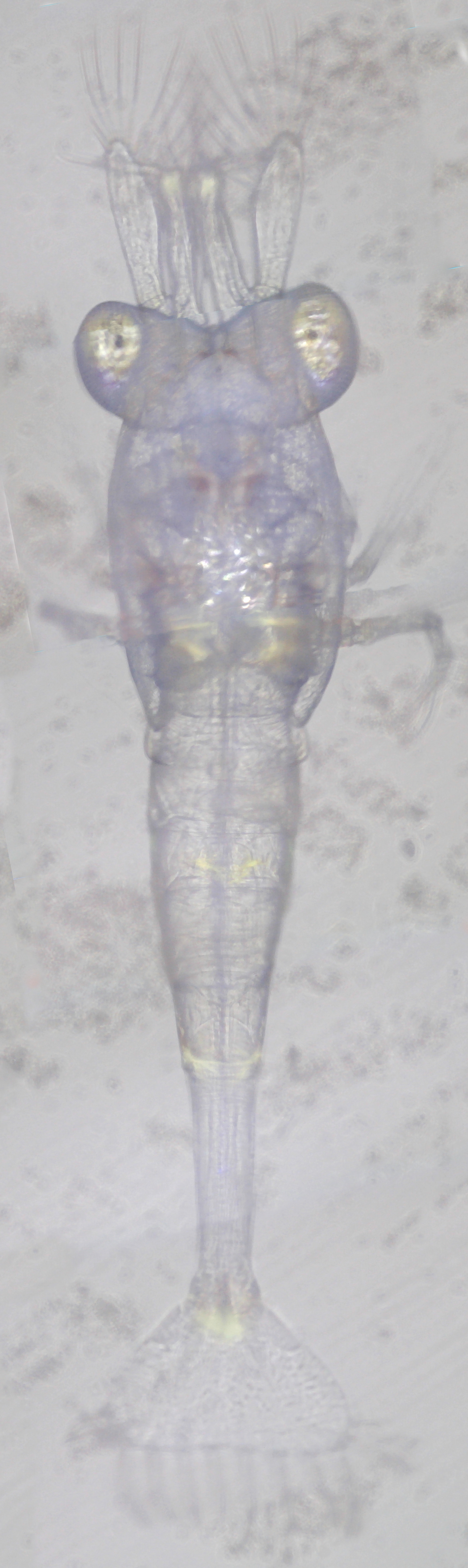
Protozoea first larval stage

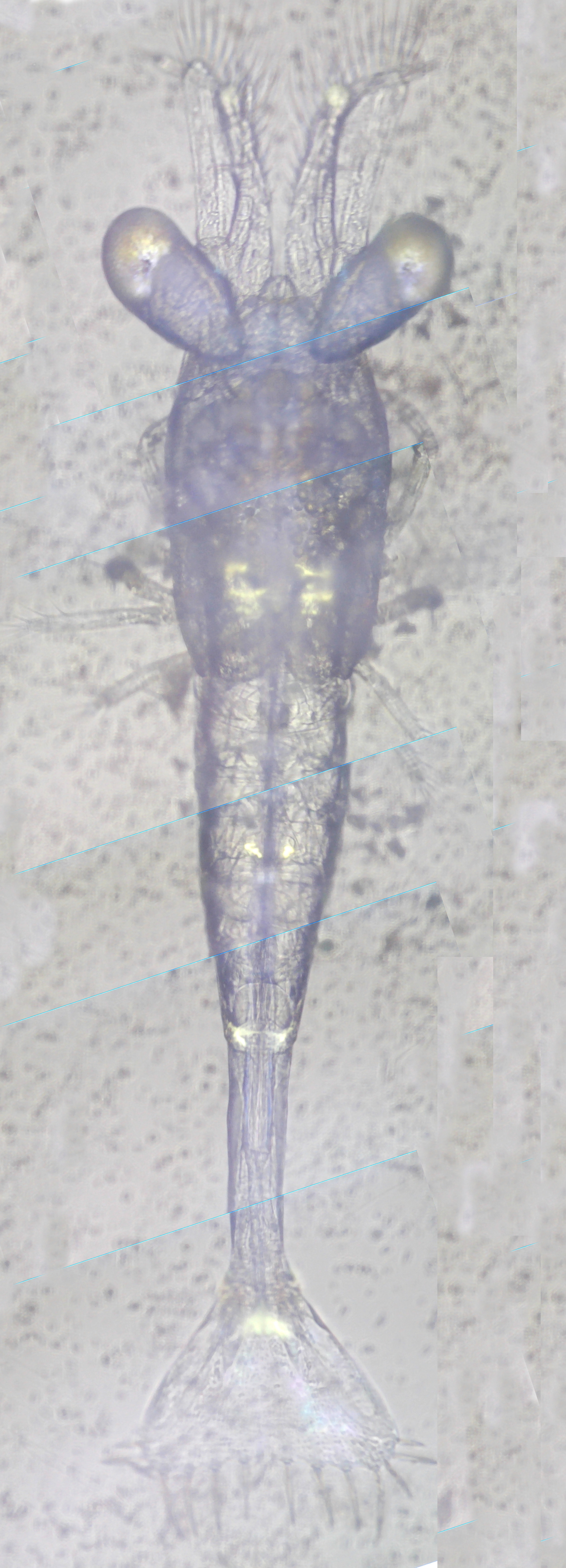
Zoea second larval stage
