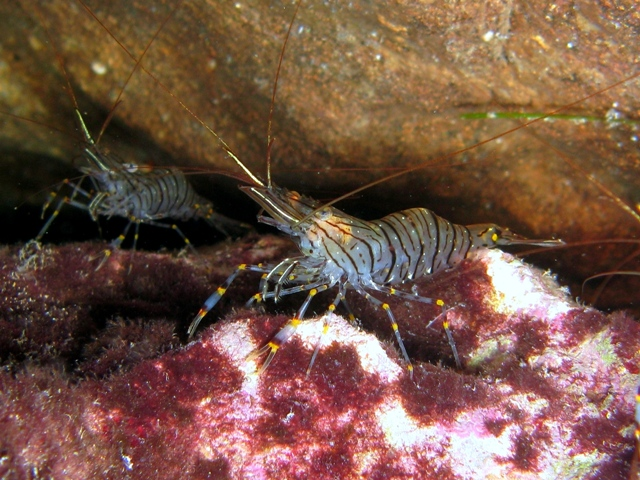

Scientific classification
- Kingdom: Animalia
- Phylum: Arthropoda
- Class: Malacostraca
- Order: Decapoda
- Suborder: Pleocyemata
- Infraorder: Caridea
- Superfamily: Palaemonoidea
- Family: Palaemonidae
- Genus: Palaemon
- Species: P. serratus

Binomial name
- Palaemon serratus (Pennant, 1777)

Synonyms
- Astacus serratus Pennant, 1777; Cancer captivus Nardo, 1847; Leander latreillianus Czerniavsky, 1884; Leander serratus Sharp, 1893; Leander treillianus Adensamer, 1898; Melicerta triliana Risso, 1816; Palaemon oratelli Monod, 1931; Palaemon punctulatus Risso, 1844; Palaemon rostratus Gimenez, 1922; Palaemon treillianus H. Milne-Edwards, 1837; Palaemon trilianus (Risso, 1816); Palaemon trillianus Risso, 1816

= Palaemon serratus =

Species of crustacean

Palaemon serratus, also called the common prawn, is a species of shrimp found in the Atlantic Ocean from Denmark to Mauritania, and in the Mediterranean Sea and Black Sea.

== Ecology ==
Individuals live for 3–5 years in groups in rocky crevices at depths of up to 40 metres (130 ft). Females grow faster than males, and the population is highly seasonal, with a pronounced peak in the autumn. They are preyed upon by a variety of fish, including species of Mullidae, Moronidae, Sparidae and Batrachoididae. P. serratus can sometimes be found with a prominent bulge in its carapace over its gills. This is caused by the presence of an isopod parasite, such as Bopyrus squillarum.

== Description ==
Palaemon serratus may be distinguished from other species of shrimp by the rostrum, which curves upwards, is bifurcated at the tip and has 6–7 teeth along its upper edge, and 4–5 teeth on the lower edge. Other species may have a slightly curved rostrum, but then the teeth on its dorsal surface continue into the distal third, which is untoothed in P. serratus. P. serratus is pinkish brown, with reddish patterns, and is typically 100 millimetres (3.9 in) long, making it the largest of the native shrimp and prawns around the British Isles.

Palaemon serratus is one of the few invertebrates to have its hearing studied in detail; it is sensitive to frequencies between 100 Hz and 3 kHz, with an acuity similar to that of generalist fish. While the hearing range of a P. serratus individual changes as it grows, all are capable of hearing tones at 500 Hz.

== Fisheries ==
A small commercial fishery exists for P. serratus on the west coast of Great Britain, chiefly in West Wales (Cemaes Head to the Llŷn Peninsula), but extending increasingly far north to include parts of Scotland. In Ireland, fishing for P. serratus began at Baltimore, County Cork in the 1970s and subsequently expanded. A peak landing of 548 t was recorded in 1999, and four counties account for over 90% of the catch — Galway, Kerry, Cork and Waterford. There is now concern that the current levels of exploitation may represent overfishing, and measures are being considered to limit the catch, such as a minimum landing size.
