= Macrobrachium veliense =

Conservation status
- Data Deficient (IUCN 3.1)

Scientific classification
- Kingdom: Animalia
- Phylum: Arthropoda
- Class: Malacostraca
- Order: Decapoda
- Suborder: Pleocyemata
- Infraorder: Caridea
- Family: Palaemonidae
- Genus: Macrobrachium
- Species: M. veliense

Binomial name
- Macrobrachium veliense Jayachandran and Joseph, 1985

Species of crustacean

Macrobrachium veliense is a species of freshwater prawn belong the family Palaemonidae.

== Details ==
The species was first described by Jayachandran and Joseph in the year 1985. M. veliense is described from Veli lake and Kuttiyadi River, of Kerala, on the south-west coast of India. This species is closely related to M. nipponense and M. equidens. But it is differed from them by having the lanceolate shape of the rostrum, number of rostrum teeth on both dorsal and ventral margins, smooth nature of the carapace, slender telson and the finger ratio to merus, carpus, propodus and palm of pereipods 1 and 2.
