= Crane River =

Crane River may refer to:

- Crane River, Manitoba, Canada
- O-Chi-Chak-Ko-Sipi First Nation, a First Nations community in Manitoba, formerly known as Crane River
- Macrobrachium formosense, also known as a crane river prawn
