= Macrobrachium patsa =

Scientific classification
- Kingdom: Animalia
- Phylum: Arthropoda
- Clade: Pancrustacea
- Class: Malacostraca
- Order: Decapoda
- Suborder: Pleocyemata
- Infraorder: Caridea
- Family: Palaemonidae
- Genus: Macrobrachium
- Species: M. patsa

Binomial name
- Macrobrachium patsa Coutière, 1899

Species of crustacean

Macrobrachium patsa is a species of freshwater prawn belonging to the genus Macrobrachium. It found in Madagascar. M. patsa was first described in 1899. It is endemic to Madagascar and reported to be found in Patsa river, and the species name derived from the place where it lives. M. pasta reaches a maximum size of 72 mm (total length). Louvel reported this species found among the other fished organisms in Madagascar.
