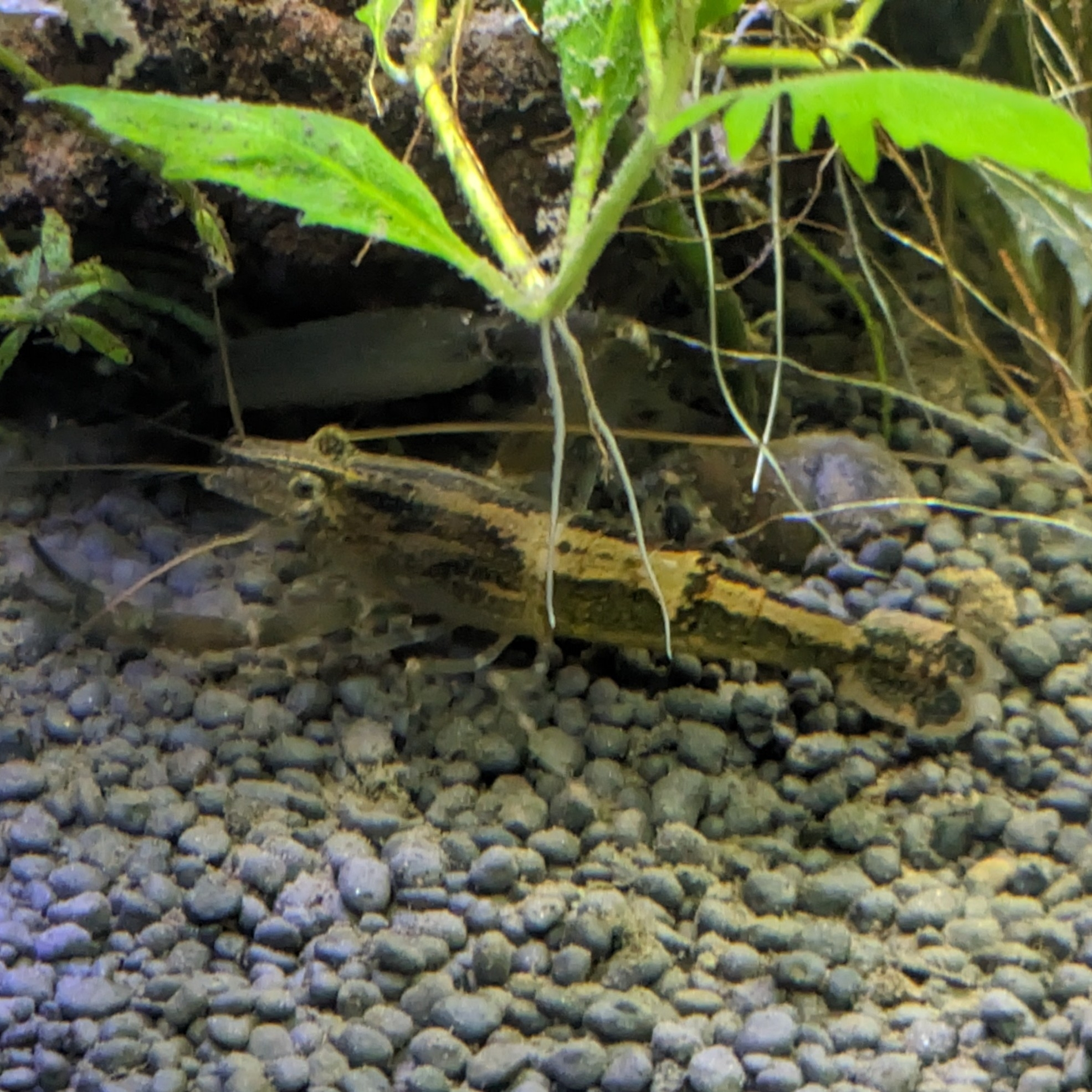
- From Kerala, India.

Conservation status
- Least Concern (IUCN 3.1)

Scientific classification
- Kingdom: Animalia
- Phylum: Arthropoda
- Class: Malacostraca
- Order: Decapoda
- Suborder: Pleocyemata
- Infraorder: Caridea
- Family: Palaemonidae
- Genus: Macrobrachium
- Species: M. scabriculum

Binomial name
- Macrobrachium scabriculum Heller, 1862

Synonyms
- Palaemon scabriculus Heller, 1862; Palaemon dolichodactylus Hilgendorf, 1879; Palaemon dubius Henderson and Matthai, 1910

= Macrobrachium scabriculum =

Species of crustacean

Macrobrachium scabriculum is a species of freshwater shrimp. It is distributed in countries and territories around the Indian Ocean (East Africa, Madagascar, South Asia, Sumatra). It is known as Goda River prawn. The total length of male prawns become about 6.5 cm long and in females it is about 5 cm. A kind of fur develops on the chelipeds of males. Eggs produced by M. scabriculum are smaller in size, brownish in color, elliptical or oval in shape and hatched larvae undergone migration to low saline water for completion its life cycle.

Macrobrachium scabriculum inhabit fresh and brackish water of larger rivers and streams.
