= Macrobrachium zariquieyi =

Scientific classification
- Domain: Eukaryota
- Kingdom: Animalia
- Phylum: Arthropoda
- Class: Malacostraca
- Order: Decapoda
- Suborder: Pleocyemata
- Infraorder: Caridea
- Family: Palaemonidae
- Genus: Macrobrachium
- Species: M. zariquieyi

Binomial name
- Macrobrachium zariquieyi Holthuis, 1849

Species of crustacean

Macrobrachium zariquieyi is a freshwater prawn belonging to the genus Macrobrachium and the family Palaemonidae. It is found in West Africa and reported in Côte d'Ivoire river. The species name of this species is dedicated to Ricardo Zariquiey who worked on Spanish decapods.
