= Macrobrachium jelskii =

Scientific classification
- Kingdom: Animalia
- Phylum: Arthropoda
- Class: Malacostraca
- Order: Decapoda
- Suborder: Pleocyemata
- Infraorder: Caridea
- Family: Palaemonidae
- Genus: Macrobrachium
- Species: M. jelskii

Binomial name
- Macrobrachium jelskii (Miers, 1878)

Species of crustacean

Macrobrachium jelskii is a species of freshwater shrimp under the genus Macrobrachium. It is known as Agar river prawn and is endemic to South America. It is widely distributed in Brazilian water bodies. This prawn is widely used as food, aquarium activity and fish bait which threatens its survival. It is confused with other sympatric species such as M. amazonicum and M. acanthurus where morphometric characteristic features such as size and the shape of the rostrum, the ratio of the carpus and chela, the ratio of the chela and carapace length and the shape of the carpus of the second pereiopod are used to differentiate M. jelskii.
