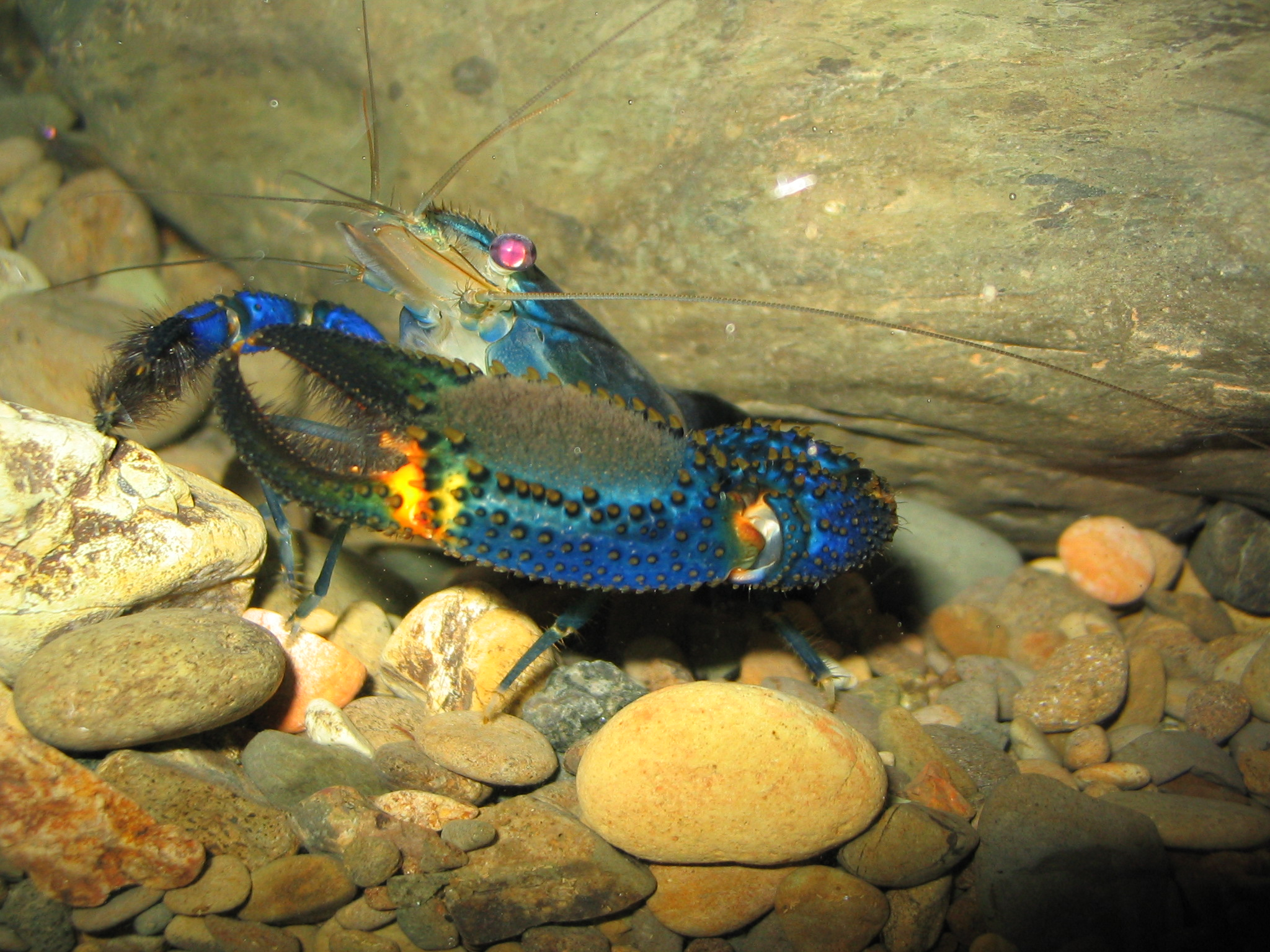

Conservation status
- Least Concern (IUCN 3.1)

Scientific classification
- Kingdom: Animalia
- Phylum: Arthropoda
- Class: Malacostraca
- Order: Decapoda
- Suborder: Pleocyemata
- Infraorder: Caridea
- Family: Palaemonidae
- Genus: Macrobrachium
- Species: M. hancocki

Binomial name
- Macrobrachium hancocki Holthuis, 1950

= Macrobrachium hancocki =

Species of crustacean

Macrobrachium hancocki is a species of freshwater shrimp found from Costa Rica southwards to Colombia and on Cocos Island and the Galápagos Islands. The species primarily inhabits swamp waters, small streams and stagnant pools. This species was first described in 1958.
