= Macrobrachium crenulatum =

Conservation status
- Least Concern (IUCN 3.1)

Scientific classification
- Kingdom: Animalia
- Phylum: Arthropoda
- Class: Malacostraca
- Order: Decapoda
- Suborder: Pleocyemata
- Infraorder: Caridea
- Family: Palaemonidae
- Genus: Macrobrachium
- Species: M. crenulatum

Binomial name
- Macrobrachium crenulatum Holthuis, 1950

Species of crustacean

Macrobrachium crenulatum (Spanish common name: camarón bocú) is an amphidromous freshwater shrimp of the Palaemonidae family in the Decapoda order. It is found in lowland rivers and streams from Panama to Venezuela, as well as on several Caribbean islands. The species is common in the Toro Negro State Forest in central Puerto Rico. Studies have shown that the species have higher sensitivity to environmental, hydrological and chemical factors than other crustaceans also studied and which affect its migratory patterns.
