= Macrobrachium srilankense =

Scientific classification
- Kingdom: Animalia
- Phylum: Arthropoda
- Class: Malacostraca
- Order: Decapoda
- Suborder: Pleocyemata
- Infraorder: Caridea
- Family: Palaemonidae
- Genus: Macrobrachium
- Species: M. srilankense

Binomial name
- Macrobrachium srilankense Costa, H.H., 1979

Species of crustacean

Macrobrachium srilankense is a species of freshwater prawn belong the family Palaemonidae. The species was first described by Costa in the year 1979. It is reported from Sri Lanka.
