= Macrobrachium dayanum =

Conservation status
- Least Concern (IUCN 3.1)

Scientific classification
- Kingdom: Animalia
- Phylum: Arthropoda
- Clade: Pancrustacea
- Class: Malacostraca
- Order: Decapoda
- Suborder: Pleocyemata
- Infraorder: Caridea
- Family: Palaemonidae
- Genus: Macrobrachium
- Species: M. dayanum

Binomial name
- Macrobrachium dayanum Henderson, 1893

Species of freshwater prawn

Macrobrachium dayanum (commonly known as the Kaira river prawn) is a small freshwater prawn, described by John Robertson Henderson in 1893. It is found in Bangladesh, Myanmar, Nepal, and Germany.

== Description ==
Macrobrachium dayanum is a small shrimp, reaching up to 92 mm in males and 84 mm in females. It has an upturned rostrum with 7-11 teeth on the upper edge and 4–7 on the lower. The chela is shorter than the palm and tuberculated, with females having shorter second pereiopods than males. The fingers are about two-thirds the palm length and may have a few short hairs. The body is typically flesh-colored with black pigments, sometimes appearing ash-colored, and features dark brown bands on the chelipeds, antennae, and flagellae. The second cheliped is generally darker, while the swimmers are light ash, and the eggs are yellowish-green.

== Habitat and distribution ==
Macrobrachium dayanum is found in freshwater ponds and flowing waters, including rivers and estuaries in Bangladesh. It is also distributed in Myanmar, Nepal, and North Rhine-Westphalia, Germany. Multivariate analysis indicates it inhabits the Chenab and Ravi river systems as well.

== Aquaculture ==
Macrobrachium dayanum is regarded as economically important and a good source of protein, edible by humans. It is sold in local markets at a price approximately double that of Indian major carp.
