= Macrobrachium villosimanus =

Conservation status
- Least Concern (IUCN 3.1)

Scientific classification
- Kingdom: Animalia
- Phylum: Arthropoda
- Clade: Pancrustacea
- Class: Malacostraca
- Order: Decapoda
- Suborder: Pleocyemata
- Infraorder: Caridea
- Family: Palaemonidae
- Genus: Macrobrachium
- Species: M. villosimanus

Binomial name
- Macrobrachium villosimanus Tiwari, 1949

Species of prawn

Macrobrachium villosimanus, commonly known as the Dimua river prawn, is a species of freshwater prawn belonging to the family Palaemonidae, found in the fresh waters in South Asia.

== Taxonomy ==
Macrobrachium villosimanus was first described in 1949 by Krishna Kant Tiwari as Palaemon villosimanus before being transferred to Macrobrachium.

== Description ==
Macrobrachium villosimanus has a rostrum with a raised crest at the base, which is quite long and has a bare section on the upper edge. Males can grow up to 104 mm, while females can reach a maximum length of 117 mm. It has between 12 and 14 teeth on the upper jaw and 7 to 10 on the lower jaw. The tip of the telson, or tail, goes beyond the longer back spines. In adult males, the carpus of the second pereiopod is subequal to the chela, with the fingers being just under half the length of the palm. The body is flesh-colored, sometimes with dark brown spots. Large yellowish and brownish blotches appear on the sides of the abdomen where the segments meet. The flagella, which are long, whip-like structures, are brownish-red in the outer two-thirds.

The body length and body weight growth rate in males significantly decreases after sexual maturity, while it increases in females after reaching morphological sexual maturity.

== Habitat ==
Macrobrachium villosimanus is commonly found in tidal rivers, and tidal-inundated water bodies. They usually inhabit brackish water areas, including ponds, rivers, estuaries, and streams.

== Reproduction ==
Macrobrachium villosimanus has a continuous breeding season that occurs year-round, with peak activity in March and again from June to December. Female prawns reach sexual maturity at a minimum carapace length of 13.3 mm, where egg volume increases by 42.9% across four stages, and are capable of iteroparous spawning. The number of eggs produced is proportional to the size of the female prawn. The eggs are yellowish and laid in large numbers.
