= Macrobrachium gurudeve =

Scientific classification
- Domain: Eukaryota
- Kingdom: Animalia
- Phylum: Arthropoda
- Class: Malacostraca
- Order: Decapoda
- Suborder: Pleocyemata
- Infraorder: Caridea
- Family: Palaemonidae
- Genus: Macrobrachium
- Species: M. gurudeve

Binomial name
- Macrobrachium gurudeve Jayachandran and Raji, 2004

Species of crustacean

Macrobrachium gurudeve is a species of freshwater shrimp in the family Palaemonidae. It is found in the east flowing rivers such as Kabbini and Bhavani in Kerala, southern state of India. The total length of male prawn reported is 53.5 mm and for female it is 47 mm. Male M. gurudeve is larger than female showing sexual dimorphism in size. The specific name "gurudeve" for this species was given after social reformer, Sree Narayana Gurudev of Kerala state.

M. gurudeve is closely related to M. pegueense and M. kistnens but separated from them by some key characteristic features.
