= Macrobrachium agwi =

Scientific classification
- Domain: Eukaryota
- Kingdom: Animalia
- Phylum: Arthropoda
- Class: Malacostraca
- Order: Decapoda
- Suborder: Pleocyemata
- Infraorder: Caridea
- Family: Palaemonidae
- Genus: Macrobrachium
- Species: M. agwi

Binomial name
- Macrobrachium agwi Klotz, 2008

Species of crustacean

Macrobrachium agwi is a species of freshwater shrimp, first described in 2008, endemic to the Himalaya. It was discovered when a shipment of ornamental prawns, destined for the aquarium trade, was shipped from Cooch Behar, West Bengal, India to Europe. Examination of the shipment showed that one type of shrimp was a new, undescribed species.
