= Macrobrachium vollenhoveni =

Scientific classification
- Kingdom: Animalia
- Phylum: Arthropoda
- Class: Malacostraca
- Order: Decapoda
- Suborder: Pleocyemata
- Infraorder: Caridea
- Family: Palaemonidae
- Genus: Macrobrachium
- Species: M. vollenhoveni

Binomial name
- Macrobrachium vollenhoveni (Herklots, 1857)

Synonyms
- Palaemon vollenhovenii Herklots, 1857

Species of crustacean

Macrobrachium vollenhoveni, the African river prawn, is a species of large, commercially important prawn from the family Palaemonidae from West Africa. It is a catadromous species that moves from freshwater to brackish water to spawn returning to freshwater as larvae. Recent research has shown that it could potentially be used as a biological control to reduce the rates of infection people living near rivers where this species occurs with schistosomiasis.

== Description ==
Macrobrachium vollenhoveni is a large prawn which grows up to 189mm, but is more usually 100-150mm in length. It is generally a pale colour without any spots but with a thin dark longitudinal line on the carapace and transverse stripes across the abdomen and a thin line across the rear margin of the carapace. The third maxillipeds are bright yellow and the fingers of 2nd cheliped is dark blue with a yellow patch at the joint with the palm.

Other identification features include the rostrum being equal to or shorter than the antennal scale; with the dorsal edge being convex over the eye and the tip having a short toothless portion. On the legs the second chelipeds have the Carpus shorter than palm, movable dactyls with a single large tooth at midlength of the dactyl.

== Distribution ==
Macrobrachium vollenhoveni is endemic to West Africa from Senegal to Angola, as well as the islands of Bioko, São Tomé and Cape Verde.

== Biology ==
Macrobrachium vollenhoveni occurs in fresh and brackish waters, including mangrove creeks and inland rivers except for acidic waters. A pre-copulatory form of ritualised behaviour which involves olfactory and tactile cues has been observed, fertilisation involves indirect sperm transfer. Mating in the genus Macrobrachium involves the male depositing spermatophores on the ventral side of the female's thorax, between the pereiopods. The female then releases eggs which pass through the spermatophores and are fertilised. After mating the females carry the eggs downstream from freshwater to the estuarine areas to spawn as the larvae must develop in saline water. As the eggs are unable to hatch at higher salinities the females migrate downstream in the rainy season when salinity in the estuarine areas has been lowered. The larvae then move back upstream into freshwater to complete their development.

M. vollenhoveni is omnivorous and the major part of its diet consists of plant materials, algae, diatoms, protozoa and invertebrates. They are non-selective opportunistic feeders, feeding on plankton, especially Chlorophyta and Bacillariophyta. It has been described as s detritus feeder with a preference for animal remains and has been observed feeding on tadpoles and fish fry.

== Fisheries and aquaculture ==
Macrobrachium vollenhoveni is fished for using leaf and brush traps in both freshwater and brackish water environments. It is not the primary target in most fisheries which are usually targeting the related species of Macrobrachium felicinum and Macrobrachium macrobrachion, although there are reported to be full-time M. vollenhovenii fisheries in Lagos Lagoon, Nigeria at peak season.

Macrobrachium vollenhoveni has been assessed as being very suitable for aquaculture in numerous studies as one of the largest species in the genus Macrobrachium, because it tolerates a wide range of environments and is an omnivore. The methods of aquaculture are very similar to those used to farm the cultured species Macrobrachium rosenbergii. Studies have looked at the nutritional value of the prawns and the possible use of the rather unappetising shells as a sustainable source of meal to use as food in aquaculture systems. As at 2017, large scale aquaculture of M. vollenhoveniihas not taken off, possibly because the requirement for more saline water for hatching eggs has not been understood.

== Use as a biological control for schistosomiasis ==
Macrobrachium vollenhoveni is an omnivore but larger individuals will prey on freshwater snails, including those species which act as intermediate hosts to the parasitic flatworms of the genus Schistosoma which can infect humans and cause the chronic parasitic infection schistosomiasis, also known as bilharzia. On the Senegal River the Diama Dam was built about 50 km from the mouth of the river and blocked the access of prawns up stream of the dam to the brackish water of the estuary for breeding so these populations of prawns eventually collapsed, this in turn led to a huge increase in the rates of infection with Schistosoma of people living near the river up stream of the dam. This inferred that the loss of prawn populations may be linked to the huge increases in rates of infection with Schistosoma. with infection rates attaining 71.8% in some villages.

As M. rosenbergii has been shown to be an effective predator of the snails which act as intermediate hosts to the parasites under laboratory conditions it was thought that the similar M.vollenhoveni potentially would too, and this was shown to be the case. The larger males were more effective in predating the snails so efforts were focussed on producing single sex generations which could be used to populate rivers. As these were males they would grow faster and larger, they would not tend to migrate downstream and they would stay close to where they were introduced to the river. They could also be corralled into shallow water where the snails were concentrated increasing the effectiveness of their predation. The prawns could still be harvested for food as the parasite cannot be passed to humans after being consumed by the prawns. The use of prawns shows potential in helping to control infection rates of schistosomiasis in conjunction with drugs and other biological controls such as catfish and domestic ducks.
