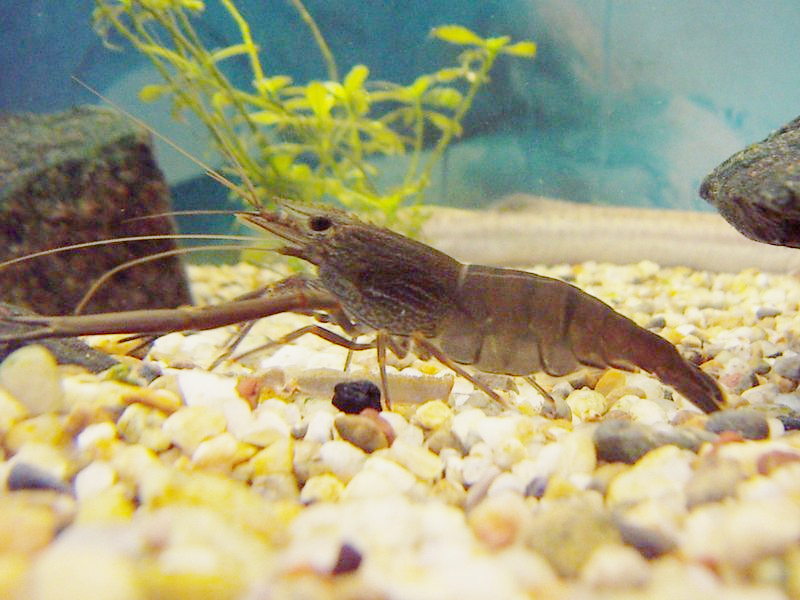

Scientific classification
- Domain: Eukaryota
- Kingdom: Animalia
- Phylum: Arthropoda
- Class: Malacostraca
- Order: Decapoda
- Suborder: Pleocyemata
- Infraorder: Caridea
- Family: Palaemonidae
- Genus: Macrobrachium
- Species: M. japonicum

Binomial name
- Macrobrachium japonicum De Haan, 1849

= Macrobrachium japonicum =

Species of crustacean

Macrobrachium japonicum is a species of freshwater shrimp found in Asia that was first described in 1849.
