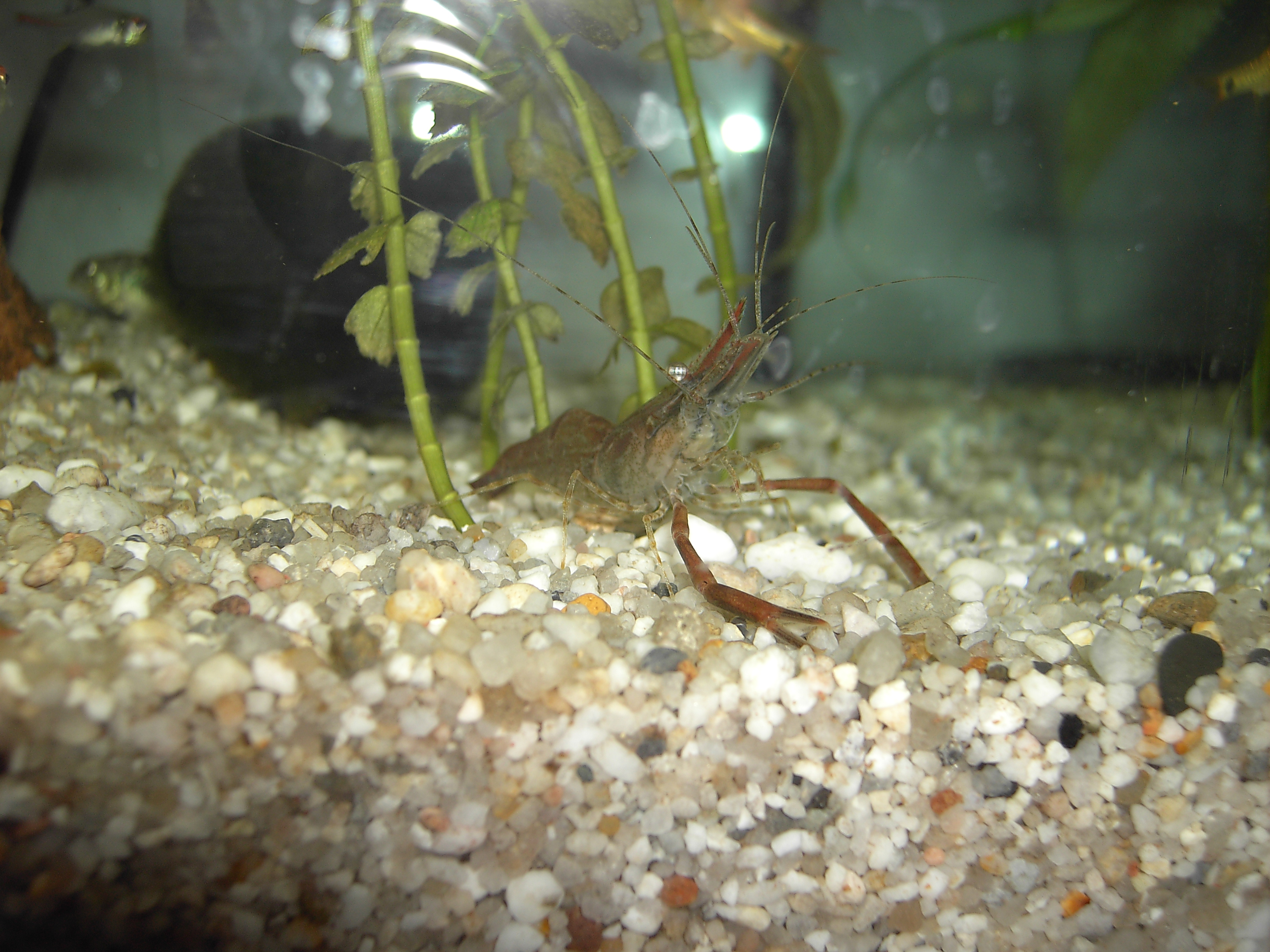

Scientific classification
- Domain: Eukaryota
- Kingdom: Animalia
- Phylum: Arthropoda
- Class: Malacostraca
- Order: Decapoda
- Suborder: Pleocyemata
- Infraorder: Caridea
- Family: Palaemonidae
- Genus: Macrobrachium
- Species: M. assamense

Binomial name
- Macrobrachium assamense Tiwari, 1958

= Macrobrachium assamense =

Species of crustacean

Macrobrachium assamense is a species of freshwater shrimp that was first described in 1958.
