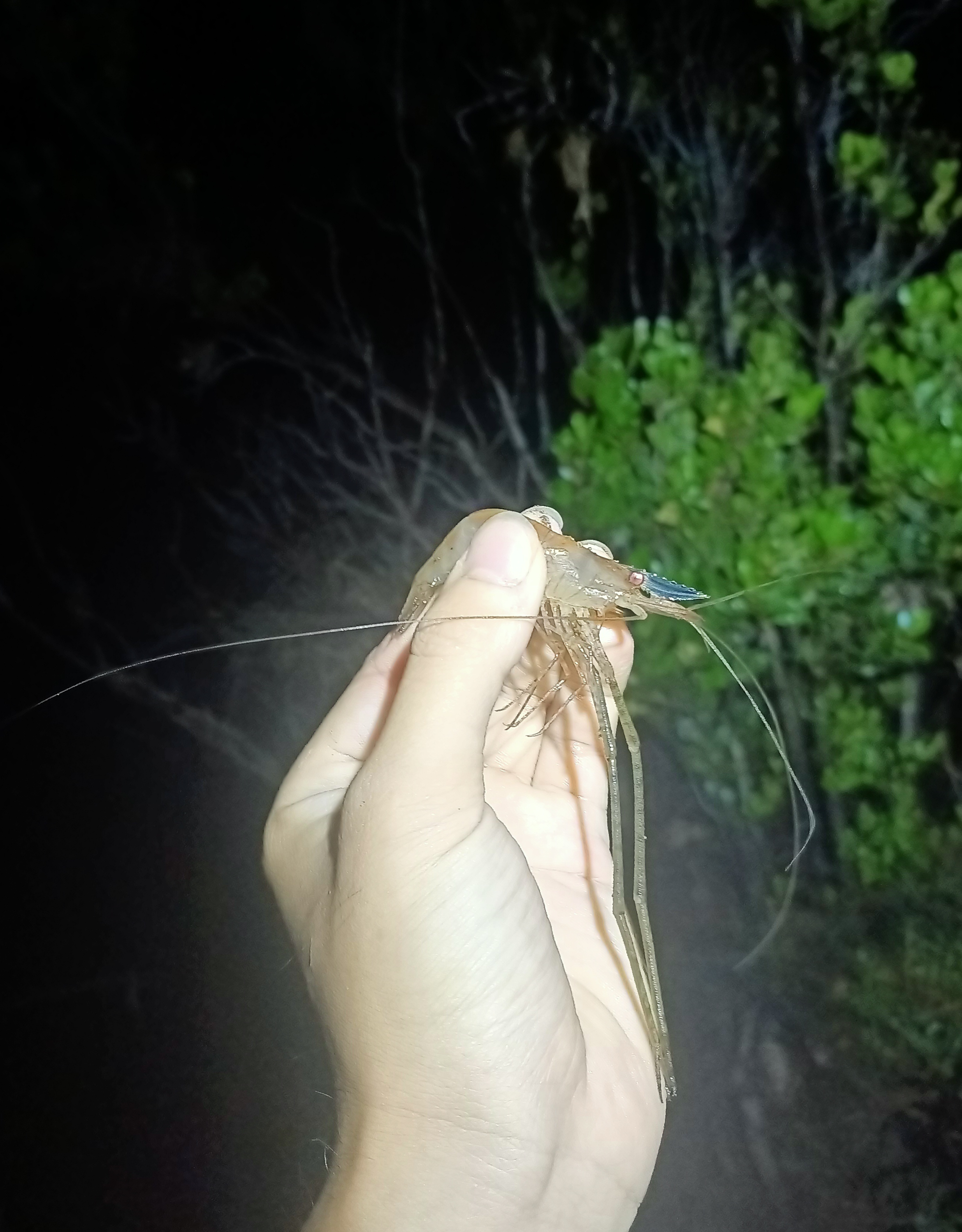
- Macrobrachium australiense showing elongated chelae (front claws), Manning River, New South Wales, Australia

Scientific classification
- Kingdom: Animalia
- Phylum: Arthropoda
- Clade: Pancrustacea
- Class: Malacostraca
- Order: Decapoda
- Suborder: Pleocyemata
- Infraorder: Caridea
- Family: Palaemonidae
- Genus: Macrobrachium
- Species: M. australiense

Binomial name
- Macrobrachium australiense Holthuis, 1950

= Macrobrachium australiense =

Species of freshwater and estuarine prawn

Macrobrachium australiense, also known as Eastern longarm shrimp, is a species of freshwater and estuarine prawn in the family Palaemonidae. It is native to eastern Australia, where it inhabits rivers, streams, and estuarine environments.

== Description ==
Live specimen of Macrobrachium australiense held in hand

Macrobrachium australiense is a small to medium-sized prawn. They have a translucent brownish-green shell and grows up to about 7 cms long. It is characterized by elongated second legs, which becomes particularly prominent in mature specimens and can exceed its body length. These long second legs have small claws at the end, which are used for grabbing and defending its territory. The species exhibit sexual dimorphism with the males typically developing larger second chelipeds than females.

== Distribution and habitat ==
Macrobrachium australiense is one of Australia's most widespread freshwater invertebrates and are found in most of eastern and inland Australia. It commonly occurs in freshwater catchments, as well as estuarine and mangrove-associated habitats along the eastern seaboard. In New South Wales, it has been recorded as an indicator species in estuarine systems including the Manning River, where it occurs in both natural mangrove forests and modified or hybrid shoreline environments.

== Taxonomy ==
Macrobrachium australiense belongs to the genus Macrobrachium. In 2004, a major taxonomic revision of Australian Macrobrachium recognised M. australiense as a valid species and synonymised several previously named forms under it.

== Molecular biology ==
Comparative transcriptomic studies found Macrobrachium australiense exhibited species-specific differences in gene expression when exposed to salinity, relative to related species. Mitochondrial DNA analyses found large genetic divergence among populations of Macrobrachium australiense across Australian freshwater drainage basins, reflecting long-term isolation between inland and coastal regions.

== Ecology ==
Like other members of the genus Macrobrachium, M. australiense is an omnivorous prawn and as a consumer of organic material, it contributes to nutrient cycling in freshwater and estuarine ecosystems. It is also part of the diet of fish and other aquatic predators in Australian river systems.
