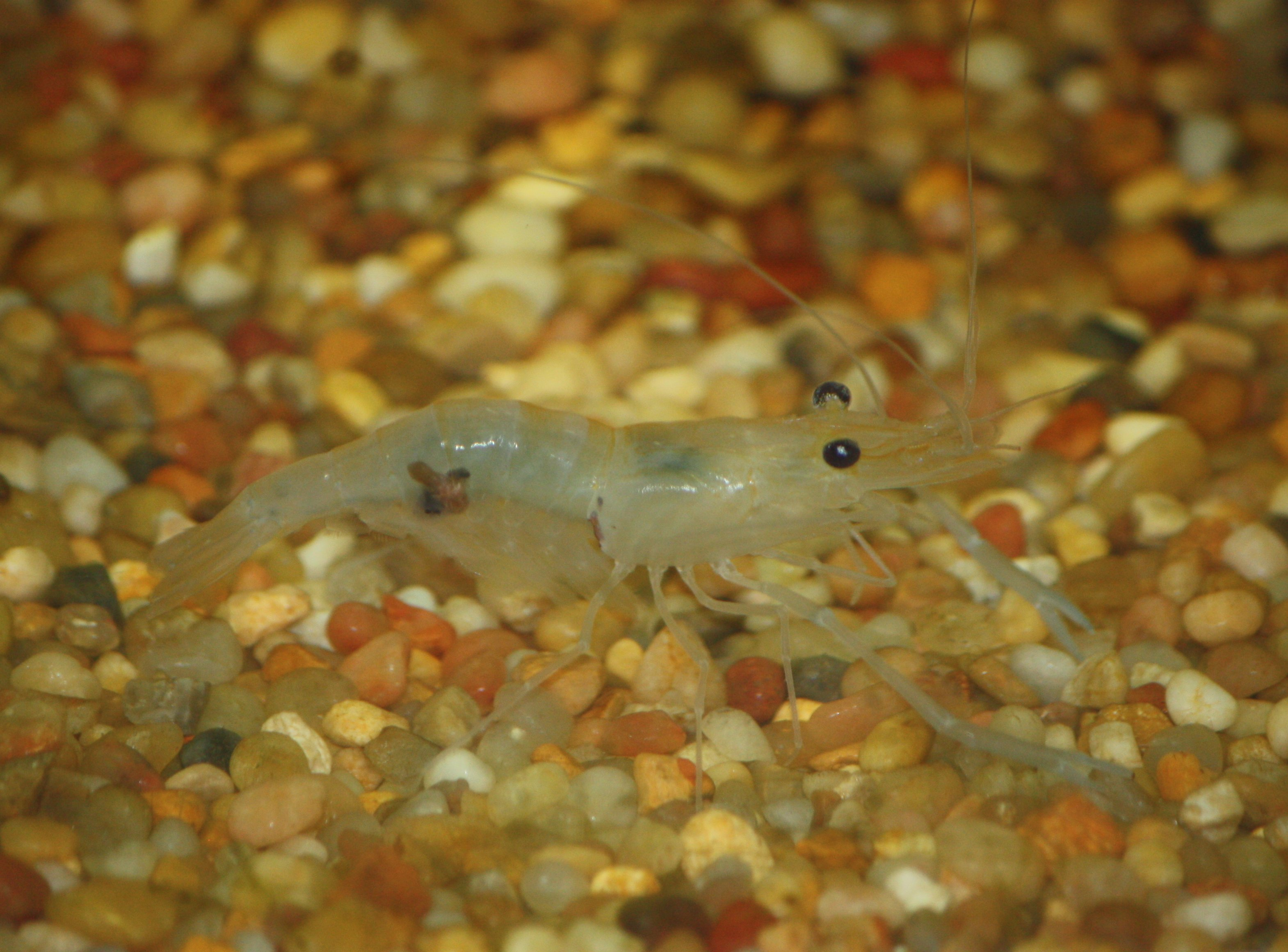

Scientific classification
- Domain: Eukaryota
- Kingdom: Animalia
- Phylum: Arthropoda
- Class: Malacostraca
- Order: Decapoda
- Suborder: Pleocyemata
- Infraorder: Caridea
- Family: Palaemonidae
- Genus: Macrobrachium
- Species: M. lamarrei

Binomial name
- Macrobrachium lamarrei H. Milne Edwards, 1837

= Macrobrachium lamarrei =

Species of crustacean

Macrobrachium lamarrei commonly known as the Indian whisker shrimp, kuncho river prawn is a nocturnal species of freshwater shrimp found Biratnagar, Nepal.
