= Macrobrachium indicum =

Scientific classification
- Domain: Eukaryota
- Kingdom: Animalia
- Phylum: Arthropoda
- Class: Malacostraca
- Order: Decapoda
- Suborder: Pleocyemata
- Infraorder: Caridea
- Family: Palaemonidae
- Genus: Macrobrachium
- Species: M. indicum

Binomial name
- Macrobrachium indicum Jayachandran, & Joseph, 1986

Species of crustacean

Macrobrachium indicum is a species of freshwater shrimp of South India. It was first described in 1986. This freshwater prawn was described from Vellayani Lake, Kerala. This species is closely related to M. australe and M. ustulatum. It is a medium-sized prawn of genus Macrobrachium.
