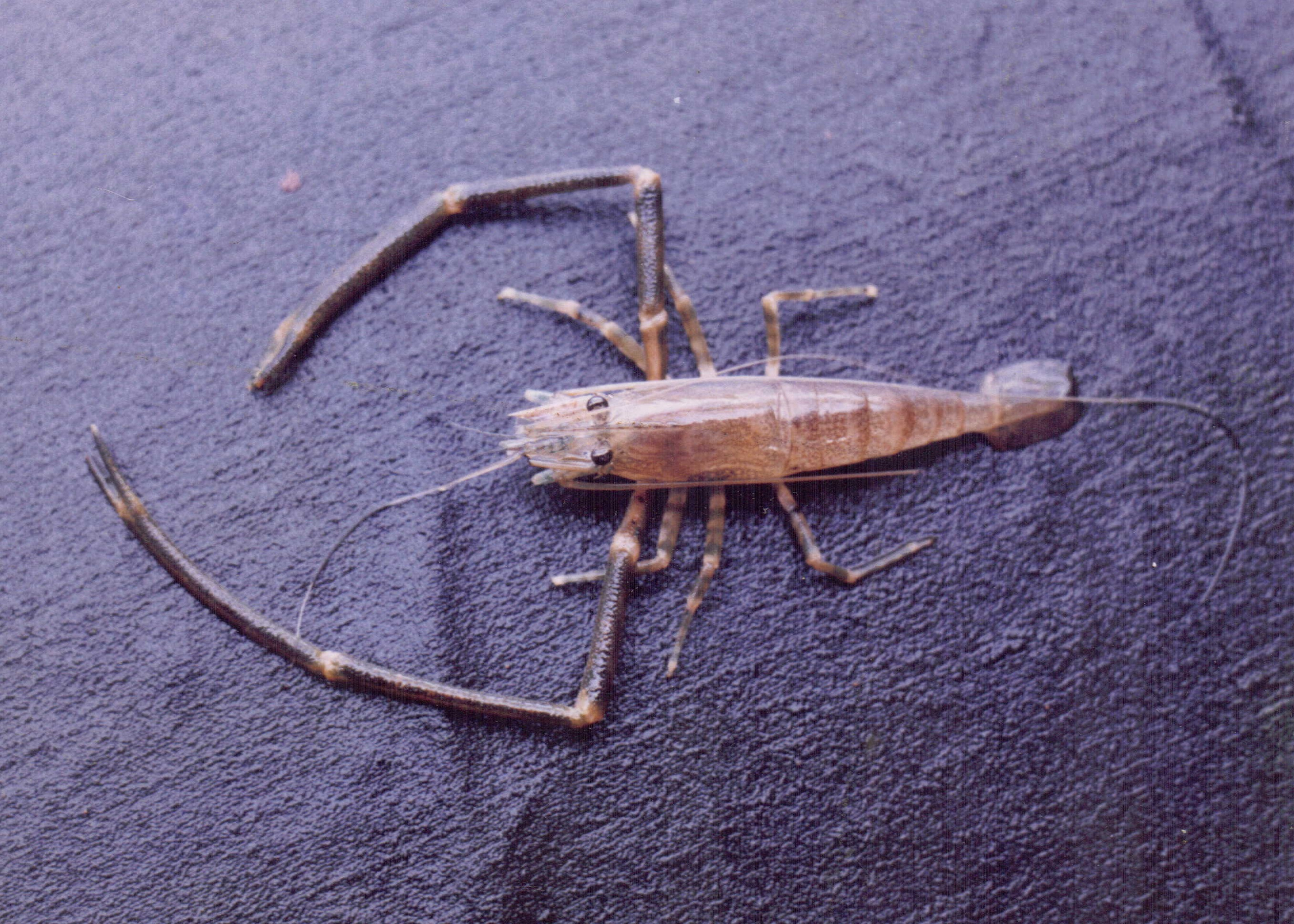
- Male M. nobilii with heterochelae major chela on its left side (left handedness)

Scientific classification
- Kingdom: Animalia
- Phylum: Arthropoda
- Clade: Pancrustacea
- Class: Malacostraca
- Order: Decapoda
- Suborder: Pleocyemata
- Infraorder: Caridea
- Family: Palaemonidae
- Genus: Macrobrachium
- Species: M. nobilii

Binomial name
- Macrobrachium nobilii Henderson and Matthai, 1910

= Macrobrachium nobilii =

Species of freshwater prawn

Macrobrachium nobilii is a species of freshwater shrimp, first described by Henderson and Matthai, 1910. It belongs to the order Decapoda and family Palaemonidae.

== Distribution ==
The caridean prawn is distributed South East India, New Caledonia, Gavataks and Tuamotu Island. In India, it is reported from freshwater lakes of Chengalpattu District of Tamil Nadu. M. nobilii also has been reported from the river Cauvery in between Mettur Dam and Poomphuhar Estuary.

== Key characters ==
This freshwater prawn is known as stone prawn locally since its affinity is with the substrates such as stones/pebbles found in the bottom of its habitat. M. nobilii is characterized by its prominent or elongated second pair of chelate appendage in which the carpus is distinctly large than the merus. The large chela have teeth in the proximal part of the cutting edges. In the rostrum the first four or five teeth are situated behind the posterior orbital margin.

== Biology ==
Macrobrachium nobilii is a diecdysic, moulting and breeding once in 18–22 days. Males are larger than females. Male M. nobilii had a body weight of 12676 mg and the body weight of female is reported as 7178 mg. An average female incubates about 2200 eggs/clutch for a period of 14 days. On completion of development eggs are hatched out in irregular batches within 6 days. On hatching, the larvae passively drift to the estuary where they complete their development. On completion of the larval development the juveniles actively migrate to the freshwater grounds.
