= Macrobrachium indianum =

Scientific classification
- Domain: Eukaryota
- Kingdom: Animalia
- Phylum: Arthropoda
- Class: Malacostraca
- Order: Decapoda
- Suborder: Pleocyemata
- Infraorder: Caridea
- Family: Palaemonidae
- Genus: Macrobrachium
- Species: M. indianum

Binomial name
- Macrobrachium indianum Pillai et al., 2015

Species of crustacean

Macrobrachium indianum is a species of freshwater prawn of South India. It was first described in 2015. This freshwater prawn was described from Pamba River, Kerala. This species is closely related to M. gurudeve, M. bombayense and M. kulkarnii.
