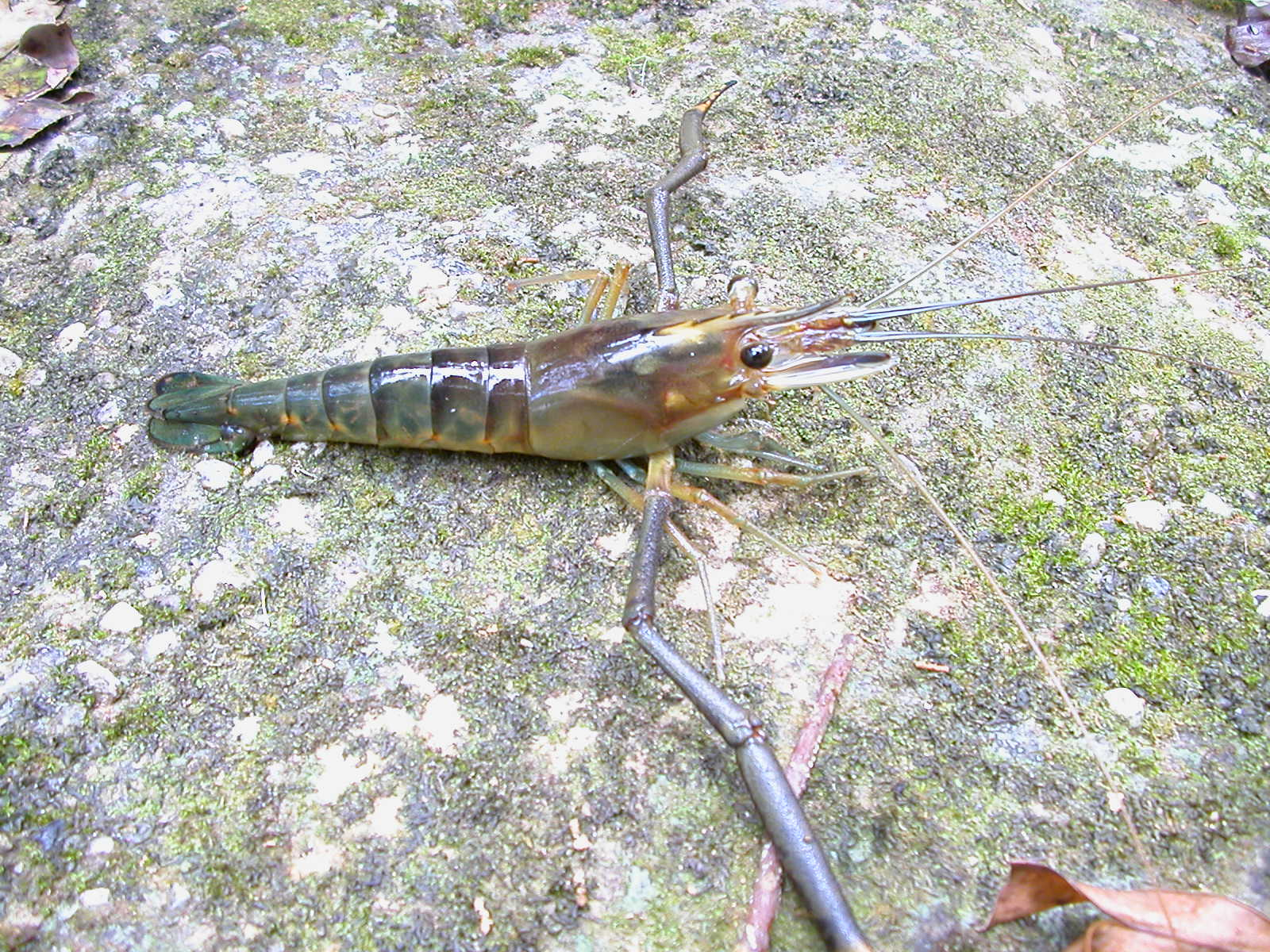

Scientific classification
- Domain: Eukaryota
- Kingdom: Animalia
- Phylum: Arthropoda
- Class: Malacostraca
- Order: Decapoda
- Suborder: Pleocyemata
- Infraorder: Caridea
- Family: Palaemonidae
- Genus: Macrobrachium
- Species: M. lar

Binomial name
- Macrobrachium lar Fabricius, 1798

Synonyms
- Cancer teatae Curtiss, 1938; Leander dionyx Nobili, 1905; Macrobrachium ornatus Jayachandran & Raji, 2004; Palaemon lar Fabricius, 1798; Palaemon longimanus Fabricius, 1798; Palaemon longimanus Hoffman, 1874; Palaemon madagascariensis Hoffman, 1874; Palaemon mayottensis Hoffman, 1874; Palaemon ornatus Olivier, 1811; Palaemon reunionnensis Hoffman, 1874; Palaemon ruber Hess, 1865; Palaemon spectabilis Heller, 1862; Palaemon spectabilis Heller, 1865; Palaemon tridens White, 1847; Palaemon vagus Heller, 1862

= Macrobrachium lar =

Species of crustacean

Macrobrachium lar, commonly known as the Camaron or the Monkey River Prawn, is a species of freshwater shrimp found throughout the Indo-West Pacific area, ranging from East Africa through to the Marquesas Islands and was first described in 1798. This species is found in flowing rivers and creeks near sea level.
