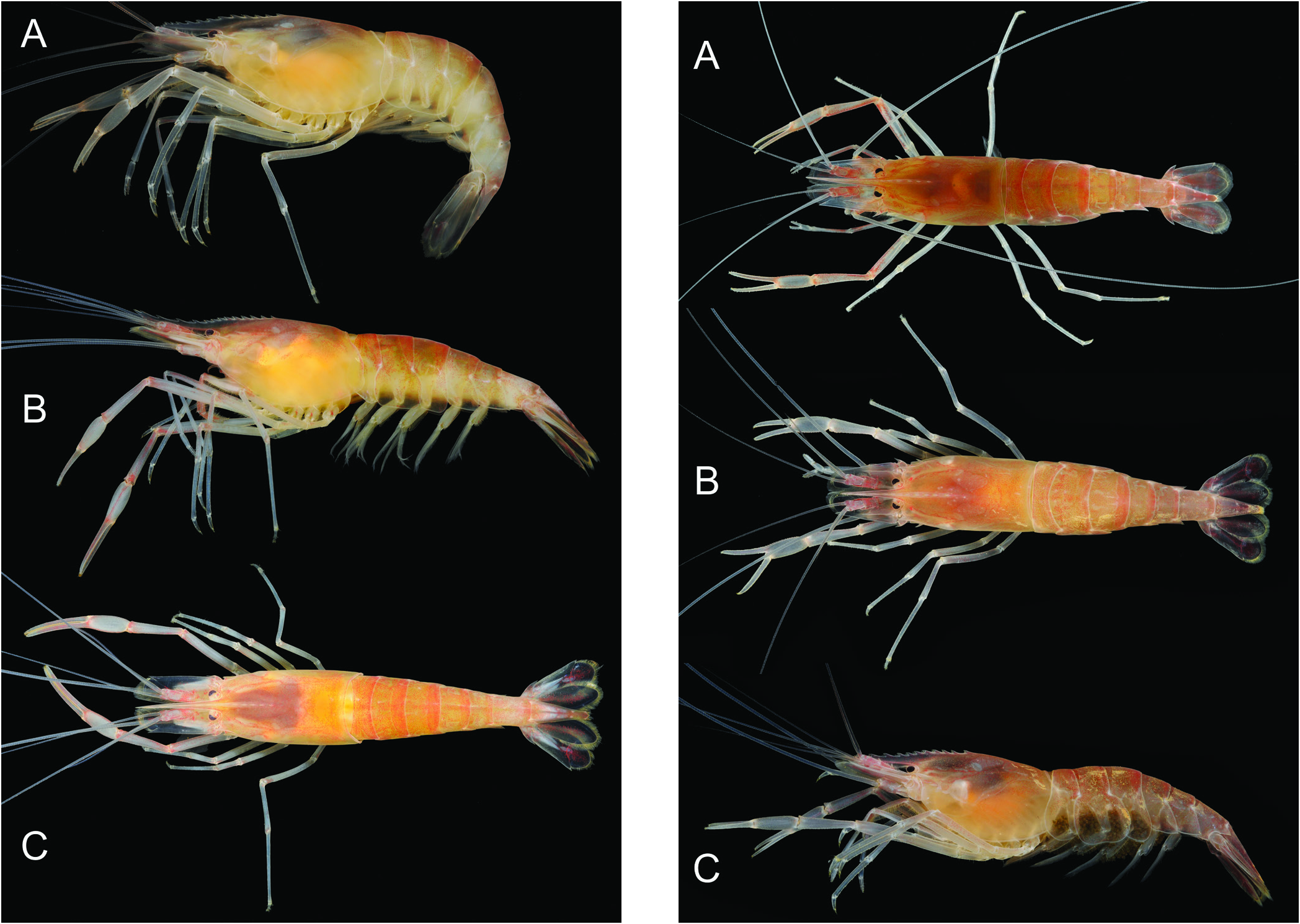

Scientific classification
- Kingdom: Animalia
- Phylum: Arthropoda
- Class: Malacostraca
- Order: Decapoda
- Suborder: Pleocyemata
- Infraorder: Caridea
- Family: Palaemonidae
- Genus: Macrobrachium
- Species: M. xmas

Binomial name
- Macrobrachium xmas Fujita, Davie & Ng, 2015.

= Macrobrachium xmas =

Species of crustacean

Macrobrachium xmas is a stygobitic palaemonid shrimp endemic to the anchialine caves of Christmas Island, an Australian territory in the Indian Ocean. Individuals are medium in size with a color ranging from white to yellow. They live in brackish water with other small cave-dwelling shrimp and crabs. The species is sometimes commonly referred to as the Christmas Island cave prawn.

== Description ==
Macrobrachium xmas is a medium-sized stygobitic shrimp commonly referred to as a "prawn" in Indonesia and Australia. A stygobitic species is one that is adapted to life in underground aquatic habitats. The males reach a length of approximately 67 mm. It has a long, slender rostrum, extending past the base of the antennae, with 12–15 small teeth along the top edge and 3–8 along the bottom. Its eyes are small and partially pigmented, set on thickened stalks. The first pair of legs are slender and similar in size, while the second pair are stronger and spiny, especially in males. The walking legs are thin, with the fifth pair longest. The body is mostly white to yellow.

== Distribution ==
The species is endemic to brackish, anchialine caves on Christmas Island, an Australian territory in the Indian Ocean. The island is a volcanic seamount covered with limestone deposits formed from coral and other marine debris. The dissolution of the limestone creates karst terrain, forming solutional caves with anchialine pools, coastal pools with brackish water filled with a mixture of seawater, rainwater and groundwater. There are at least 30 known anchialine caves on Christmas Island. Stygobitic fauna, mostly crustaceans, are adapted to life in dark, underground aquatic habitats within these caves.

Specimens of Macrobrachium xmas were collected from three anchialine caves on the island. Within these caves, it shares its habitat with other small shrimp and crabs, including Procaris noelensis, the snapping shrimp (Metabetaeus minutus), a barbouriid shrimp (Parhippolyte sp.), a dwarf shrimp (Antecaridina lauensis), karst-dwelling crabs (Karstarma jacksoni), and troglobitic crabs such as Orcovita hicksi and Orcovita orchardorum.

== Taxonomy ==
Fujita, Davie, and Ng formally described Macrobrachium xmas on 25 December 2015. Their work was based on specimens collected from Christmas Island during an expedition for the Raffles Museum of Biodiversity Research in January 2010 and March 2011, with funding from the National University of Singapore and the Australian Biological Resources Study.

Macrobrachium xmas belongs to the family Palaemonidae within the order Decapoda. Of the 262 species in the genus, most are freshwater, with less than 20 living in estuarine and marine environments. Of the hundreds of species, just over a dozen are stygobitic. Macrobrachium xmas is one of the few known stygobitic species in the genus that lives in anchialine caves. Macrobrachium xmas is commonly referred to as the Christmas Island cave prawn.

Morphologically, Macrobrachium xmas is most similar to Macrobrachium miyakoense, a rare stygobitic species from the Ryukyu Islands. Macrobrachium xmas was originally distinguished by its longer and thinner rostrum, reduced eyes on thicker eyestalks, and additional postrostral dorsal teeth on the carapace. In 2018, Maruyama & Fujita obtained a new specimen of Macrobrachium miyakoense and showed that the diagnostic criteria used in the 2015 paper were too ambiguous when it came to differentiating eyestalk swelling between the two species. The authors recommended addressing the problem by acquiring additional specimens and molecular data.

Location of Christmas Island

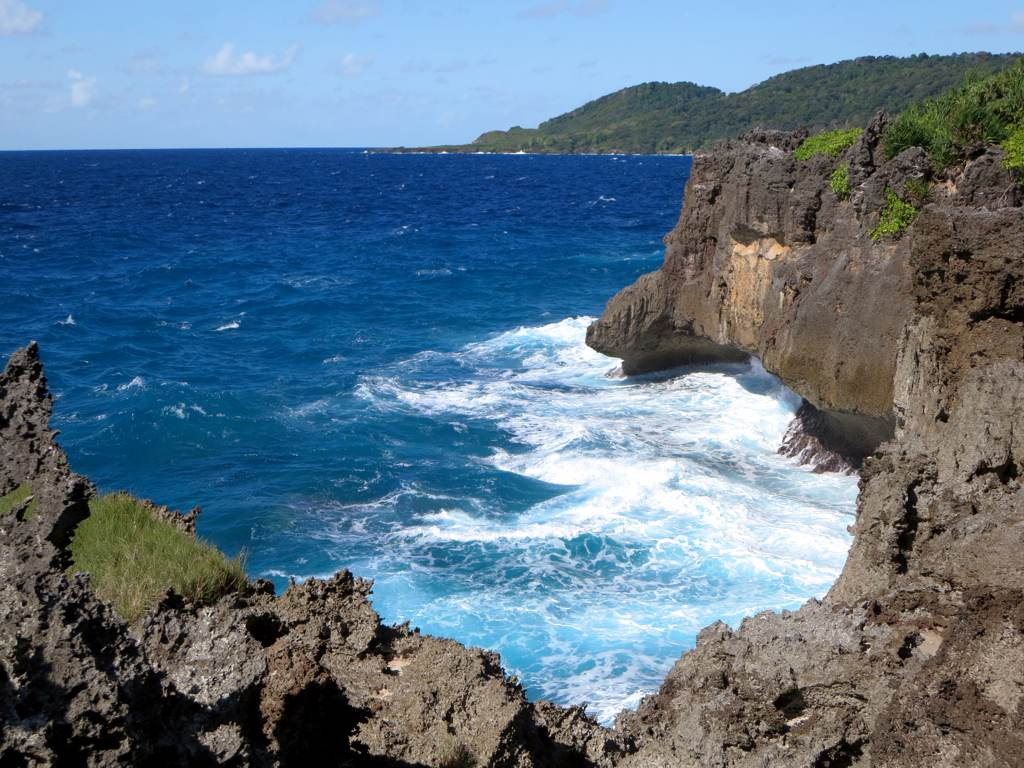
Limestone cliffs along the 73 km coastline

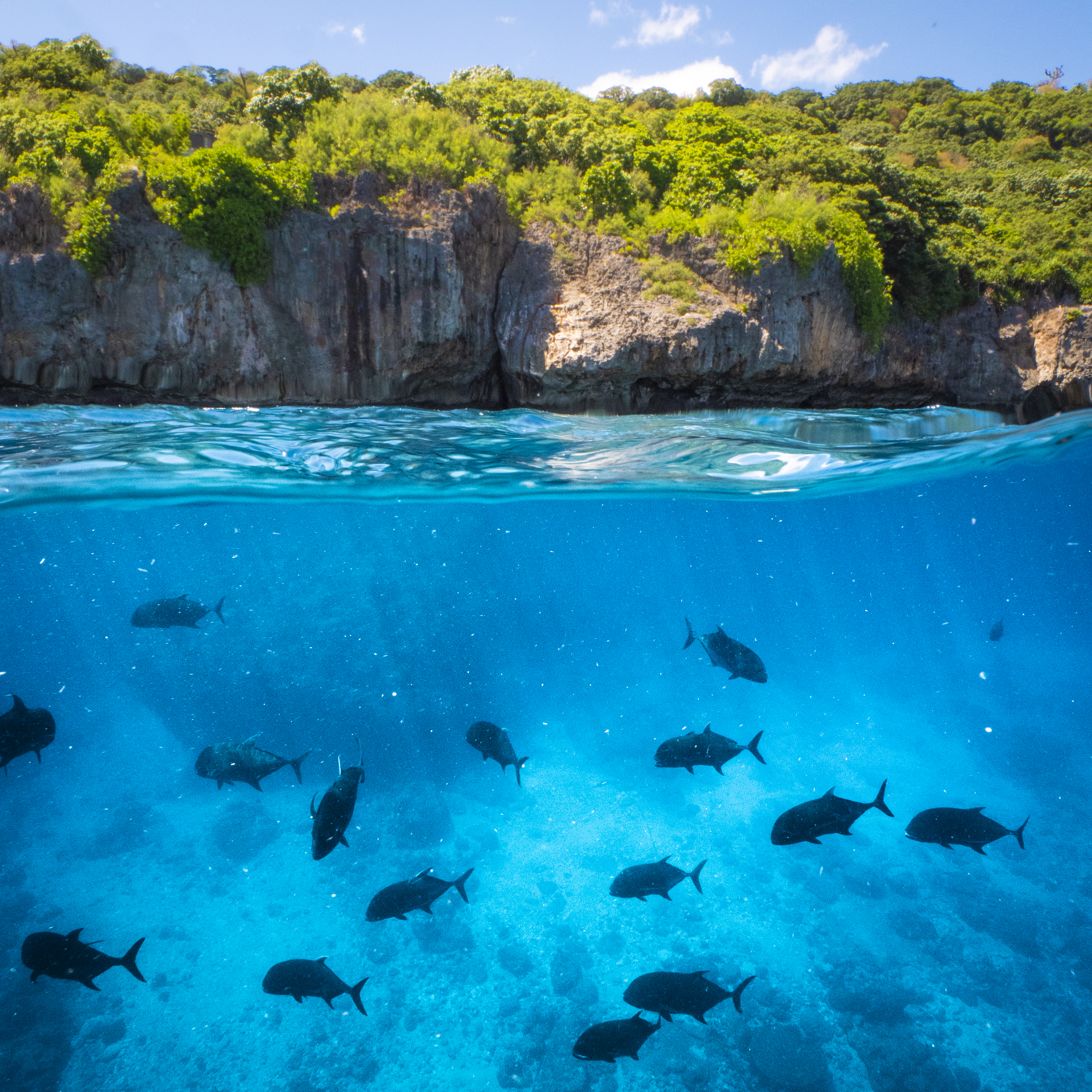
Coral reefs built up over volcanic basalt seamount

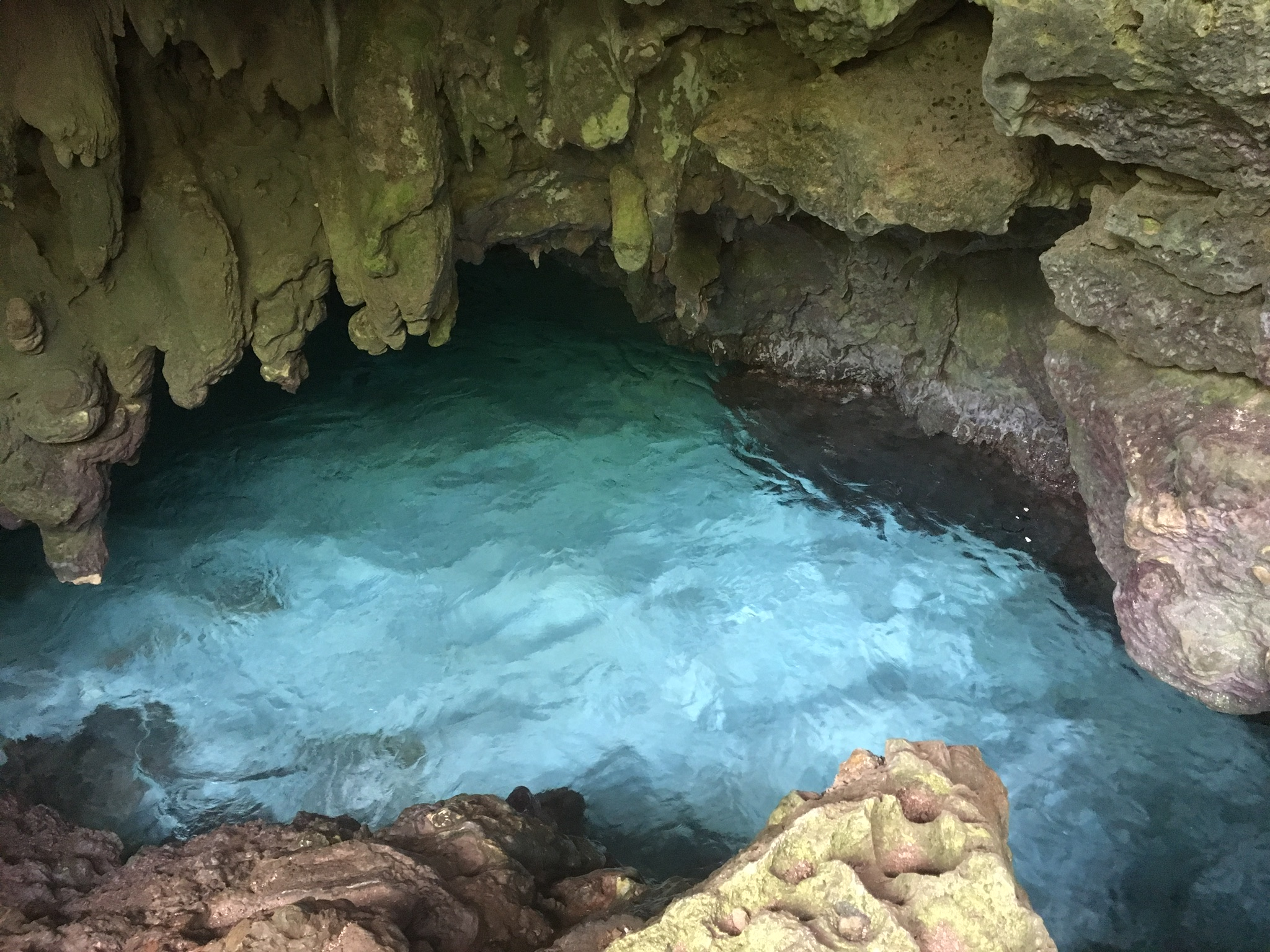
Grotto cave
