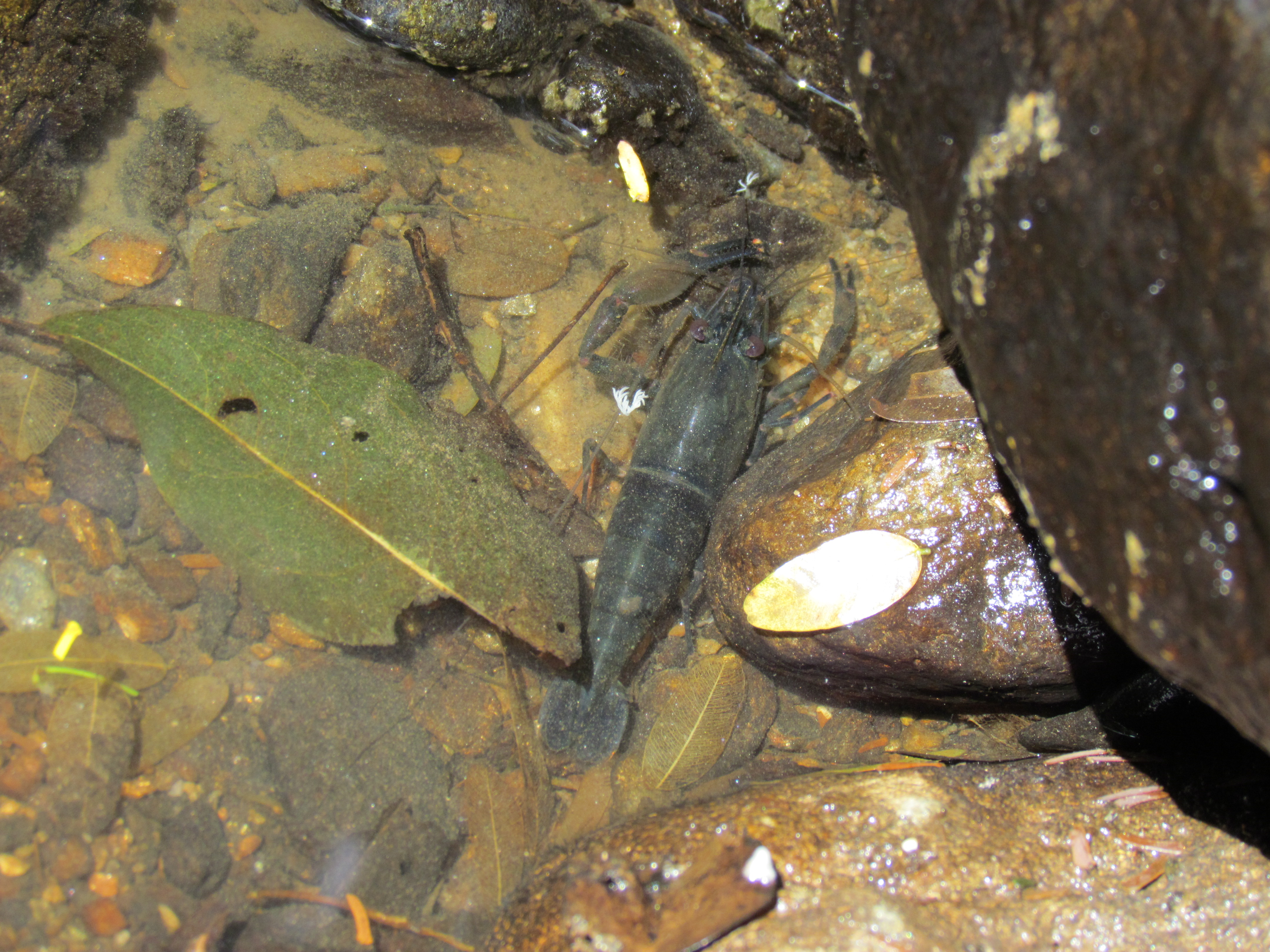

Scientific classification
- Domain: Eukaryota
- Kingdom: Animalia
- Phylum: Arthropoda
- Class: Malacostraca
- Order: Decapoda
- Suborder: Pleocyemata
- Infraorder: Caridea
- Family: Palaemonidae
- Genus: Macrobrachium
- Species: M. faustinum

Binomial name
- Macrobrachium faustinum de Saussure, 1857

= Macrobrachium faustinum =

Species of crustacean

Macrobrachium faustinum is a species of freshwater shrimp that was first described in 1857. M. faustinum is dark brown and found from Florida to the Caribbean and southwards to Venezuela.
