= Macrobrachium walvanense =

Scientific classification
- Domain: Eukaryota
- Kingdom: Animalia
- Phylum: Arthropoda
- Class: Malacostraca
- Order: Decapoda
- Suborder: Pleocyemata
- Infraorder: Caridea
- Family: Palaemonidae
- Genus: Macrobrachium
- Species: M. walvanense

Binomial name
- Macrobrachium walvanense Almelkar et al., 1999

Species of crustacean

Macrobrachium walvanense is a species of freshwater shrimp. It was first described in 1999 by Almelkar and coworkers. M. walvanense is collected from the Walvan Dam at Lonavala, near Pune (Maharashtra State, India). It is a medium-sized freshwater prawn grows a maximum size (Total Length) of 50 mm. Body is translucent with branched reddish-brown chromatophores spread from carpus to fingertips of second chelipeds. The features of rostrum, second cheliped, and telson are made it differs from M. banjarae.
