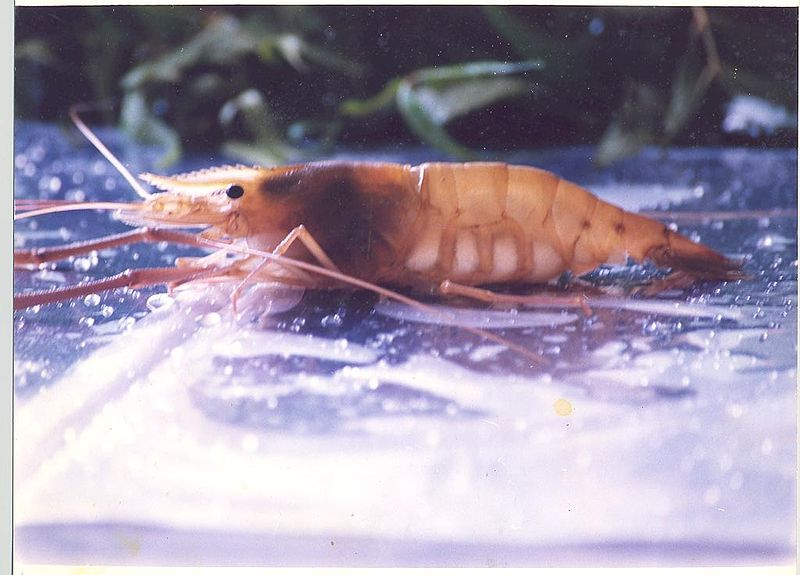

Scientific classification
- Kingdom: Animalia
- Phylum: Arthropoda
- Class: Malacostraca
- Order: Decapoda
- Suborder: Pleocyemata
- Infraorder: Caridea
- Family: Palaemonidae
- Genus: Macrobrachium
- Species: M. malcolmsonii

Binomial name
- Macrobrachium malcolmsonii (Milne-Edwards, 1844)

Synonyms
- Palaemon malcolmsonii H. Milne Edwards, 1844

= Macrobrachium malcolmsonii =

Species of crustacean

Macrobrachium malcolmsonii is an omnivorous, bottom-dwelling, freshwater prawn. Its common name is monsoon river prawn.

It feeds on decomposing plants and animals, small worms, insects, and their larvae. They are also cannibalistic in nature and may consume freshly molted conspecifics. In Asian countries, particularly in India, Pakistan, and Bangladesh, the freshwater prawn species M. malcolmsonii, M. rosenbergii, and M. gangeticum are of special interest for aquaculture. M. malcolmsonii is nocturnal in habit and feed more actively at night. Being an indigenous fresh water river species M. malcolmsonii is more tolerant to environmental fluctuations and comparatively more resistant to contaminants. Males grow bigger than females, and even in the same sex there exists heterogeneity in growth. Those that grow faster tend to become dominant, while others remain stunted.
