= Pseudopalaemon bouvieri =

Scientific classification
- Kingdom: Animalia
- Phylum: Arthropoda
- Clade: Pancrustacea
- Class: Malacostraca
- Order: Decapoda
- Suborder: Pleocyemata
- Infraorder: Caridea
- Family: Palaemonidae
- Genus: Pseudopalaemon
- Species: P. bouvieri

Binomial name
- Pseudopalaemon bouvieri Sollaud, 1911

Species of shrimp

Pseudopalaemon bouvieri is a species of shrimp of the family Palaemonidae. The broad-snouted caiman frequently preys upon Pseudopalaemon bouvieri. Pseudopalaemon bouvieri is omnivorous.
