= Macrobrachium dienbienphuense =

Scientific classification
- Kingdom: Animalia
- Phylum: Arthropoda
- Clade: Pancrustacea
- Class: Malacostraca
- Order: Decapoda
- Suborder: Pleocyemata
- Infraorder: Caridea
- Family: Palaemonidae
- Genus: Macrobrachium
- Species: M. dienbienphuense

Binomial name
- Macrobrachium dienbienphuense Dang & Nguyen, 1972

Species of shrimp

Macrobrachium dienbienphuense is a species of shrimp of the family Palaemonidae. Macrobrachium dienbienphuense will walk on land to avoid dams and rapids, a behavior known as "parading". While doing so, they are vulnerable to predators such as spiders.
