= Macrobrachium banjarae =

Scientific classification
- Domain: Eukaryota
- Kingdom: Animalia
- Phylum: Arthropoda
- Class: Malacostraca
- Order: Decapoda
- Suborder: Pleocyemata
- Infraorder: Caridea
- Family: Palaemonidae
- Genus: Macrobrachium
- Species: M. banjarae

Binomial name
- Macrobrachium banjarae Tiwari, 1958

Species of shrimp

Macrobrachium banjarae is a species of freshwater shrimp that was first described in 1958. Macrobrachium banjarae belongs to the family Palaemonidae. It is an endemic prawn found India, in the states of Andhra Pradesh, Karnataka, Madhya Pradesh, Maharashtra and West Bengal.
