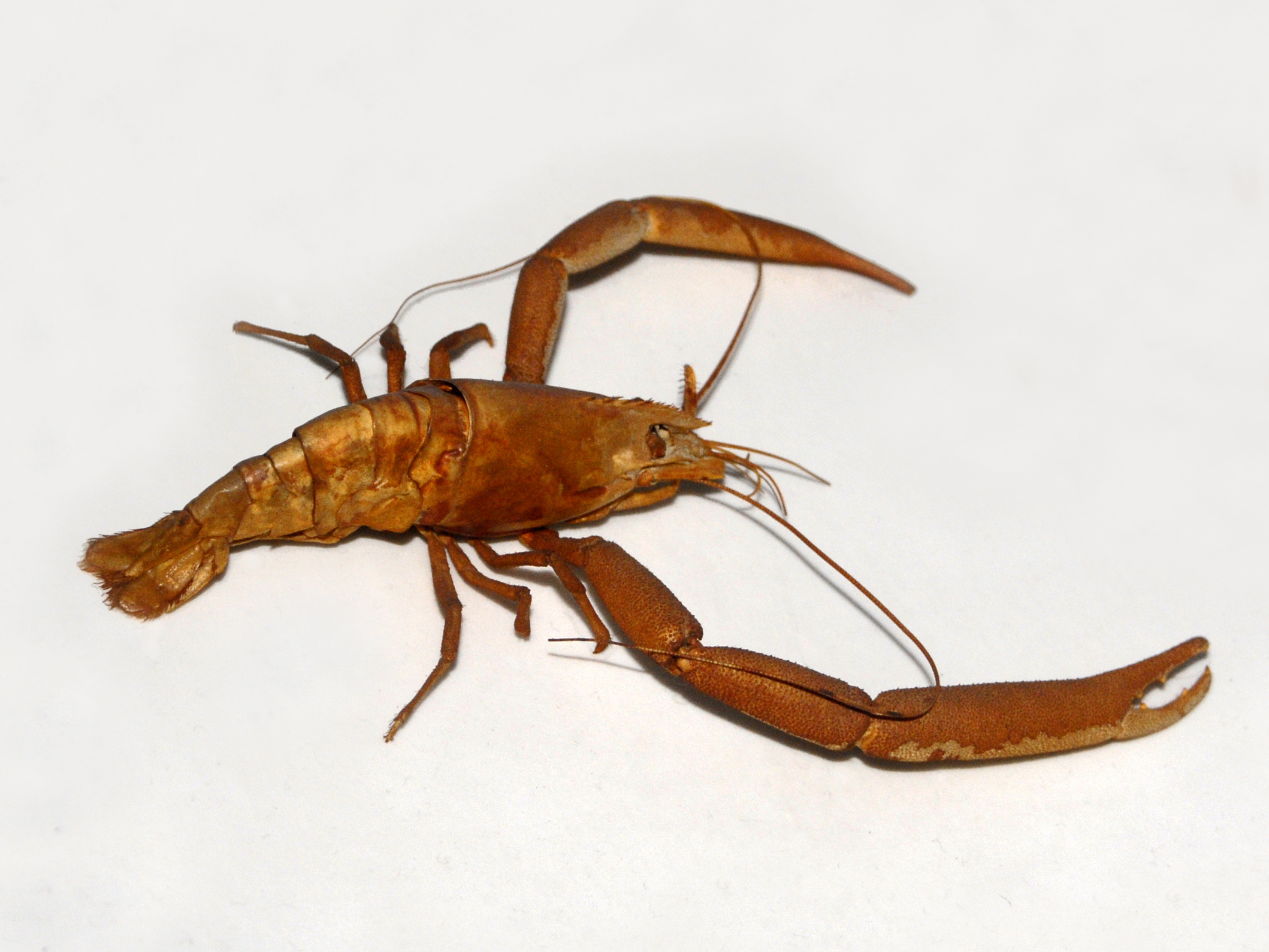
- Museum specimen

Conservation status
- Least Concern (IUCN 3.1)

Scientific classification
- Kingdom: Animalia
- Phylum: Arthropoda
- Class: Malacostraca
- Order: Decapoda
- Suborder: Pleocyemata
- Infraorder: Caridea
- Family: Palaemonidae
- Genus: Macrobrachium
- Species: M. formosense

Binomial name
- Macrobrachium formosense Spence Bate, 1868

Synonyms
- Palaemon riukiuensis Kubo, 1940; Palaemon similis Yu, 1931; Palemon longipes De Haan, 1849

= Macrobrachium formosense =

Species of crustacean

Macrobrachium formosense, the crane river prawn, is a species of freshwater shrimp in the family Palaemonidae. It lives in streams and rivers in Taiwan and southern Japan, including the Ryukyu Islands. Macrobrachium formosense reaches a carapace length of 10–20 millimetres (0.4–0.8 in).
