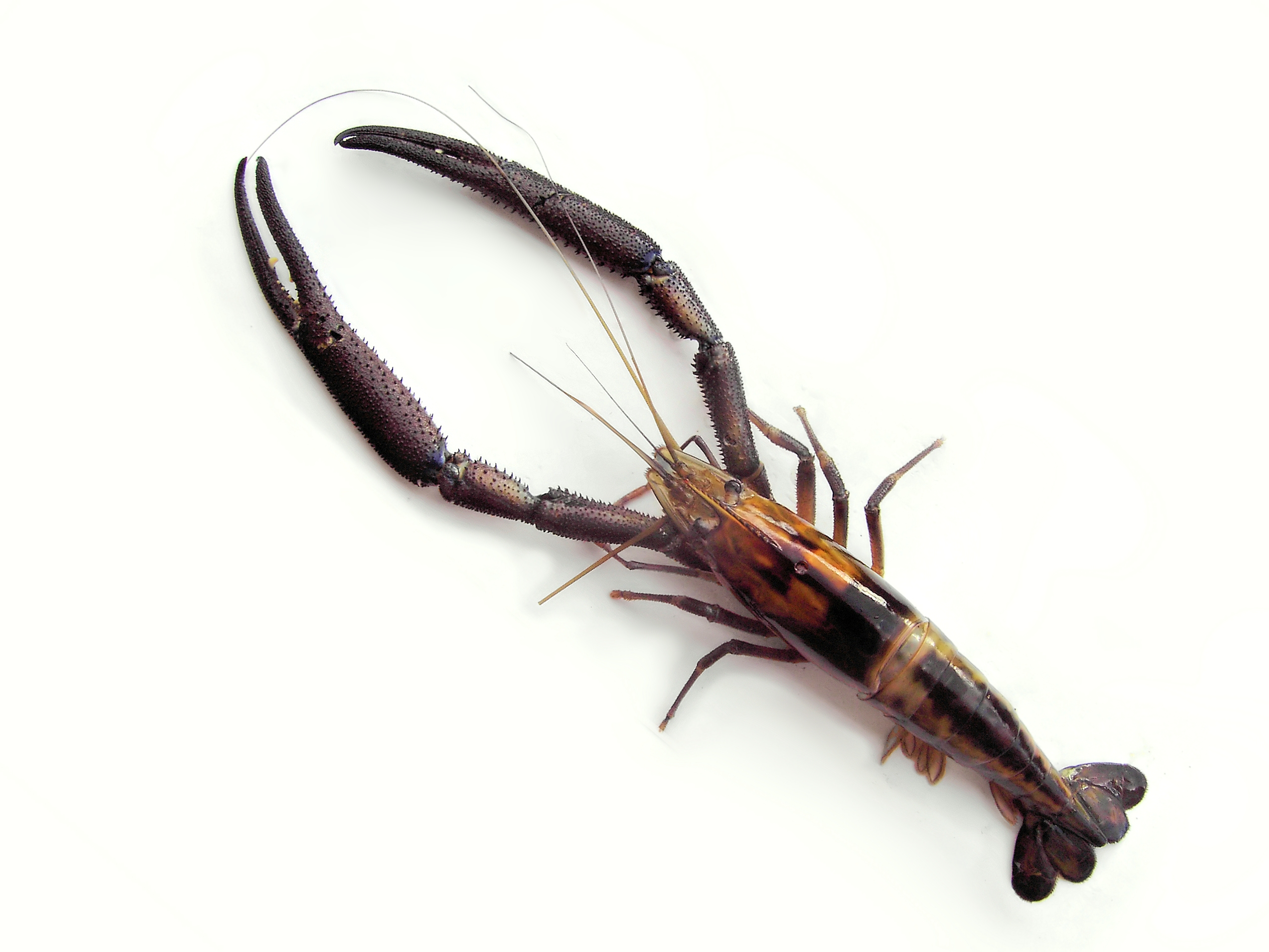

Conservation status
- Least Concern (IUCN 3.1)

Scientific classification
- Kingdom: Animalia
- Phylum: Arthropoda
- Clade: Pancrustacea
- Class: Malacostraca
- Order: Decapoda
- Suborder: Pleocyemata
- Infraorder: Caridea
- Family: Palaemonidae
- Genus: Macrobrachium
- Species: M. carcinus

Binomial name
- Macrobrachium carcinus (Linnaeus, 1758)

Synonyms
- Cancer (Astacus) jamaicensis Herbst, 1792; Cancer carcinus Linnaeus, 1758; Palaemon aztecus de Saussure, 1857; Palaemon brachydactylus Wiegmann, 1836; Palaemon carcinus (Linnaeus, 1758); Palaemon laminatus von Martens, 1869; Palaemon montezumae de Saussure, 1857; Palaemon ornatus Torralbas, 1917; Palemon brevicarpus De Haan, 1849; Palemon punctatus Randall, 1840; Periclimenes portoricensis Schmitt, 1933

= Macrobrachium carcinus =

Species of crustacean

Macrobrachium carcinus is a species of fresh water shrimp known as the big claw river shrimp. It is native to streams, rivers and creeks from Florida to southern Brazil. It is the largest known species of Neotropical freshwater shrimp, growing up to 30 centimetres (12 in) long and weighing as much as 850 grams (30 oz), although even larger specimens have been reported. It is an important species for commercial fishing in the Sao Francisco River basin, where it is known by the local name of pitu. M. carcinus is omnivorous, with a diet consisting of molluscs, small fish, algae, leaf litter and insects.

Macrobrachium carcinus has a tan or yellow body with dark brown stripes. Its chelae are unusually long and thin, to facilitate foraging for food in small crevices, and may be blue or green in color.
