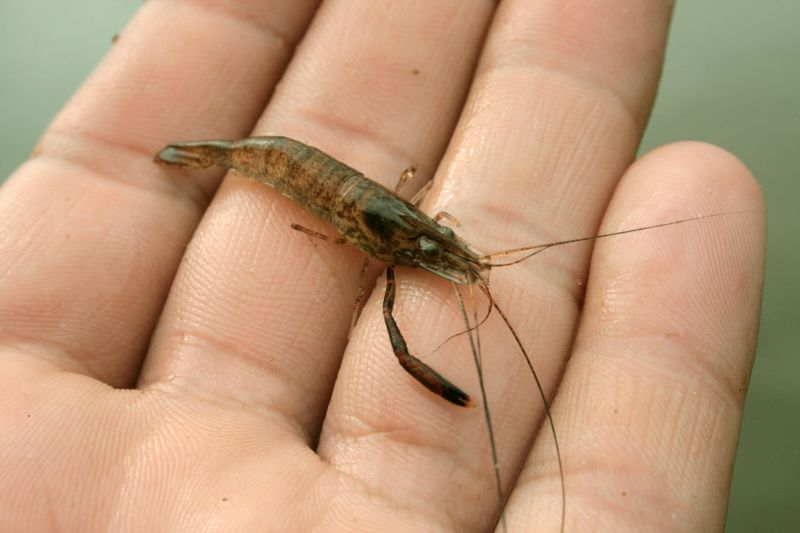

Conservation status
- Least Concern (IUCN 3.1)

Scientific classification
- Kingdom: Animalia
- Phylum: Arthropoda
- Clade: Pancrustacea
- Class: Malacostraca
- Order: Decapoda
- Suborder: Pleocyemata
- Infraorder: Caridea
- Family: Palaemonidae
- Genus: Macrobrachium
- Species: M. ohione

Binomial name
- Macrobrachium ohione (S. I. Smith, 1874)

Synonyms
- Palaemon ohionis Smith, 1874; Palaemon sallei Kingsley, 1883

= Macrobrachium ohione =

Species of crustacean

Macrobrachium ohione, commonly known as the Ohio shrimp, Ohio river shrimp or Ohio river prawn, is a species of freshwater shrimp found in rivers throughout the Gulf of Mexico and Atlantic Ocean drainage basins of North America. It is the best-known of all North American freshwater shrimp, and is commonly used as bait for commercial fishing, especially catfish.

== Description ==
Macrobrachium ohione is pale gray with small blue spots and grows up to 10 cm (4 in) long. Its first two pairs of legs are clawed, with the second pair larger than the first. The rostrum is curved and contains up to 13 teeth.

== Distribution ==
The species may be found from North Carolina to Florida on the Atlantic coast of North America, and from the southern tip of Missouri to Louisiana further westward. Despite the common name, the Ohio shrimp is not generally found in the Ohio River anymore. Until the 1930s, it was common in the Ohio River, with the type specimen having been taken at Cannelton, Indiana, and its range in the Mississippi River extended as far north as St. Louis, Missouri. Dams, interbasin transfer of water, and other human activities are thought to be the cause for the decrease in range.

In May 2001, two specimens were found in the Ohio River in Joppa, Illinois, the first ones in 50 years, indicating either that the species is returning to its former range, or that prior sampling methods were ineffective.

== Reproduction ==
Like other Macrobrachium species, the Ohio shrimp is amphidromous. The larvae must live in saltwater and move to fresh water as adults. This is accomplished by having the larvae drift, free-floating, down the river until they reach water where the salinity is high enough to support them. Females carrying eggs may also migrate downstream before releasing the larvae to reduce the time required for travel. A 2008 study by the University of Louisiana at Lafayette discovered that M. ohione larvae are viable for up to five days in fresh water. After this, the likelihood of their molting and surviving in saltwater is drastically diminished. The researchers concluded that dams and other human-erected barriers, by blocking the larval drift, are likely to be the primary reason that Ohio River shrimp are almost non-existent in the Ohio River.
