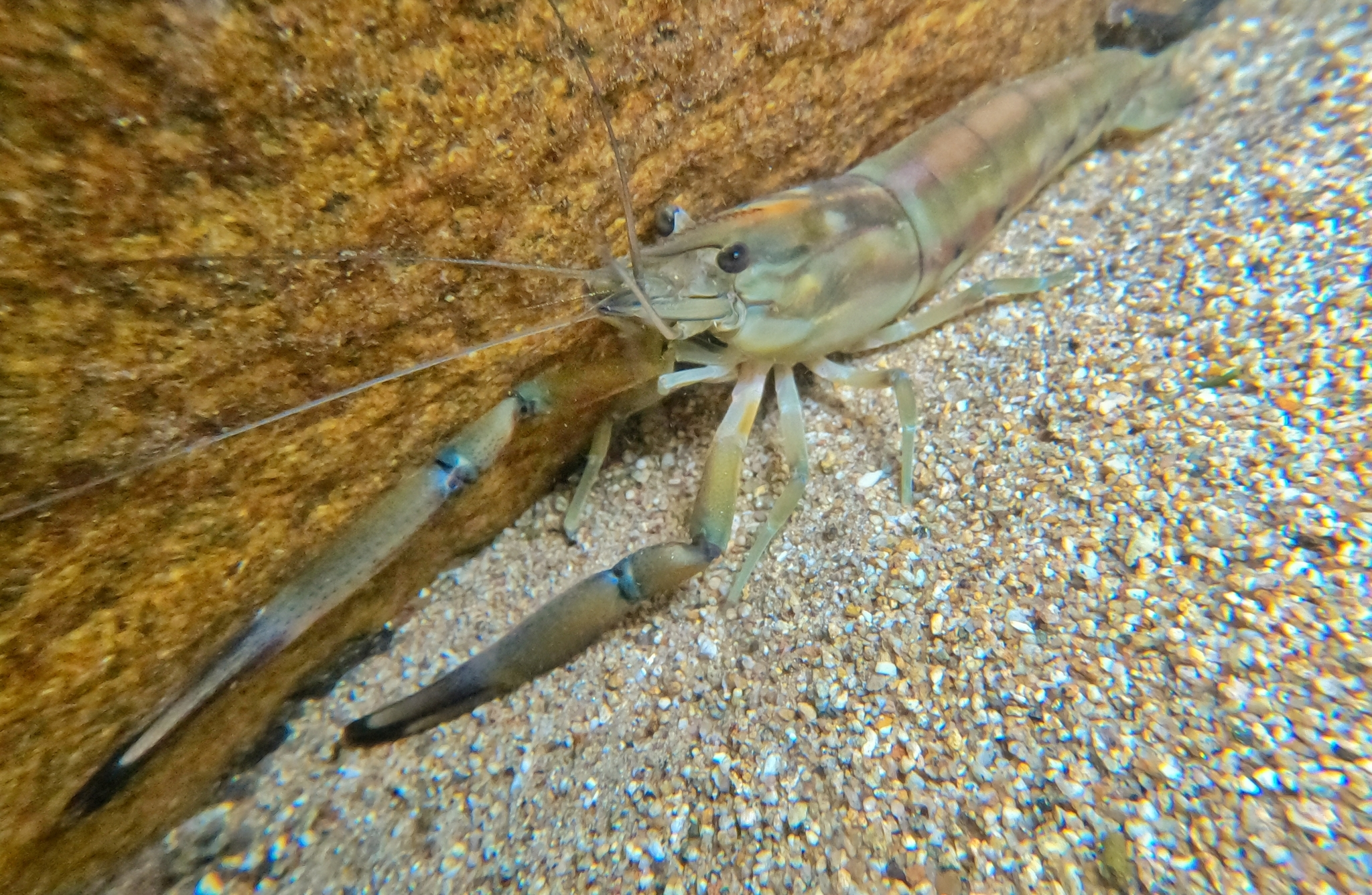
- Macrobrachium americanum, the type species
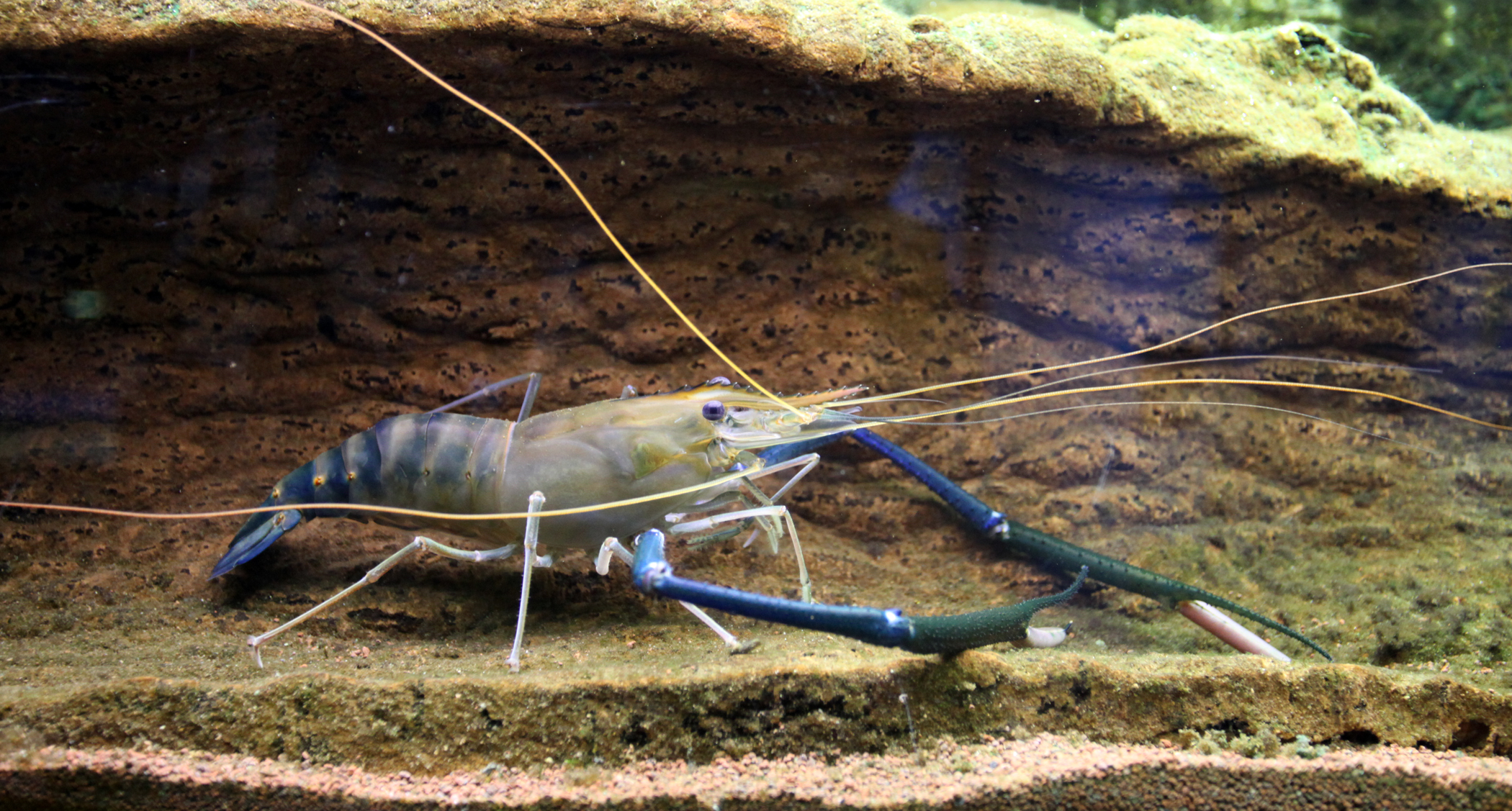
- Macrobrachium rosenbergii, the giant freshwater prawn, a commercially important species

Scientific classification
- Kingdom: Animalia
- Phylum: Arthropoda
- Clade: Pancrustacea
- Class: Malacostraca
- Order: Decapoda
- Suborder: Pleocyemata
- Infraorder: Caridea
- Family: Palaemonidae
- Genus: Macrobrachium; Spence Bate, 1868

Type species
- Macrobrachium americanum Bate, 1868

Synonyms
- List: Cryphiops Dana, 1852; Cryphiops (Cryphiops) Dana, 1852; Bithynis Philippi, 1860; Eupalaemon Ortmann, 1891; Palaemon (Eupalaemon) Ortmann, 1891; Palaemon (Macrobrachium); Palaemon (Parapalaemon) Ortmann, 1891; Parapalaemon Ortmann, 1891; Macroterocheir Stebbing, 1908; Pseudopalaemon Sollaud, 1911; Bithynops Holthuis, 1973; Cryphiops (Bithynops) Holthuis, 1973; Allobrachium Jayachandran, 2001

= Macrobrachium =

Genus of crustaceans

Macrobrachium is a genus of freshwater prawns or shrimps characterised by the extreme enlargement of the second pair of pereiopods, at least in the male. The genus is cosmopolitan, found throughout the tropical, freshwater and estuarine ecosystems of both the Old and New Worlds.

The genus has a difficult taxonomic history due to morphological conservation between its species (plesiomorphy), and conversely, variations within a single species (polymorphism), leading to the discovery of cryptic species which were only revealed through genetic analysis and morphometry. This polymorphism may be especially apparent among males, where it is termed heterogeneous individual growth (HIG); in males, this determines the size and morphology that they may grow into, as well as their physiology and behavior.

Many species of Macrobrachium are of high commercial value, especially the larger species such as those from the M. rosenbergii species group; these are both shrimped and cultivated throughout the world. Escapees of aquaculture operations have been found to have established breeding populations, though their ecological impact is little studied.

In addition to their commercial value, these crustaceans are thought to provide various ecosystem services to humans: a study in the Senegal River basin found that large dams have been implicated in the spread of schistosomiasis, a disease caused by Schistosoma flatworms carried by snails. In general, dams inhibit the reproduction and migration of various riverine species, including Macrobrachium spp.; as these prawns are "voracious" predators of snails in all life stages, damming has been linked to marked increases in human schistosomiasis around dammed areas. It is estimated that restoration of Macrobrachium populations could benefit around 300 million people, one third to one half of the at-risk population.

== Species ==
The family Palaemonidae has been revised extensively in the 21st century, including the genus Macrobrachium. Using molecular phylogenetics, some genera of palaemonid shrimp were found to be both polyphyletic and within the clade of Macrobrachium.

The following cladogram is based on a 2021 phylogenetic analysis using partial DNA fragments of palaemonid shrimp:

- ⊞Macrobrachium + Cryphiops
  ⊟
  - - - - - - Macrobrachium idae
            - Macrobrachium equidens
          - Macrobrachium latidactylus
        - - Macrobrachium australe
          - - - - Macrobrachium lar
                - Macrobrachium rosenbergii
              - Macrobrachium gracilirostre
            - - Macrobrachium latimanus
              - - Cryphiops caementarius
                - - - - - - - - Macrobrachium digueti
                              - Macrobrachium hobbsi
                            - Macrobrachium olfersii
                          - Macrobrachium faustinum
                        - Macrobrachium surinamicum
                      - - Macrobrachium hancocki
                        - Macrobrachium crenulatum
                    - - - Macrobrachium americanum
                        - Macrobrachium carcinus
                      - Macrobrachium vollenhoveni
                  - - - Macrobrachium heterochirus
                      - Macrobrachium ohione
                    - Macrobrachium occidentale
      - - - - - - - Macrobrachium acanthurus
                  - Macrobrachium tenellum
                - Macrobrachium amazonicum
              - Macrobrachium panamense
            - Macrobrachium dux
          - Macrobrachium jelskii
        - - - - - Cryphiops perspicax
                - Cryphiops sbordonii
              - Cryphiops luscus
            - - Macrobrachium tuxtlaense
              - Macrobrachium totonacum
          - Cryphiops villalobosi
    - - - - - Cryphiops brasiliensis
            - Macrobrachium iheringi
          - Macrobrachium potiuna
        - - Macrobrachium brasiliense
          - Macrobrachium nattereri
      - Macrobrachium borellii
  - - Macrobrachium ferreirai
    - Macrobrachium inpa
- Palaemon spp.

Usually, the oldest name still in use is prioritized (Principle of Priority), which would make Macrobrachium 1868 the junior synonym of Cryphiops 1852. Out of the interest of nomenclatural stability and to prevent taxonomic confusion, it was proposed to conserve the more speciose genus Macrobrachium, invoking ICZN Article 23.9.3.

The following cladogram is based on a 2025 phylogenetic study using sequenced genes of palaemonid shrimp:

- - - - Macrobrachium australiense
      - ⊞Macrobrachium spp.
        ⊟
        - - - - - - Macrobrachium faustinum
                  - Macrobrachium olfersii
                - Macrobrachium surinamicum
              - Macrobrachium crenulatum
              - Macrobrachium denticulatum
            - - - Macrobrachium americanum
                - Macrobrachium carcinus
              - - Macrobrachium heterochirus
                - Macrobrachium occidentale
          - - Macrobrachium jaroense
            - Macrobrachium placidum
        - - - Macrobrachium lar
            - Macrobrachium niphanae
          - Macrobrachium nipponense
      - ⊞Macrobrachium spp. + Pseudopalaemon
        ⊟
        - - - - Pseudopalaemon amazonensis
              - Pseudopalaemon chryseus
            - - - Macrobrachium acanthurus
                - Macrobrachium amazonicum
              - Macrobrachium jelskii
          - Macrobrachium perspicax
        - - - Macrobrachium ferreirai
            - Macrobrachium inpa
          - - - - Pseudopalaemon bouvieri
                - Macrobrachium borellii
              - Macrobrachium brasiliense
            - - Macrobrachium iheringi
              - Macrobrachium potiuna
    - ⊞Palaemon spp.
      ⊟
      - - Palaemon hancocki
        - Palaemon pandaliformis
      - - Palaemon ivonicus
        - Palaemon yuna
  - ⊞Palaemon spp.
    ⊟
    - - - Palaemon adspersus
        - Palaemon mexicanus
      - - Palaemon argentinus
        - Palaemon schmitti
    - Palaemon mercedae
- Palaemon concinnus

As of 2025, the genus contains these species:

- Macrobrachium acanthurus (Wiegmann, 1836)
- Macrobrachium acherontium Holthuis, 1977
- Macrobrachium aemulum (Nobili, 1906)
- Macrobrachium agwi Klotz, 2008
- Macrobrachium ahkowi Chong & Khoo, 1987
- Macrobrachium alevillalobosi Mantelatto, Pileggi, Pantaleão, Magalhães, Villalobos & Álvarez, 2021
- Macrobrachium altifrons (Henderson, 1893)
- Macrobrachium amazonensis (Ramos-Porto, 1979)
- Macrobrachium amazonicum (Heller, 1862)
- Macrobrachium americanum Spence Bate, 1868
- Macrobrachium amplimanus Cai & Dai, 1999
- Macrobrachium andamanicum (Tiwari, 1952)
- Macrobrachium aracamuni Rodríguez, 1982
- Macrobrachium asperulum (von Martens, 1868)
- Macrobrachium assamense (Tiwari, 1955)
- Macrobrachium atabapense Pereira S., 1986
- Macrobrachium auratum Short, 2004
- Macrobrachium australe (Guérin-Méneville, 1838)
- Macrobrachium australiense Holthuis, 1950
- Macrobrachium ayeyarwadiense Myo, Jayachandran & Khin, 2021
- Macrobrachium banjarae (Tiwari, 1958)
- Macrobrachium bariense (De Man, 1892)
- Macrobrachium bilineare Chen, Chen, Hu, Ma & Guo, 2021
- Macrobrachium birmanicum (Schenkel, 1902)
- Macrobrachium bombayense Almelkar & Sankolli, 2006
- Macrobrachium borellii (Nobili, 1896)
- Macrobrachium bouvieri (Sollaud, 1911)
- Macrobrachium brasiliense (Heller, 1862)
- Macrobrachium brevicarpum Tan & Dong, 1996
- Macrobrachium bullatum Fincham, 1987
- Macrobrachium cacharense (Tiwari, 1952)
- Macrobrachium caementarius (Molina, 1782)
- Macrobrachium caledonicum (Roux, 1926)
- Macrobrachium callirrhoe (De Man, 1898)
- Macrobrachium canarae (Tiwari, 1958)
- Macrobrachium candango Mantelatto, Pileggi, Pantaleão, Magalhães, Villalobos & Álvarez, 2021
- Macrobrachium carcinus (Linnaeus, 1758)
- Macrobrachium catonium Hobbs & Hobbs, 1995
- Macrobrachium cavernicola (Kemp, 1924)
- Macrobrachium cemai Tejeda-Mazariegos & Meijia-Ortiz, 2015
- Macrobrachium chainatense Saengphan, Panijpan, Senapin, Laosinchai, Ruenwongsa, Suksomnit & Phiwsaiya, 2019
- Macrobrachium chevalieri (J. Roux, 1935)
- Macrobrachium chilinense Đăng, 2012
- Macrobrachium chryseus (Kensley & Walker, 1982)
- Macrobrachium clymene (De Man, 1902)
- Macrobrachium cocoense Abele & Kim, 1984
- Macrobrachium cortezi Rodríguez, 1982
- Macrobrachium cosolapaense Mejía-Ortíz & López-Mejía, 2011
- Macrobrachium cowlesi Holthuis, 1950
- Macrobrachium crebrum Abele & Kim, 1989
- Macrobrachium crenulatum Holthuis, 1950
- Macrobrachium dalatense Nguyên, 2003
- Macrobrachium dayanum (Henderson, 1893)
- Macrobrachium debaratae Siriwut in Siriwut, Chaowvieng, Jeratthitikul, Chanabun, Panha & Sutcharit, 2025
- Macrobrachium denticulatum Ostrovski, da Fonseca & da Silva-Ferreira, 1996
- Macrobrachium depressimanum Pereira S., 1993
- Macrobrachium dienbienphuense Đăng & Nguyên, 1972
- Macrobrachium dierythrum Pereira S., 1986
- Macrobrachium digitus Abele & Kim, 1989
- Macrobrachium digueti (Bouvier, 1895)
- Macrobrachium dolatum Cai, Naiyanetr & Ng, 2004
- Macrobrachium dolichodactylus (Hilgendorf, 1879)
- Macrobrachium dongaoensis Chen, Chen & Guo, 2018
- Macrobrachium duanensis Lan, Wu & Li, 2017
- Macrobrachium duri Wowor & Ng, 2010
- Macrobrachium dux (Lenz, 1910)
- Macrobrachium edentatum Liang & Yan, 1986
- Macrobrachium elatum Jayachandran, 1987
- Macrobrachium elegantum Pan, Hou & Li, 2010
- Macrobrachium empulipke Wowor, 2010
- Macrobrachium equidens (Dana, 1852)
- Macrobrachium esculentum (Thallwitz, 1891)
- Macrobrachium faustinum (de Saussure, 1857)
- Macrobrachium felicinum Holthuis, 1949
- Macrobrachium ferreirai Kensley & Walker, 1982
- Macrobrachium feunteuni Keith & Vigneux, 2002
- Macrobrachium foai (Coutière, 1902)
- Macrobrachium forcipatum Ng, 1995
- Macrobrachium formosense Spence Bate, 1868
- Macrobrachium fukienense Liang & Yan, 1980
- Macrobrachium funchiae (García-Dávila & Magalhães, 2004)
- Macrobrachium gallus Holthuis, 1952
- Macrobrachium gangeticum Spence Bate, 1868
- Macrobrachium glabrum Holthuis, 1995
- Macrobrachium gouldingi (Kensley & Walker, 1982)
- Macrobrachium gracilirostre (Miers, 1875)
- Macrobrachium grandimanus (Randall, 1840)
- Macrobrachium gua Chong, 1989
- Macrobrachium guangxiense Liang & Yan, 1981
- Macrobrachium guizhouense Jiang & Chen in Jiang, Zhou, Ma, Wang, Xie & Chen, 2025
- Macrobrachium gurudeve Jayachandran & Raji, 2005
- Macrobrachium hainanense (Parisi, 1919)
- Macrobrachium hancocki Holthuis, 1950
- Macrobrachium handschini (Roux, 1933)
- Macrobrachium hendersodayanum (Tiwari, 1952)
- Macrobrachium hendersoni (De Man, 1906)
- Macrobrachium heterochirus (Wiegmann, 1836)
- Macrobrachium heterorhynchos Guo & He, 2008
- Macrobrachium hildebrandti (Hilgendorf, 1893)
- Macrobrachium hirsutimanus (Tiwari, 1952)
- Macrobrachium hirtimanus (Olivier, 1811)
- Macrobrachium hobbsi Nates & Villalobos in Villalobos Hiriart & Nates Rodriguez, 1990
- Macrobrachium horstii (De Man, 1892)
- Macrobrachium hungi Nguyên, 2012
- Macrobrachium idae (Heller, 1862)
- Macrobrachium idella (Hilgendorf, 1898)
- Macrobrachium iheringi (Ortmann, 1897)
- Macrobrachium inca Holthuis, 1950
- Macrobrachium indianum Pillai, Unnikrishnan & Prasannan, 2015
- Macrobrachium indicum Jayachandran & Joseph, 1986
- Macrobrachium inflatum Liang & Yan, 1985
- Macrobrachium inpa Kensley & Walker, 1982
- Macrobrachium insulare (Parisi, 1919)
- Macrobrachium iquitoensis (García-Dávila & Magalhães, 2004)
- Macrobrachium irwini Kunjulakshmi, Santos & Prakash, 2022
- Macrobrachium jacatepecense Mejía-Ortíz & López-Mejía, 2011
- Macrobrachium jacobsoni Holthuis, 1950
- Macrobrachium japonicum (De Haan, 1849)
- Macrobrachium jaroense (Cowles, 1914)
- Macrobrachium jayasreei Jayachandran & Raji, 2005
- Macrobrachium jelskii (Miers, 1878)
- Macrobrachium jiangxiense Liang & Yan, 1985
- Macrobrachium johnsoni Ravindranath, 1979
- Macrobrachium joppae Holthuis, 1950
- Macrobrachium kelianense Wowor & Short, 2007
- Macrobrachium kempi (Tiwari, 1949)
- Macrobrachium kistnense (Tiwari, 1952)
- Macrobrachium koombooloomba Short, 2004
- Macrobrachium koreana Kwon & Han, 1984
- Macrobrachium kulkarnii Almelkar & Sankolli, 2006
- Macrobrachium kunjuramani Jayachandran & Raji, 2005
- Macrobrachium laevis Zheng, Chen & Guo, 2019
- Macrobrachium lamarrei (H. Milne Edwards, 1837)
- Macrobrachium lanatum Cai & Ng, 2002
- Macrobrachium lanceifrons (Dana, 1852)
- Macrobrachium lanchesteri (De Man, 1911)
- Macrobrachium lantau Chow, Chan & Tsang, 2022
- Macrobrachium lar (Fabricius, 1798)
- Macrobrachium latidactylus (Thallwitz, 1891)
- Macrobrachium latimanus (von Martens, 1868)
- Macrobrachium lehiai Kazmi & Kazmi, 2010
- Macrobrachium lepidactyloides (De Man, 1892)
- Macrobrachium lepidactylus (Hilgendorf, 1879)
- Macrobrachium leptodactylus (De Man, 1892)
- Macrobrachium leucodactylus Wowor & Choy, 2001
- Macrobrachium lingyunense (Li & Luo, 2001)
- Macrobrachium lopopodus Wowor & Choy, 2001
- Macrobrachium lorentzi (Roux, 1921)
- Macrobrachium lucifugum Holthuis, 1974
- Macrobrachium lujae (De Man, 1912)
- Macrobrachium luscus (Holthuis, 1973)
- Macrobrachium macrobrachion (Herklots, 1851)
- Macrobrachium maculatum Liang & Yan, 1980
- Macrobrachium madhusoodani Unnikrishnan, Pillai & Jayachandran, 2011
- Macrobrachium magalhaesi Carvalho, Silva, Mota & De Grave, 2025
- Macrobrachium malayanum (Roux, 1935)
- Macrobrachium malcolmsonii (H. Milne Edwards, 1844)
- Macrobrachium mammillodactylus (Thallwitz, 1891)
- Macrobrachium manipurense (Tiwari, 1952)
- Macrobrachium manningi Pereira & Lasso, 2007
- Macrobrachium mazatecum Mejía-Ortíz & López-Mejía, 2011
- Macrobrachium mekongense Đăng, 1998
- Macrobrachium meridionale Liang & Yan, 1983
- Macrobrachium mexicanum (de Saussure, 1857)
- Macrobrachium microps Holthuis, 1978
- Macrobrachium mieni Đăng, 1975
- Macrobrachium minutum (Roux, 1917)
- Macrobrachium miyakoense Komai & Fujita, 2005
- Macrobrachium moorei (Calman, 1899)
- Macrobrachium myanmarum Myo, Jayachandran & Khin, 2021
- Macrobrachium naiyanetri Siriwut in Siriwut, Jeratthitikul, Panha, Chanabun & Sutcharit, 2020
- Macrobrachium naso (Kemp, 1918)
- Macrobrachium nattereri (Heller, 1862)
- Macrobrachium natulorum Holthuis, 1984
- Macrobrachium neglectum (De Man, 1905)
- Macrobrachium nepalense Kamita, 1974
- Macrobrachium ngankeeae de Mazancourt, Marquet, Wowor & Keith, 2024
- Macrobrachium nigramnis (Kensley & Walker, 1982)
- Macrobrachium niloticum (Roux, 1833)
- Macrobrachium niphanae Shokita & Takeda, 1989
- Macrobrachium nipponense (De Haan, 1849)
- Macrobrachium nobilii (Henderson & Matthai, 1910)
- Macrobrachium novaehollandiae (De Man, 1908)
- Macrobrachium oaxacae Mejía-Ortíz & López-Mejía, 2011
- Macrobrachium oblitum Carvalho & De Grave, 2026
- Macrobrachium occidentale Holthuis, 1950
- Macrobrachium oenone (De Man, 1902)
- Macrobrachium ohione (Smith, 1874)
- Macrobrachium olfersii (Wiegmann, 1836)
- Macrobrachium oxyphilus Ng, 1992
- Macrobrachium palmopilosum Siriwut in Siriwut, Jeratthitikul, Panha, Chanabun & Sutcharit, 2020
- Macrobrachium panamense Rathbun, 1912
- Macrobrachium panhai Chaowvieng & Siriwut in Chaowvieng, Sutcharit, Chanabun, Srisonchai, Jeratthitikul & Siriwut, 2024
- Macrobrachium pantanalense Dos Santos, Hayd & Anger, 2013
- Macrobrachium parasintangense Nguyên, 2004 (nomen dubium)
- Macrobrachium parvum Jiang & Zhou in Jiang, Zhou, Ma, Wang, Xie & Chen, 2025
- Macrobrachium patheinense Phone & Suzuki, 2004
- Macrobrachium patsa (Coutière, 1899)
- Macrobrachium pectinatum Pereira S., 1986
- Macrobrachium peguense (Tiwari, 1952)
- Macrobrachium pentazona He, Gao & Guo, 2009
- Macrobrachium perspicax (Holthuis, 1977)
- Macrobrachium petersii (Hilgendorf, 1879)
- Macrobrachium petiti (Roux, 1934)
- Macrobrachium phongnhaense Do & Nguyen, 2014
- Macrobrachium pilimanus (De Man, 1879)
- Macrobrachium pilosum Cai & Dai, 1999
- Macrobrachium placidulum (De Man, 1892)
- Macrobrachium placidum (De Man, 1892)
- Macrobrachium platycheles Ou & Yeo, 1995
- Macrobrachium platyrostris (Tiwari, 1952)
- Macrobrachium poeti Holthuis, 1984
- Macrobrachium potiuna (Müller, 1880)
- Macrobrachium prachuapense Saengphan & Panijpan in Saengphan, Panijpan, Senapin, Laosinchai, Suksomnit & Phiwsaiya, 2021
- Macrobrachium praecox (Roux, 1928)
- Macrobrachium puberimanus Siriwut in Siriwut, Jeratthitikul, Panha, Chanabun & Sutcharit, 2020
- Macrobrachium pumilum Pereira S., 1986
- Macrobrachium purpureamanus Wowor, 1999
- Macrobrachium quelchi (De Man, 1900)
- Macrobrachium ramae Das, Pahari & Bhattacharya, 2021
- Macrobrachium raridens (Hilgendorf, 1893)
- Macrobrachium rathbunae Holthuis, 1950
- Macrobrachium reyesi Pereira S., 1986
- Macrobrachium rhodochir Ng, 1995
- Macrobrachium rodriguezi Pereira S., 1986
- Macrobrachium rogersi (Tiwari, 1952)
- Macrobrachium rosenbergii (De Man, 1879)
- Macrobrachium rostratum Wang, 1997
- Macrobrachium rostrolevatus Chaowvieng & Siriwut in Chaowvieng, Sutcharit, Chanabun, Srisonchai, Jeratthitikul & Siriwut, 2024
- Macrobrachium rude (Heller, 1862)
- Macrobrachium sabanus Ng, 1995
- Macrobrachium saengphani Saengphan, Panijpan, Senapin, Laosinchai, Suksomnit & Phiwsaiya, 2020
- Macrobrachium saigonense Nguyên, 2006
- Macrobrachium sankolli Jalihal & Shenoy in Jalihal, Shenoy & Sankolli, 1988
- Macrobrachium santanderensis Garcia-Perez & Villamizar, 2009
- Macrobrachium sbordonii Mejía-Ortíz, Baldari & López-Mejía, 2008
- Macrobrachium scabriculum (Heller, 1862)
- Macrobrachium scorteccii Maccagno, 1961
- Macrobrachium shahpuri Kazmi & Kazmi, 2010
- Macrobrachium shaoi Cai & Jeng, 2001
- Macrobrachium shokitai Fujino & Baba, 1973
- Macrobrachium sintangense (De Man, 1898)
- Macrobrachium sirindhorn Naiyanetr, 2001
- Macrobrachium siwalikense (Tiwari, 1952)
- Macrobrachium snpurii Pillai & Unnikrishnan, 2013
- Macrobrachium sollaudii (De Man, 1912)
- Macrobrachium spelaeus Cai & Vidthayanon, 2016
- Macrobrachium spinipes (Schenkel, 1902)
- Macrobrachium spinosum Cai & Ng, 2001
- Macrobrachium srilankense Costa, 1979
- Macrobrachium striatum Pillai, 1991
- Macrobrachium sulcatus (Henderson & Matthai, 1910)
- Macrobrachium sulcicarpale Holthuis, 1950
- Macrobrachium sundaicum (Heller, 1862)
- Macrobrachium suongae Nguyên, 2003
- Macrobrachium superbum (Heller, 1862)
- Macrobrachium suphanense Saengphan, Panijpan, Senapin, Laosinchai, Ruenwongsa, Suksomnit & Phiwsaiya, 2018
- Macrobrachium surinamicum Holthuis, 1948
- Macrobrachium talaiense Le, 2006
- Macrobrachium taunsii Kazmi & Kazmi, 2010
- Macrobrachium tenellum (Smith, 1871)
- Macrobrachium tenuipes Zhu, Chen, Zheng, Chen & Guo, 2020
- Macrobrachium tenuirostrum Wang, 1997
- Macrobrachium thai Cai, Naiyanetr & Ng, 2004
- Macrobrachium therezieni Holthuis, 1965
- Macrobrachium thuylami Nguyên, 2006
- Macrobrachium thysi Powell, 1980
- Macrobrachium tirmiziae Yaqoob & Kazmi in Kazmi & Kazmi, 2010
- Macrobrachium tiwarii Jalihal, Shenoy & Sankolli, 1988
- Macrobrachium tolmerum Riek, 1951
- Macrobrachium totonacum Mejía, Alvarez & Hartnoll, 2003
- Macrobrachium transandicum Holthuis, 1950
- Macrobrachium tratense Cai, Naiyanetr & Ng, 2004
- Macrobrachium trichodactylum Liang, Liu & Chen in Li, Liu, Liang & Chen, 2007
- Macrobrachium tuxtlaense Villalobos & Alvarez, 1999
- Macrobrachium unikarnatakae Jalihal, Shenoy & Sankolli, 1988
- Macrobrachium univmandalay Myo, Jayachandran & Khin, 2021
- Macrobrachium urayang Wowor & Short, 2007
- Macrobrachium ustulatum (Nobili, 1899)
- Macrobrachium valdonii Mantelatto, Pileggi, Pantaleão, Magalhães, Villalobos & Álvarez, 2021
- Macrobrachium veliense Jayachandran & Joseph, 1985
- Macrobrachium venustum (Parisi, 1919)
- Macrobrachium veredensis Rossi, Magalhães & Mantelatto in Rossi, Magalhães, Mesquita & Mantelatto, 2020
- Macrobrachium vicconi Román, Ortega & Mejía, 2000
- Macrobrachium vietnamiense Đăng in Đăng & Nguyên, 1972
- Macrobrachium villalobosi Hobbs, 1973
- Macrobrachium villosimanus (Tiwari, 1949)
- Macrobrachium vollenhovenii (Herklots, 1857)
- Macrobrachium walvanense Almelkar, Jalihal & Sankolli, 1999
- Macrobrachium wannanense Dai & Tan, 1993
- Macrobrachium weberi (De Man, 1892)
- Macrobrachium xmas Fujita, Davie & Ng, 2015
- Macrobrachium yui Holthuis, 1950
- Macrobrachium zariquieyi Holthuis, 1949
