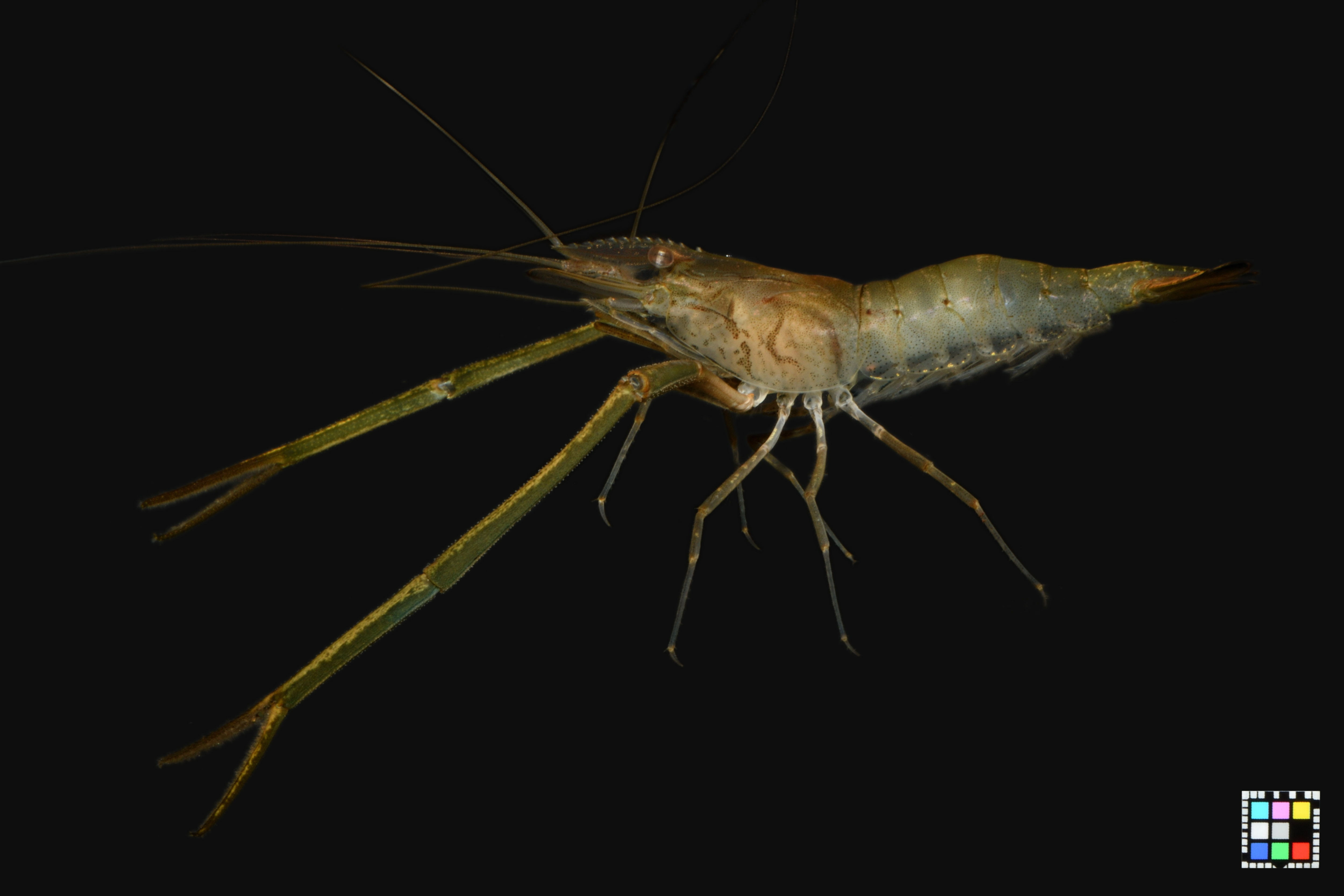

Scientific classification
- Kingdom: Animalia
- Phylum: Arthropoda
- Clade: Pancrustacea
- Class: Malacostraca
- Order: Decapoda
- Suborder: Pleocyemata
- Infraorder: Caridea
- Family: Palaemonidae
- Genus: Macrobrachium
- Species: M. nipponense

Binomial name
- Macrobrachium nipponense De Haan, 1849

= Oriental river prawn =

Species of crustacean

Oriental river prawn, or East Asian river prawn (Macrobrachium nipponense) is a species of freshwater shrimp found in Asia that was first described in 1849.

== Range ==
The natural range covers the delta areas and lower reaches of rivers in the Far East of Asia from Manchuria and Korea in the north to Vietnam and Myanmar in the south, including the Japanese archipelago and Taiwan.

=== Invasive range ===
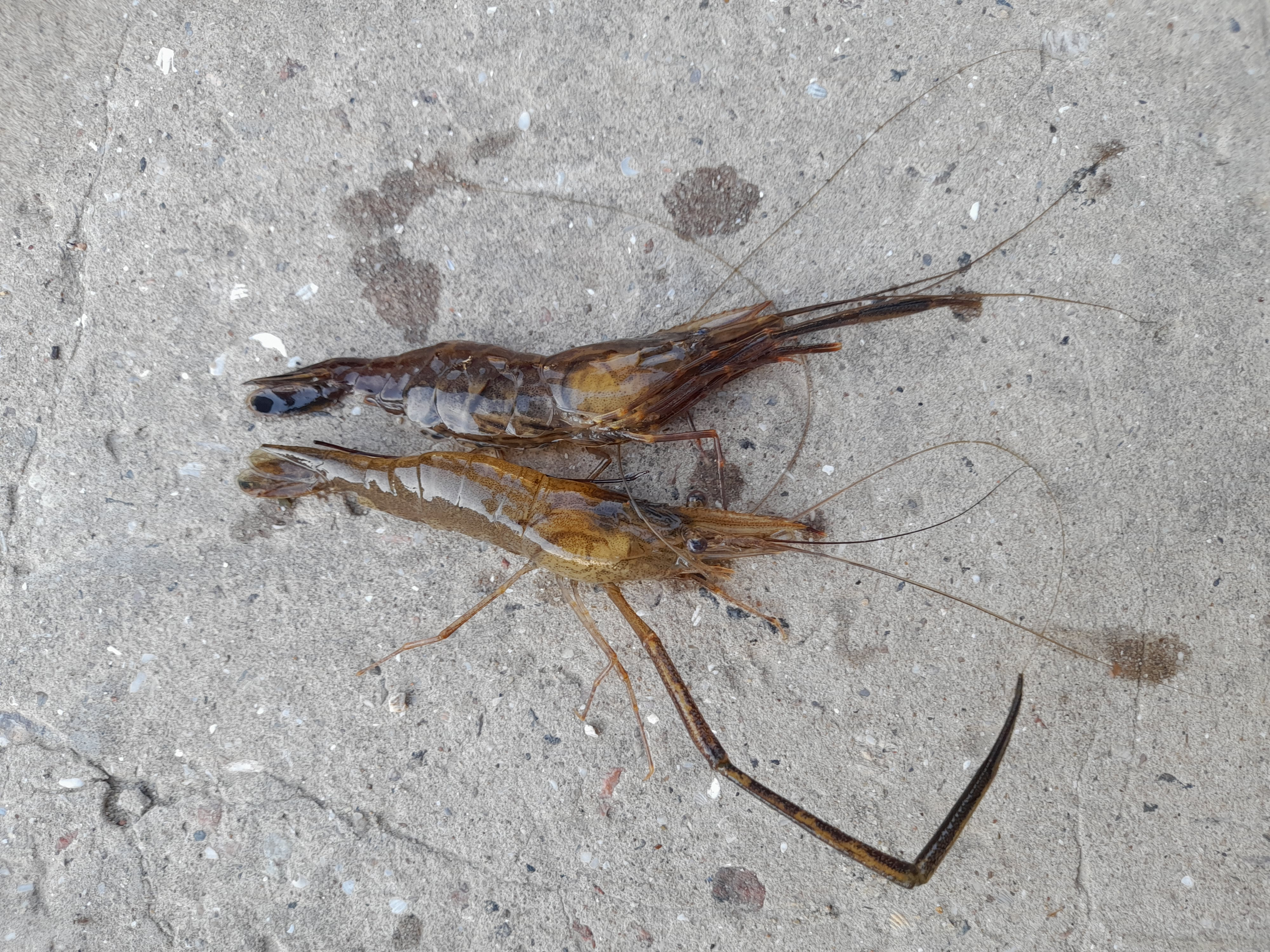
Oriental river prawn from the Danube delta, Ukraine

It was artificially introduced to Europe and Western Asia, leading to the formation of invasive populations. The invasive range covers Iran, Iraq, Dagestan, and the lower reaches of the Don River. In Europe, the Oriental river prawn occurs in the waters of Bulgaria, Germany, Hungary, Moldova, Romania and Ukraine. It was also introduced to the delta of the Guadalquivir River, Spain, through grain traffic from the Danube Delta to Western Europe.

== Biology ==
Inhabits waters with a wide range of salinity, perfectly adapting to fresh water. Complete adaptation to life in completely fresh water occurs within three generations. The prawn larvae have lower survival rates in fresh water than in brackish ones, preferring salinity levels of at least 3-10‰.
