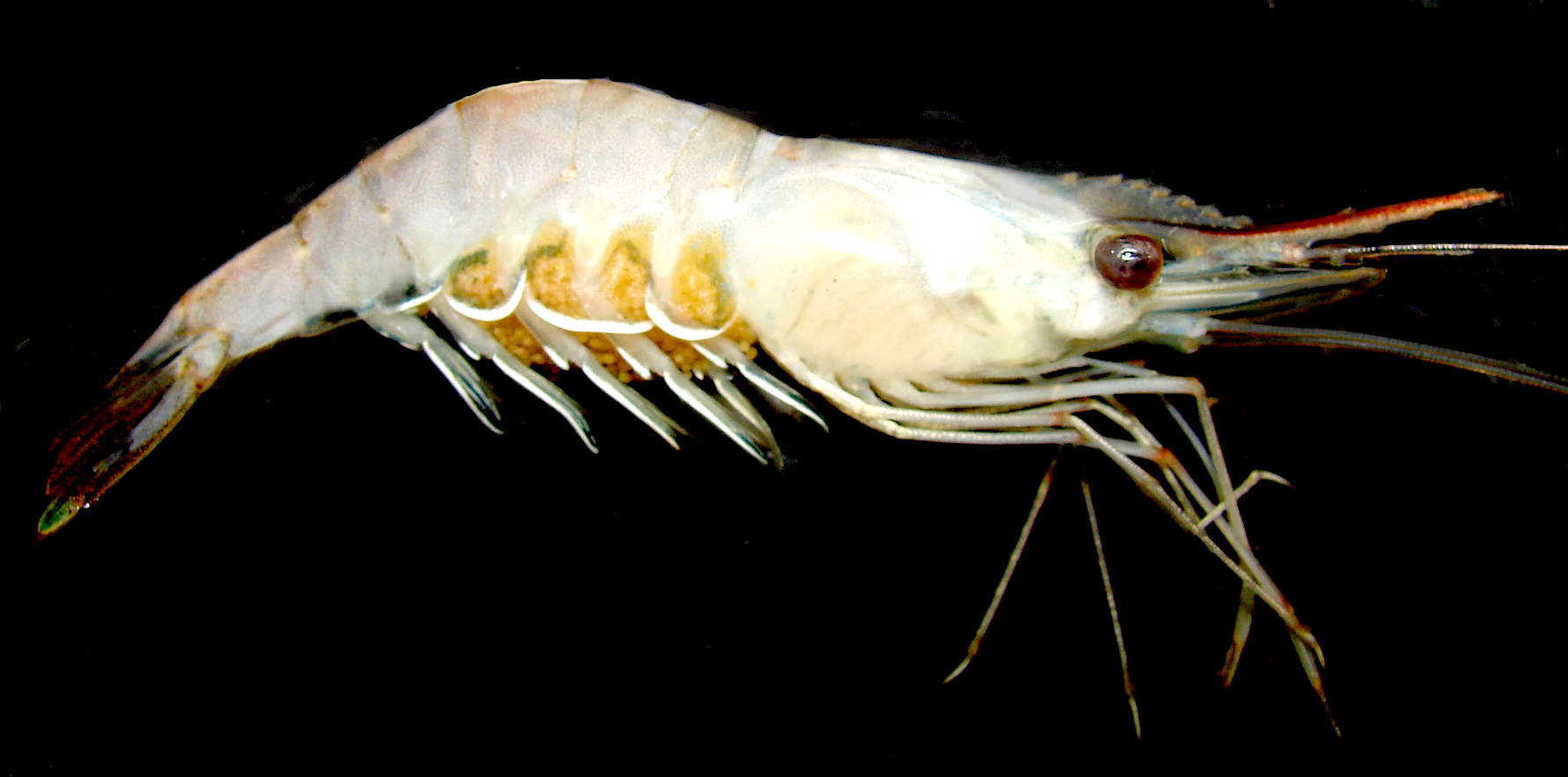

Conservation status
- Least Concern (IUCN 3.1)

Scientific classification
- Kingdom: Animalia
- Phylum: Arthropoda
- Class: Malacostraca
- Order: Decapoda
- Suborder: Pleocyemata
- Infraorder: Caridea
- Family: Palaemonidae
- Genus: Macrobrachium
- Species: M. amazonicum

Binomial name
- Macrobrachium amazonicum (Heller, 1861)

= Macrobrachium amazonicum =

Species of prawn

Macrobrachium amazonicum, also known as the Amazon river prawn, is an economically important species of palaemonid freshwater prawn. It is found throughout the tropical and subtropical areas of South America.

== Description ==
Macrobrachium amazonicum can grow to a length of 16 cm (6.3 in) and weight 30 g, with males on average larger than females.

Males occur in four distinct morphotypes. The smallest morphotype, known as translucent claw (TC) is mostly translucent, with a greenish tinge. In the second smallest, cinnamon claw (CC), the green tinge is more marked but there are several brownish spots on the claws that make them look beige. In the two largest morphotypes, named green claw 1 (GC1) and green claw 2 (GC2), the second pair of chelipedes is very large and has a moss green color. In GC2, the chelipedes are longer than the body. Similar morphotypes also occur in the giant river prawn, Macrobrachium rosenbergii.

== Distribution ==
Macrobrachium amazonicum is found in Guayana, Surinam, French Guiana, Brazil, Colombia, Venezuela, Peru, Ecuador, Bolivia, Paraguay and Argentina. It occurs in all the main eastern South American river basins, such as the Orinoco, Amazon, Araguaia-Tocantins, São Francisco, and La Plata. In the São Francisco river Basin it is likely an introduced species, but has become widespread in the past decades.

== Economic importance ==
Although the production of M. amazonicum in fisheries is still small, this species accounts for most of the Brazilian freshwater prawn wild harvest. It is an important food source for many traditional Amazonian communities of the Brazilian states of Pará and Amazonas and is also consumed by the population in general. In the São Francisco river, northeastern Brazil, it has been introduced probably around 1939 to serve as a food source for fish raised in local reservoirs. The impact of its introduction on native species is still unknown.
