= Freshwater shrimp =

Freshwater shrimp are any shrimp which live in fresh water.

This includes:

- Any Caridea (shrimp) which live in fresh water, especially the family Atyidae
- Species in the genus Macrobrachium

- Macrobrachium ohione, the Ohio River shrimp
- Macrobrachium carcinus, sometimes called the American giant freshwater prawn
- Macrobrachium rosenbergii, also known as the giant river prawn, giant freshwater prawn or cherabin

- Any amphipod living in fresh water, especially:

- Gammarus pulex
