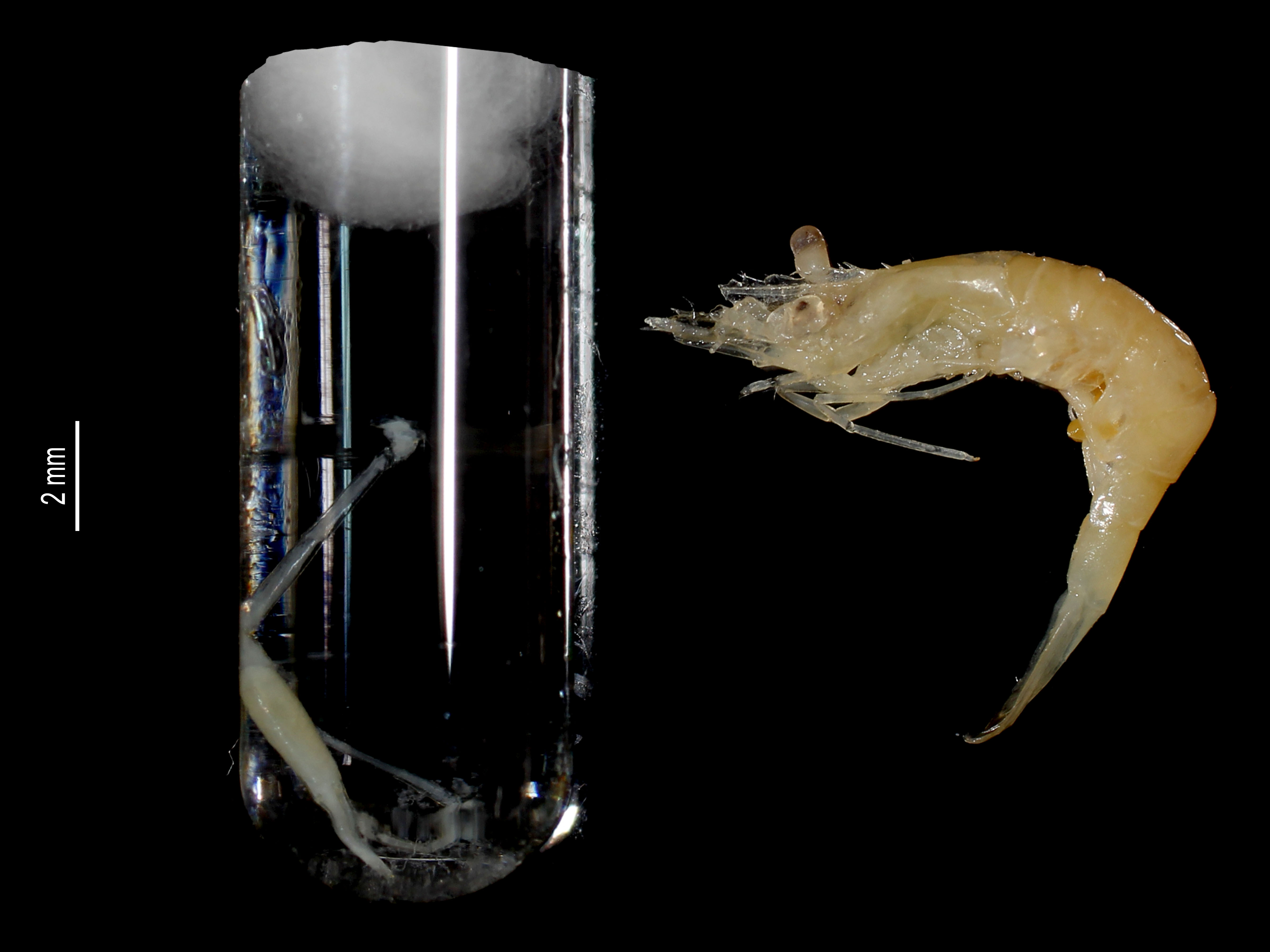
- Mesopontonia verrucimanus

Scientific classification
- Domain: Eukaryota
- Kingdom: Animalia
- Phylum: Arthropoda
- Class: Malacostraca
- Order: Decapoda
- Suborder: Pleocyemata
- Infraorder: Caridea
- Family: Palaemonidae
- Genus: Mesopontonia; Bruce, 1967

Type species
- Mesopontonia gorgoniophila Bruce, 1967

= Mesopontonia =

Genus of crustaceans

Mesopontonia is a genus of shrimp belonging to the palaemoniid subfamily Pontoniinae. It was first described in 1967 by Alexander James Bruce.

== Species ==
- Mesopontonia brevicarpus Li & Bruce, 2006
- Mesopontonia brucei Burukovsky, 1991
- Mesopontonia gorgoniophila Bruce, 1967
- Mesopontonia gracilicarpus Bruce, 1990
- Mesopontonia monodactylus Bruce, 1991
- Mesopontonia verrucimanus Bruce, 1996
