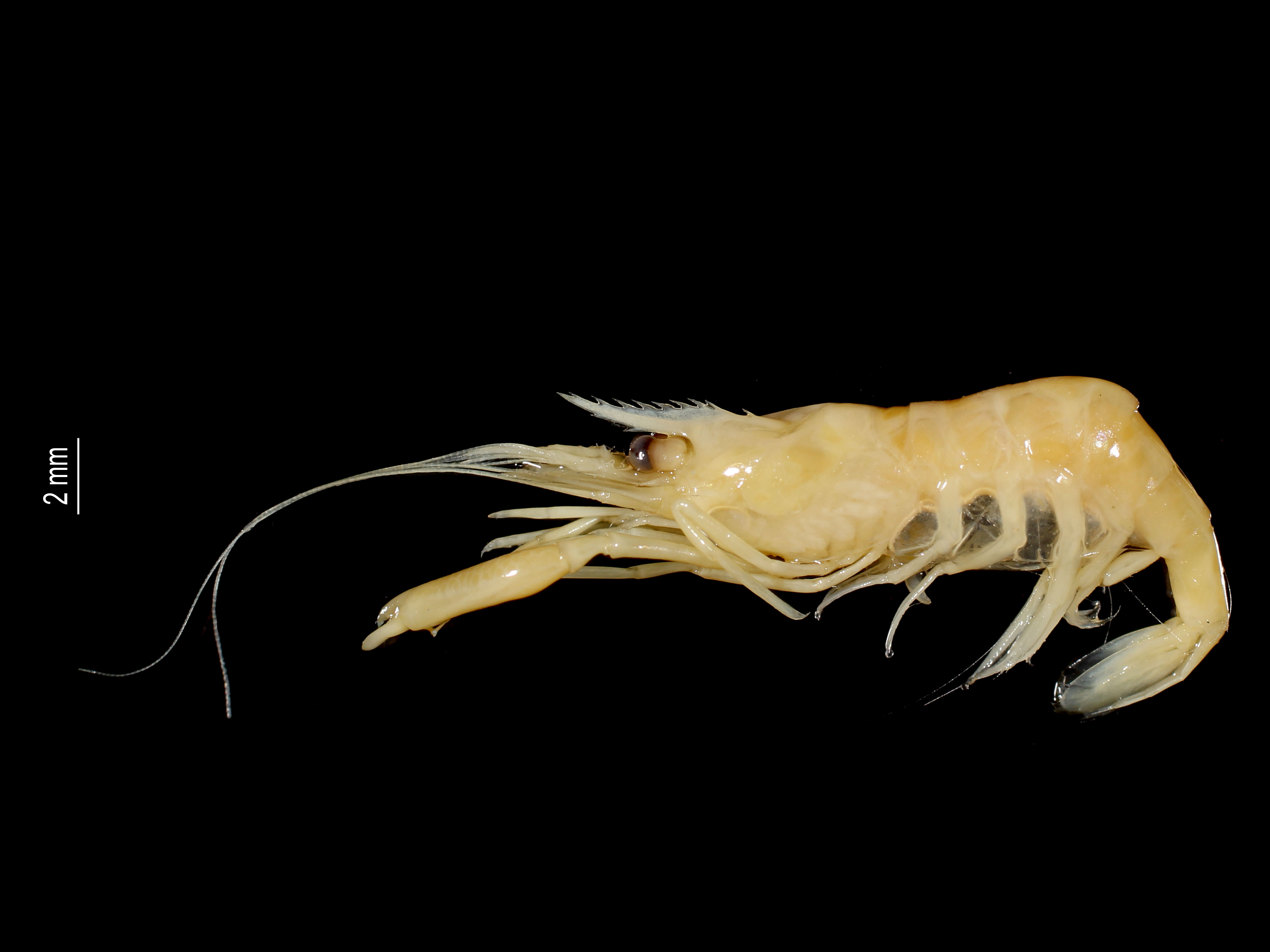

Scientific classification
- Domain: Eukaryota
- Kingdom: Animalia
- Phylum: Arthropoda
- Class: Malacostraca
- Order: Decapoda
- Suborder: Pleocyemata
- Infraorder: Caridea
- Family: Palaemonidae
- Genus: Mesopontonia
- Species: M. monodactylus

Binomial name
- Mesopontonia monodactylus Bruce, 1991

= Mesopontonia monodactylus =

Species of crustacean

Mesopontonia monodactylus is a species of shrimp in the family Palaemonidae that was first described in 1991.
