= Mesopontonia gorgoniophila =

Scientific classification
- Domain: Eukaryota
- Kingdom: Animalia
- Phylum: Arthropoda
- Class: Malacostraca
- Order: Decapoda
- Suborder: Pleocyemata
- Infraorder: Caridea
- Family: Palaemonidae
- Genus: Mesopontonia
- Species: M. gorgoniophila

Binomial name
- Mesopontonia gorgoniophila Bruce, 1967

Species of crustacean

Mesopontonia gorgoniophila is a species of shrimp in the family Palaemonidae that was first described in 1967 by Alexander James Bruce. The specific name, gorgoniophila, describes the species as being a lover of gorgonians, given because it is found amongst gorgonian corals.

It is found associated with gorgonian corals, at depths of 117–270 m, in the South China Sea and off the Queensland coast on continental shelves and on continental slopes.
