= List of crustaceans of Puerto Rico =

This is a list of crustaceans of Puerto Rico.

== List ==
- Atya innoccus (Innocous freshwater shrimp, gata chica, chágara)
- Atya lanipes (Spinning freshwater shrimp, chágara giradora)
- Atya scabra (Roughback freshwater shrimp, guábara, gata grande)
- Macrobrachium carcinus (Bigclaw river shrimp, camarón de Años, viejo)
- Macrobrachium crenulatum (Striped river shrimp, coyuntero del verde, rayao)
- Macrobrachium faustinum (Bigarm river shrimp, coyuntero, pelú, popeye)
- Macrobrachium heterochirus (Cascade river shrimp, camarón tigre, leopardo)
- Emerita portoricensis (Puerto Rican sand crab, cangrejo topo)
- Typhlatya monae
- Cardisoma guanhumi (blue land crab, juey común)
- Gecarcinus lateralis (blackback land crab, red land crab, jueyita de tierra, mona)
- Gecarcinus ruricola (purple land crab, black land crab, juey morao)
- Arenaeus cribrarius (Speckled swimming crab, cocolía marina, pecosa)
- Callinectes bocourti (Bocourt swimming crab, cocolía de Bocourt)
- Callinectes exasperatus (Rugose swimming crab, cocolía arrugada)
- Callinectes ornatus (Shelligs, cocolía adornada, jaiba)
- Callinectes sapidus (Blue crab, cocolía azul)
- Cardisoma guanhumi (Blue land crab, juey de tierra, juey azul, palanca)
- Carpilius corallinus (Batwing coral crab, juey dormido)
- Epilobocera sinuatifrons (Puerto Rican freshwater crab, buruquena, bruquena)
- Gecarcinus lateralis (Blackback land crab, jueyita de tierra)
- Gecarcinus ruricola (Purple land crab, juey morao, monita)
- Goniopsis cruentata (Mangrove root crab, juey de mangle, cangrejo)
- Mithrax spinosissimus (Channel clinging crab, cangrejo rey del Caribe)
- Ocypode quadrata (White ghost crab, cangrejo fantasma, jueya blanca)
- Ucides cordatus (swamp ghost crab, zambuco, cambú, juey pelú)

== See also ==
- Isla de Jueyes
- Maunabo Crustacean Festival
