= C. similis =

C. similis may refer to:

- Catocala similis, similar underwing, a moth of North America
- Callinectes similis, the lesser blue crab or dwarf crab, of the western Atlantic
