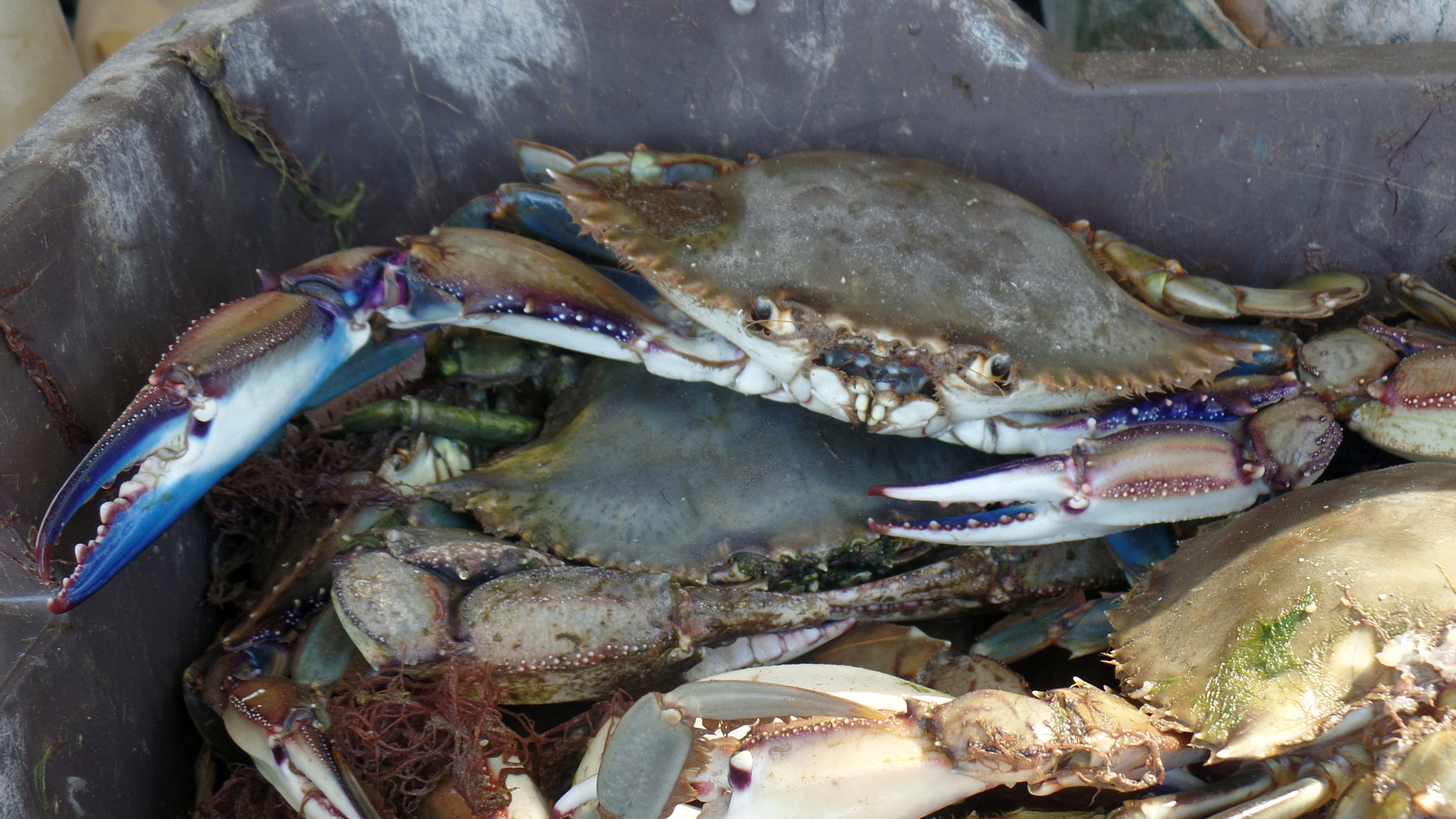

Scientific classification
- Domain: Eukaryota
- Kingdom: Animalia
- Phylum: Arthropoda
- Class: Malacostraca
- Order: Decapoda
- Suborder: Pleocyemata
- Infraorder: Brachyura
- Family: Portunidae
- Genus: Callinectes
- Species: C. bellicosus

Binomial name
- Callinectes bellicosus (Stimpson, 1859)

= Callinectes bellicosus =

Species of crab

Callinectes bellicosus is a species of swimming crab in the genus Callinectes. They are native to warm waters and shorelines in Mexico. They are prepared and eaten in the same manner as blue crabs.
