= Dwarf crab =

The common name dwarf crab may refer to several different species:

- Callinectes similis, the lesser blue crab
- Rhithropanopeus harrisii
