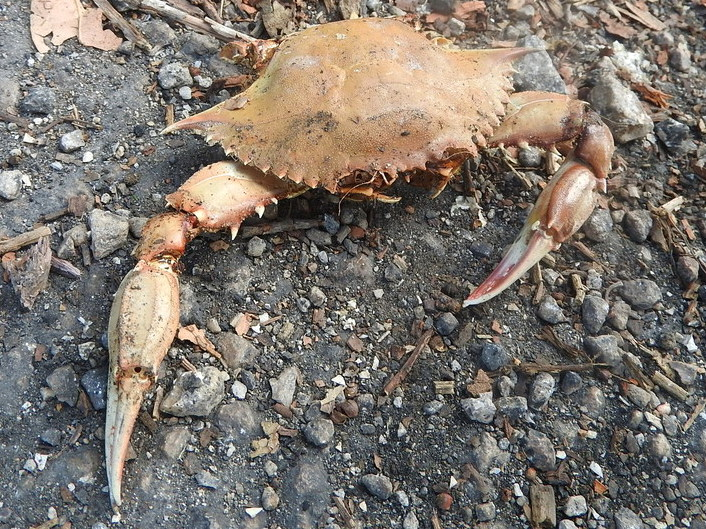

Scientific classification
- Kingdom: Animalia
- Phylum: Arthropoda
- Class: Malacostraca
- Order: Decapoda
- Suborder: Pleocyemata
- Infraorder: Brachyura
- Family: Portunidae
- Genus: Callinectes
- Species: C. rathbunae

Binomial name
- Callinectes rathbunae Contreras, 1930

= Callinectes rathbunae =

Species of crab

Callinectes rathbunae is a species of swimming crab. It occurs in warm coastal waters of Mexico. The species is not used as food, but is kept in laboratories for research. Young crabs can range from 17–64 millimetres (0.67–2.52 in) in size. The specific epithet rathbunae commemorates Mary J. Rathbun.
