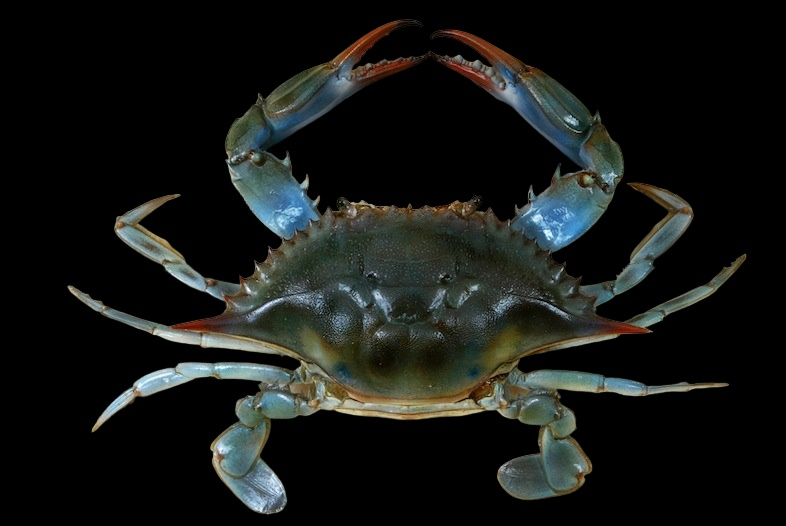
- Callinectes sapidus

Scientific classification
- Kingdom: Animalia
- Phylum: Arthropoda
- Clade: Pancrustacea
- Class: Malacostraca
- Order: Decapoda
- Suborder: Pleocyemata
- Infraorder: Brachyura
- Family: Portunidae
- Subfamily: Portuninae
- Genus: Callinectes; Stimpson, 1860

= Callinectes =

Genus of crabs

Callinectes (from Ancient Greek κάλλος (kállos), meaning "beautiful", and νήκτης (nḗktēs), meaning "swimmer") is a genus of crabs containing species such as the Atlantic blue crab C. sapidus.

== Species ==
Image	Scientific name	Common name	Distribution
	Callinectes affinis Fausto, 1980		Brazil
	† Callinectes alabamensis Rathbun, 1935		
	Callinectes amnicola (Rochebrune, 1883)		Cape Verde Islands and Mauritania to Angola.
	Callinectes arcuatus Ordway, 1863		Pacific coast of Central America.
	Callinectes bellicosus Stimpson, 1859		Mexico
	Callinectes bocourti A. Milne-Edwards, 1879		Jamaica and Belize south to Brazil
	Callinectes danae Smith, 1869		Brazil and the West Indies.
	† Callinectes declivis Rathbun, 1918		
	Callinectes exasperatus (Gerstaecker, 1856)	rugose swimming crab	western Atlantic Ocean.
	† Callinectes jamaicensis Withers, 1924		
	Callinectes larvatus Ordway, 1863		
	Callinectes marginatus (A. Milne-Edwards, 1861)		the Cape Verde Islands and Nouadhibou, Mauritania to Angola.
	Callinectes ornatus Ordway, 1863		western Atlantic Ocean, as well the Caribbean coastlines.
	Callinectes pallidus (Rochebrune, 1883)		Mauritania to Angola.
	† Callinectes paraensis Beurlen, 1958		
	† Callinectes quiloensis Verma, 1977		
	Callinectes rathbunae Contreras, 1930		warm coastal waters of Mexico.
	† Callinectes reticulatus Rathbun, 1918		
	Callinectes sapidus Rathbun, 1896	Chesapeake blue crab	western Atlantic Ocean and the Gulf of Mexico
	Callinectes similis Williams, 1966	lesser blue crab or dwarf crab	Western Atlantic Ocean, Caribbean Sea and Gulf of Mexico from the United States to Colombia.
	Callinectes toxotes Ordway, 1863		Eastern Pacific
