= Soft-shell crab =

Culinary term for molted crabs

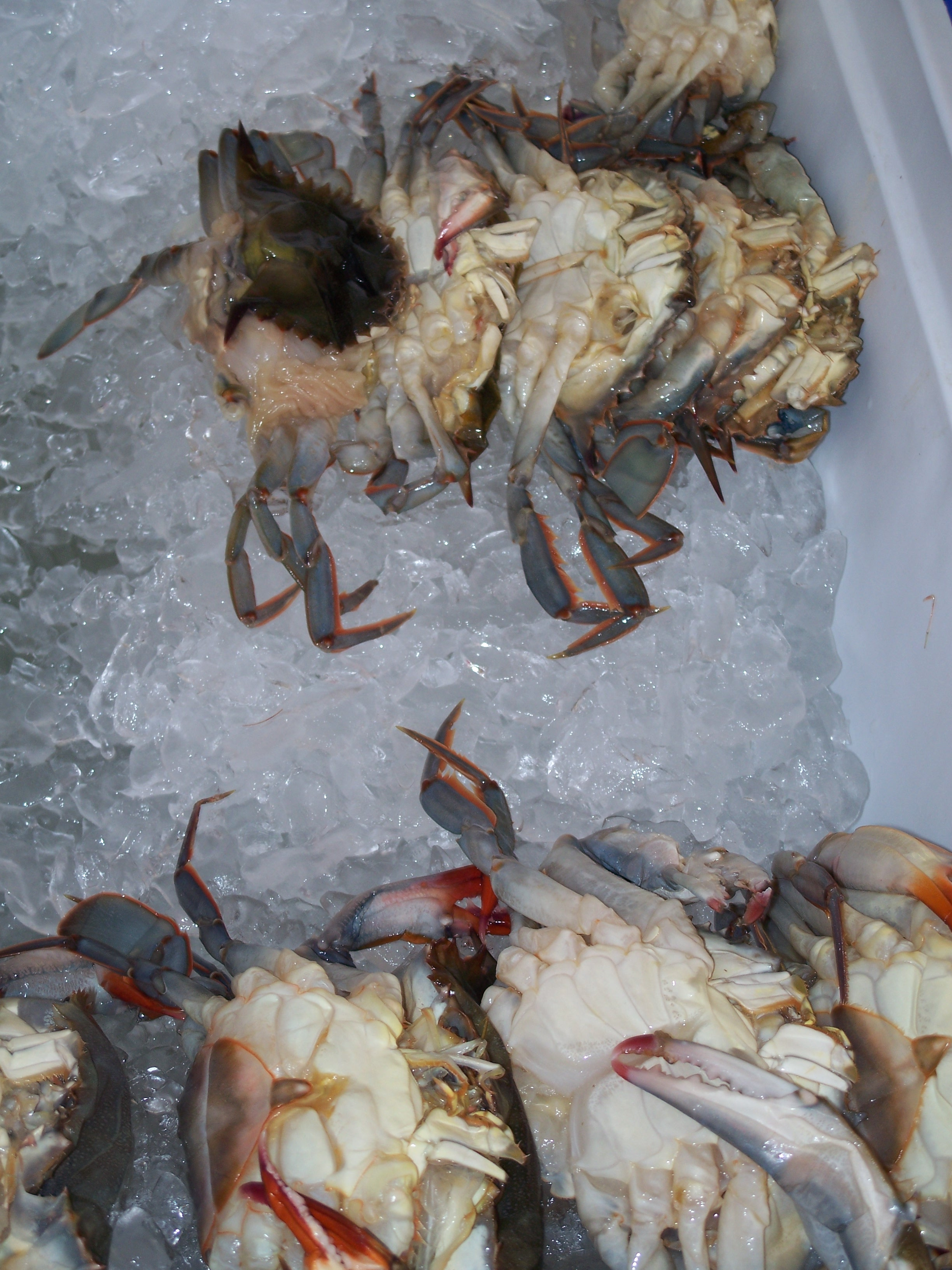
Soft-shelled blue crabs in New Orleans, Louisiana

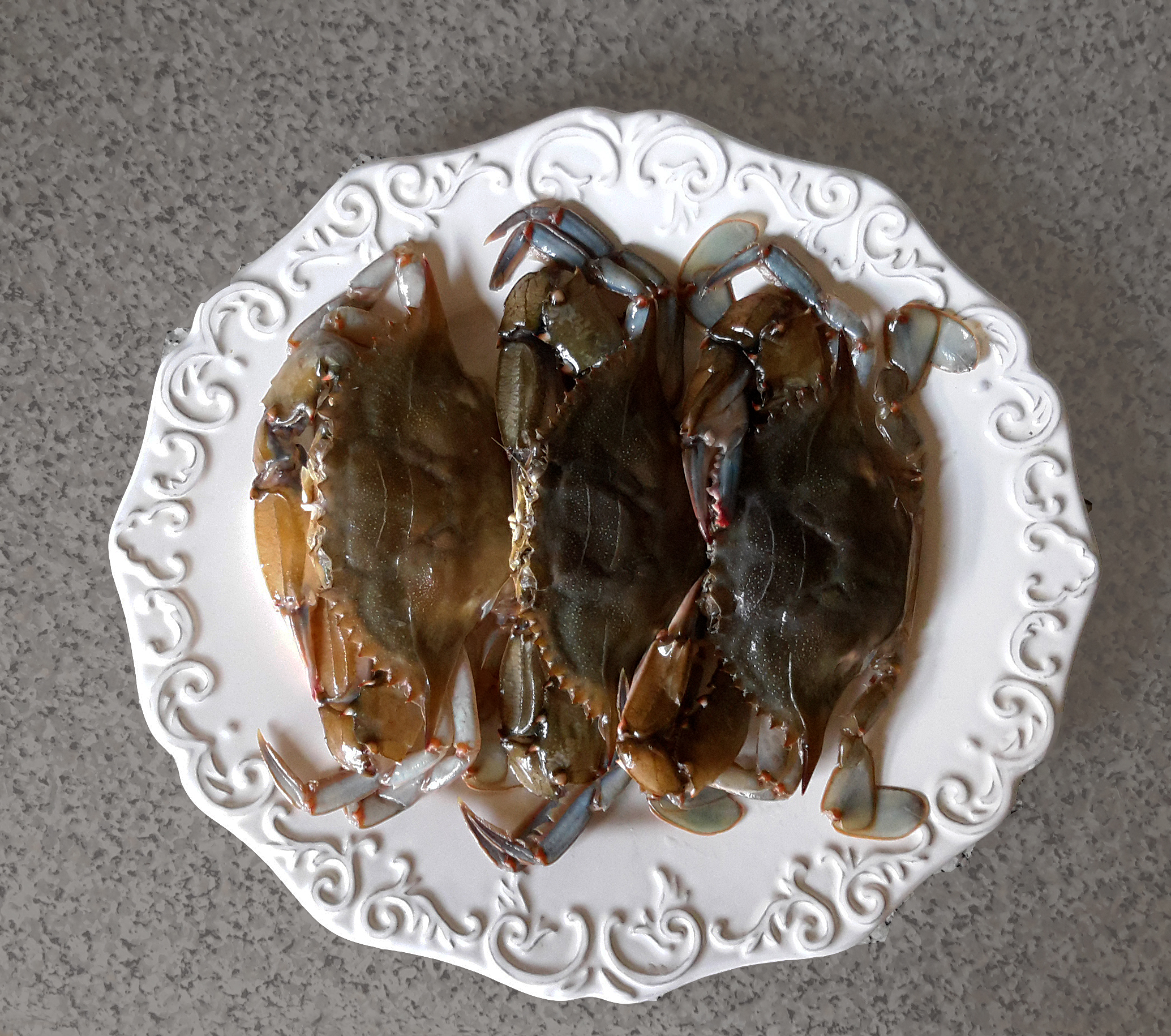
Three soft-shell crabs, ready for preparation, and cooking

Soft-shell crab is a culinary term for crabs that have recently molted their old exoskeleton and are still soft. Soft-shells are removed from the water as soon as they molt or, preferably, just before to prevent any hardening of their shell. Catching soft-shell crab is very time-sensitive and requires that any caught crabs be kept in climate-controlled areas immediately after catching until they molt, at which point they can be safely removed and sold.

This means that almost the entire animal can be eaten, rather than having to shell the animal to reach the meat. The exceptions are the mouthparts, the gills and the abdominal cover, which are discarded ("cleaned"). The remaining, edible part of the crab is typically deep-fried or sautéed.

== Regional cuisine ==
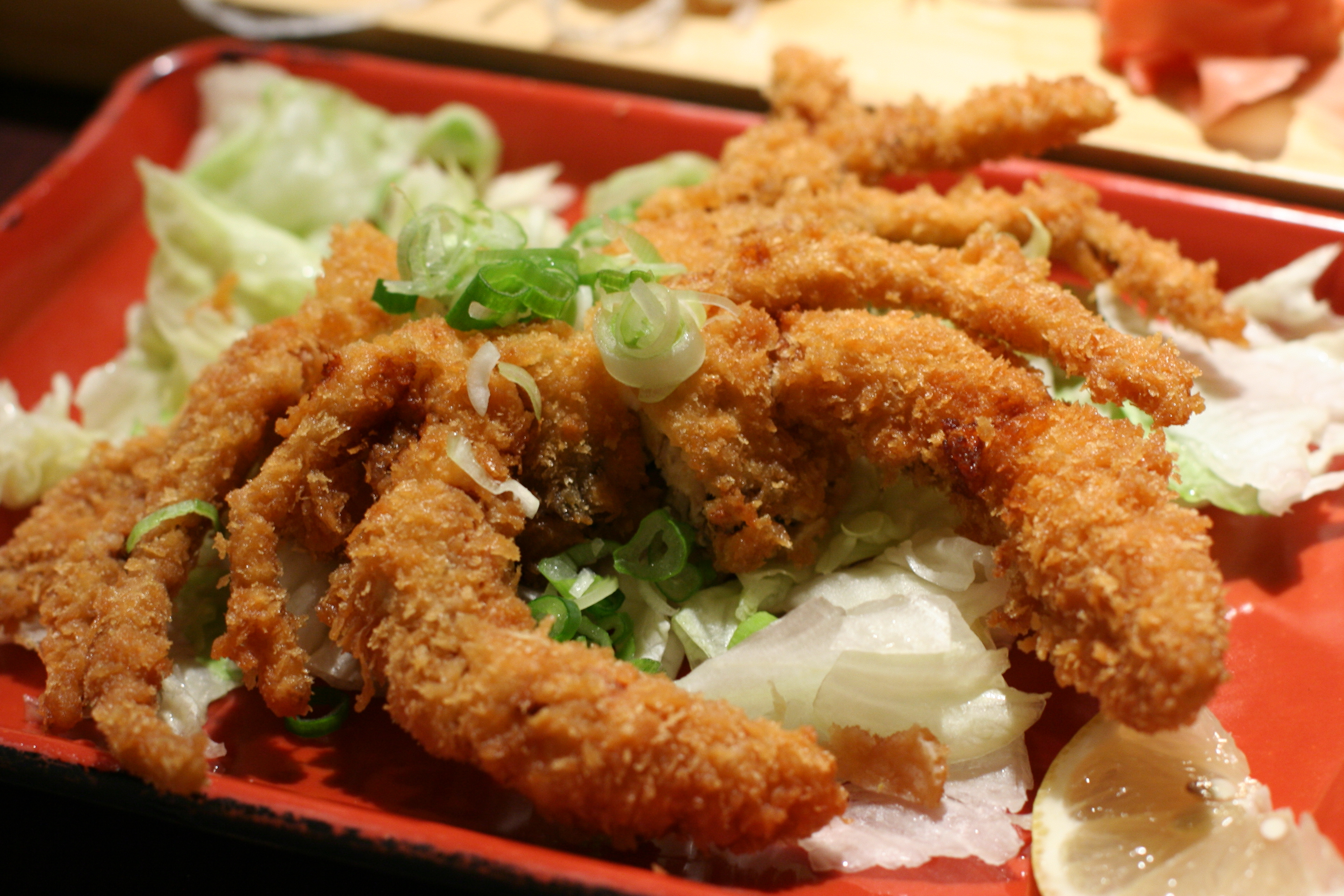
Fried soft-shell crab

In the United States, the main species is the blue crab, Callinectes sapidus, which appears in markets from April to September.

In the Deep South region of the United States, most notably the Gulf coasts of Louisiana, Mississippi, and Alabama, "Buster crab" can be a synonym for a plump, meaty soft-shell crab. However, the original meaning of Buster crab referred to either a soft-shell that had yet to complete molting, or to a soft-shell that had died before being provided to a seafood vendor and was then consumed quickly by the crabbers.

In Japan, various species are used to make sushi such as maki-zushi or temaki-zushi. The Japanese blue crab (Portunus trituberculatus) or the shore-swimming crab (Charybdis japonica) are typically used.

In Spain, soft-shell crustaceans are typical in the coastal region of Andalusia. Irrespective of the species, they are called chiguatos, from the local slang verb achiguatar, meaning to soften. Typical preparations include velvet crabs (Necora puber) and langoustines (Nephrops norvegicus), which are highly regarded delicacies of Sanlucar de Barrameda, and lobster (Homarus gammarus) (called langosta chiguata), which is typical along the coast of Málaga. Typically, they are deep-fried and served with a vinaigrette.

In Italy, the soft-shell of the common Mediterranean crab is a delicacy typical of the Venetian lagoon (called moeca or moeche in the local idiom).

Soft-shell crabs can have the soft organs along the dorsal cavity removed during cleaning, or they can be left in for consumption. In the latter case, along the U.S. Atlantic coast, the customer asks the vendor to leave "the mustard", referring to the yellow-orange color of the hepatopancreas, and the deep orange of the roe in a female crab.

== Gallery ==
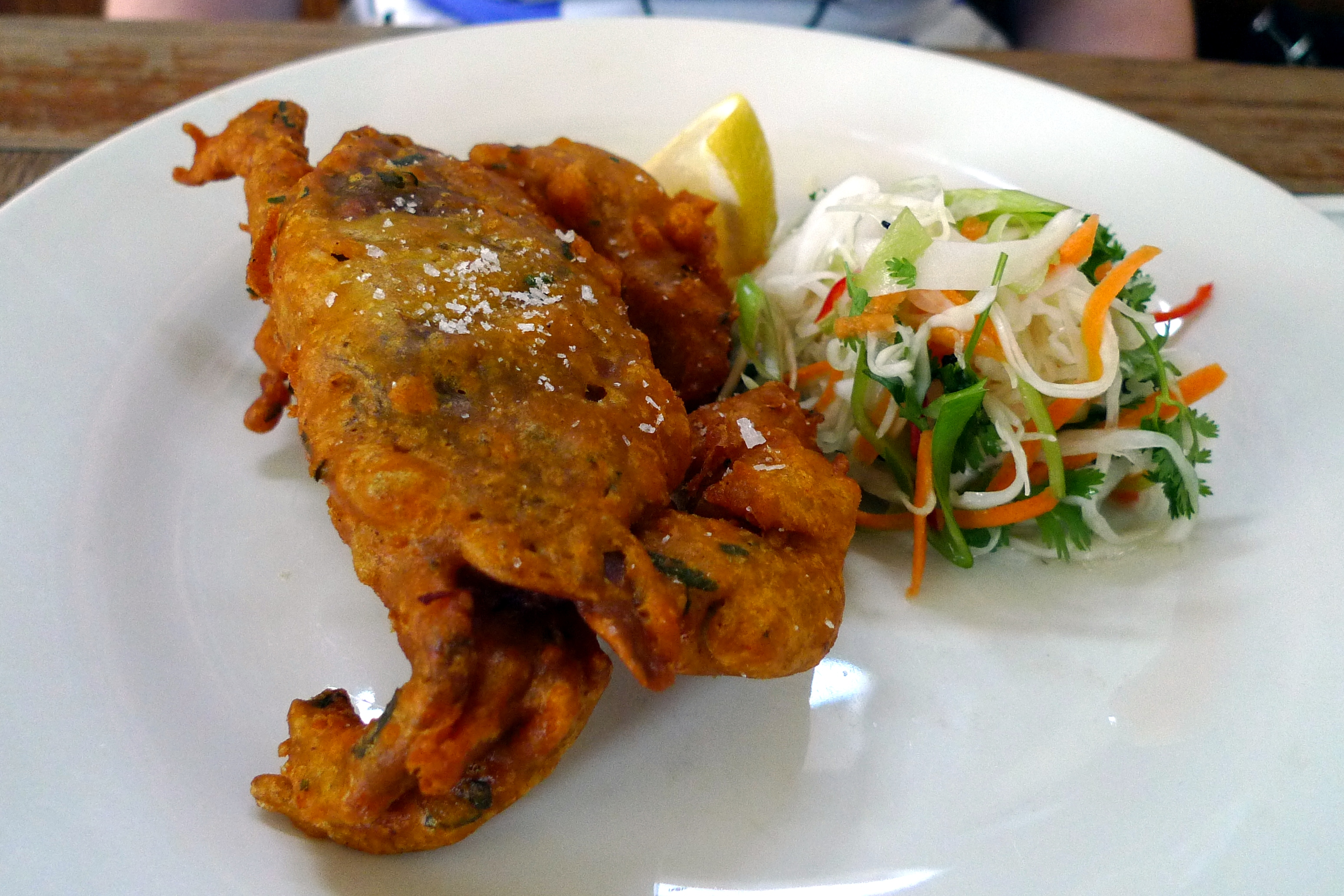

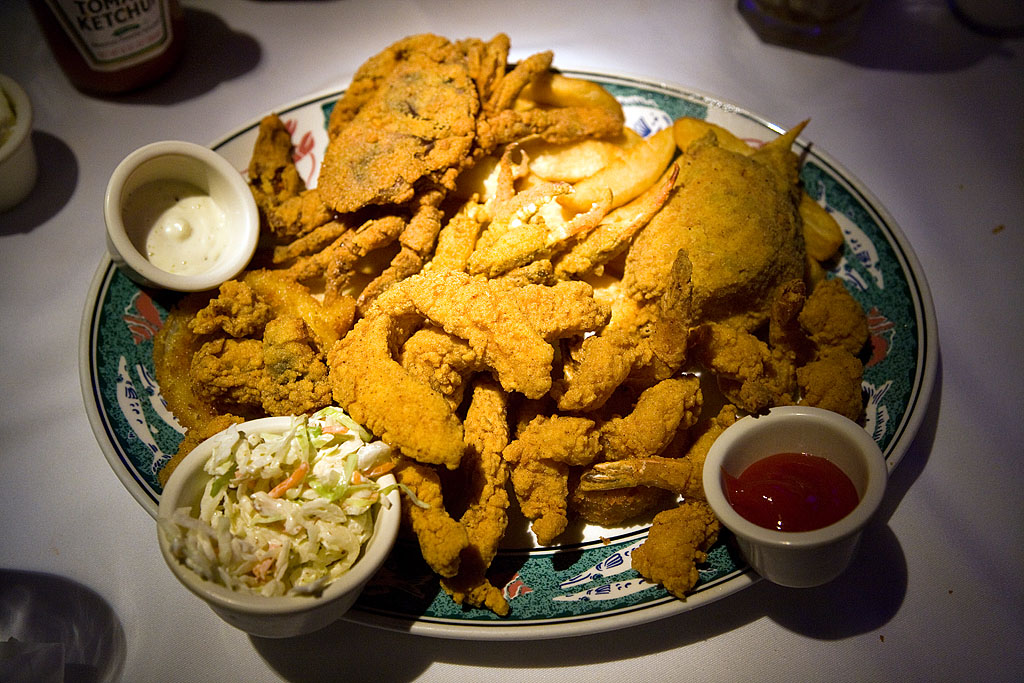

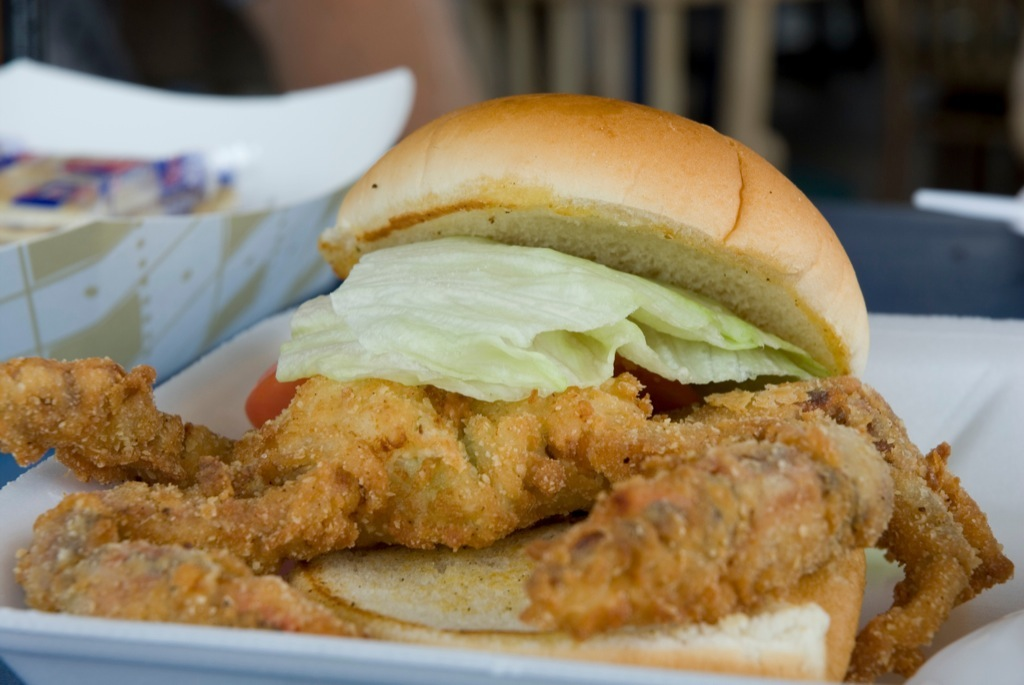

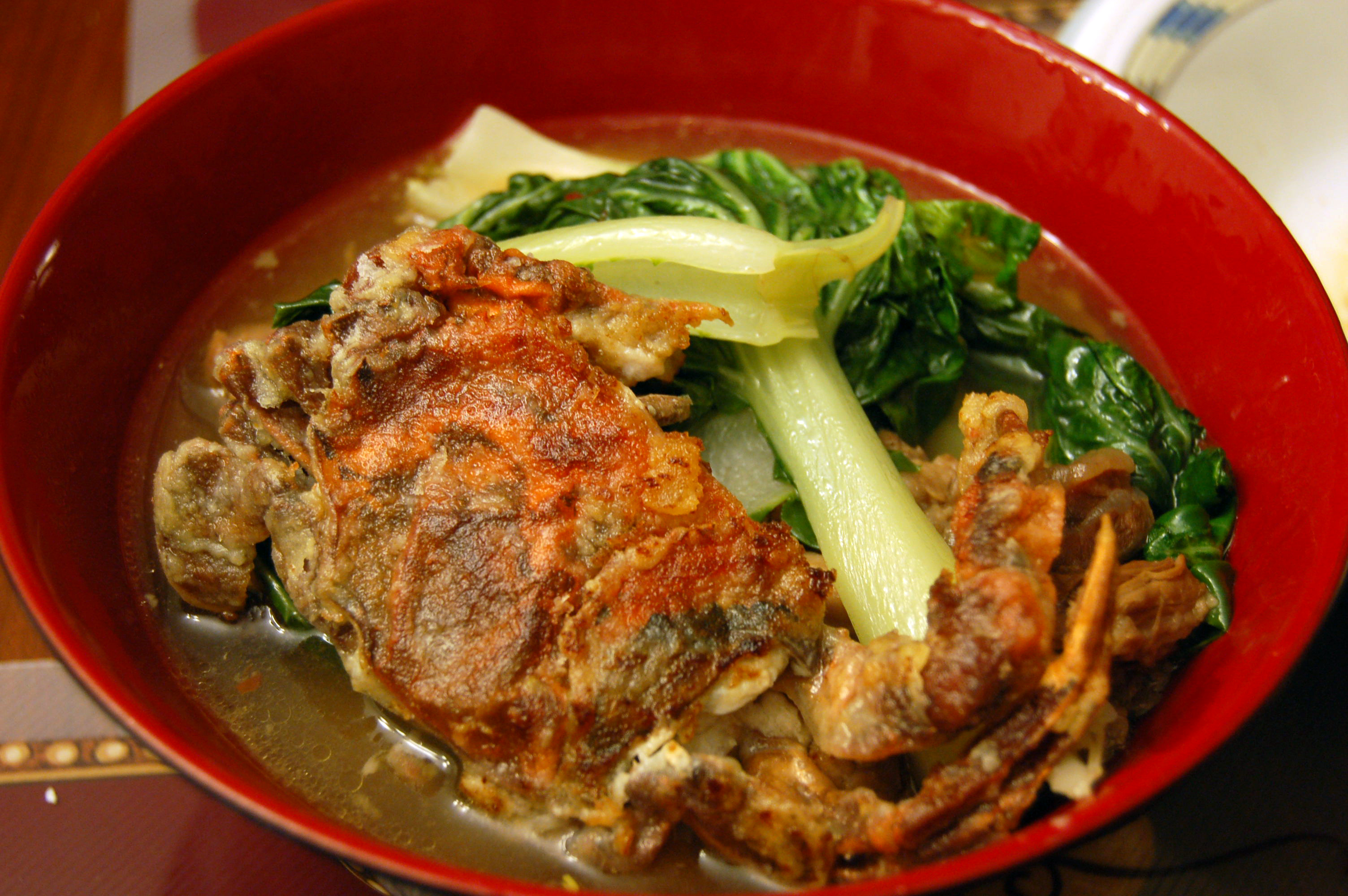

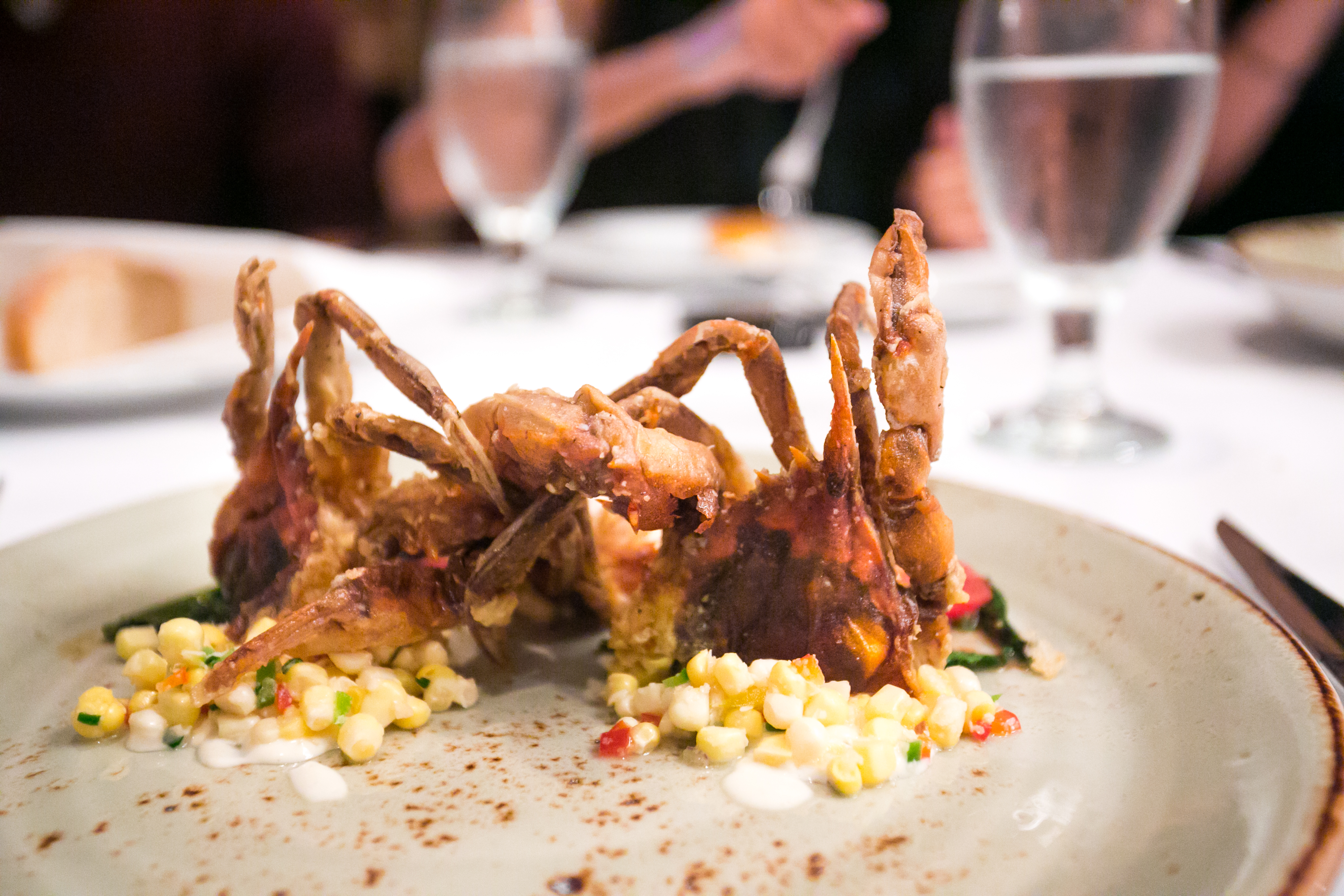

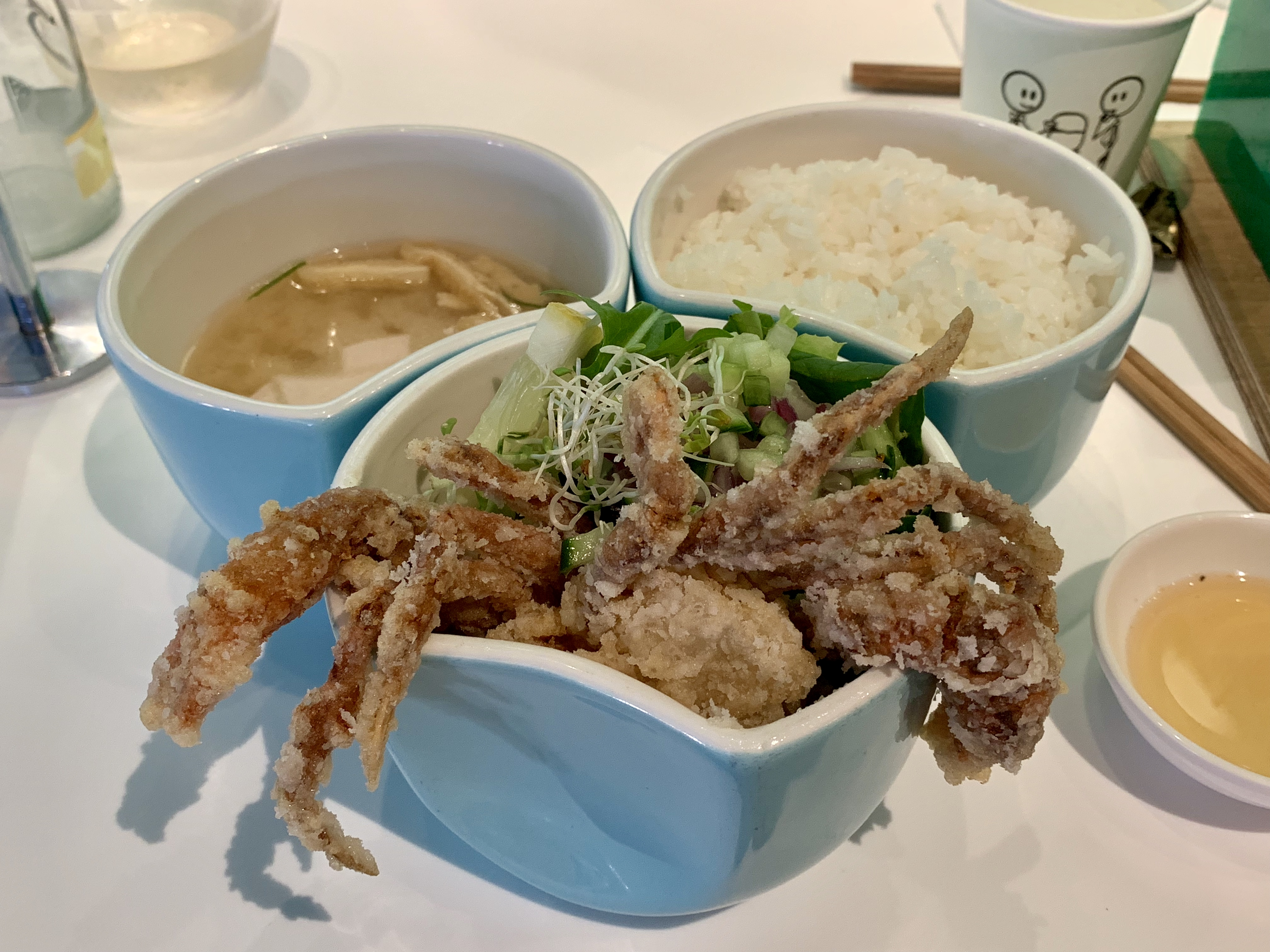

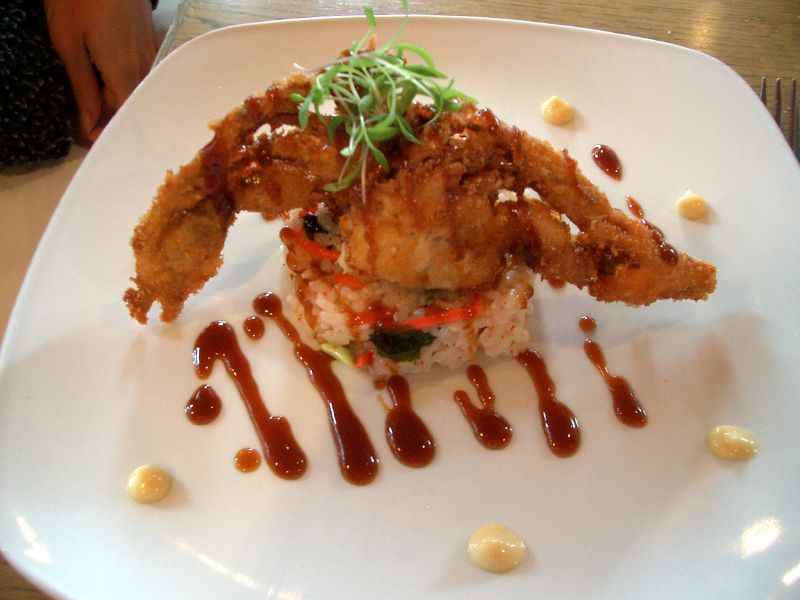

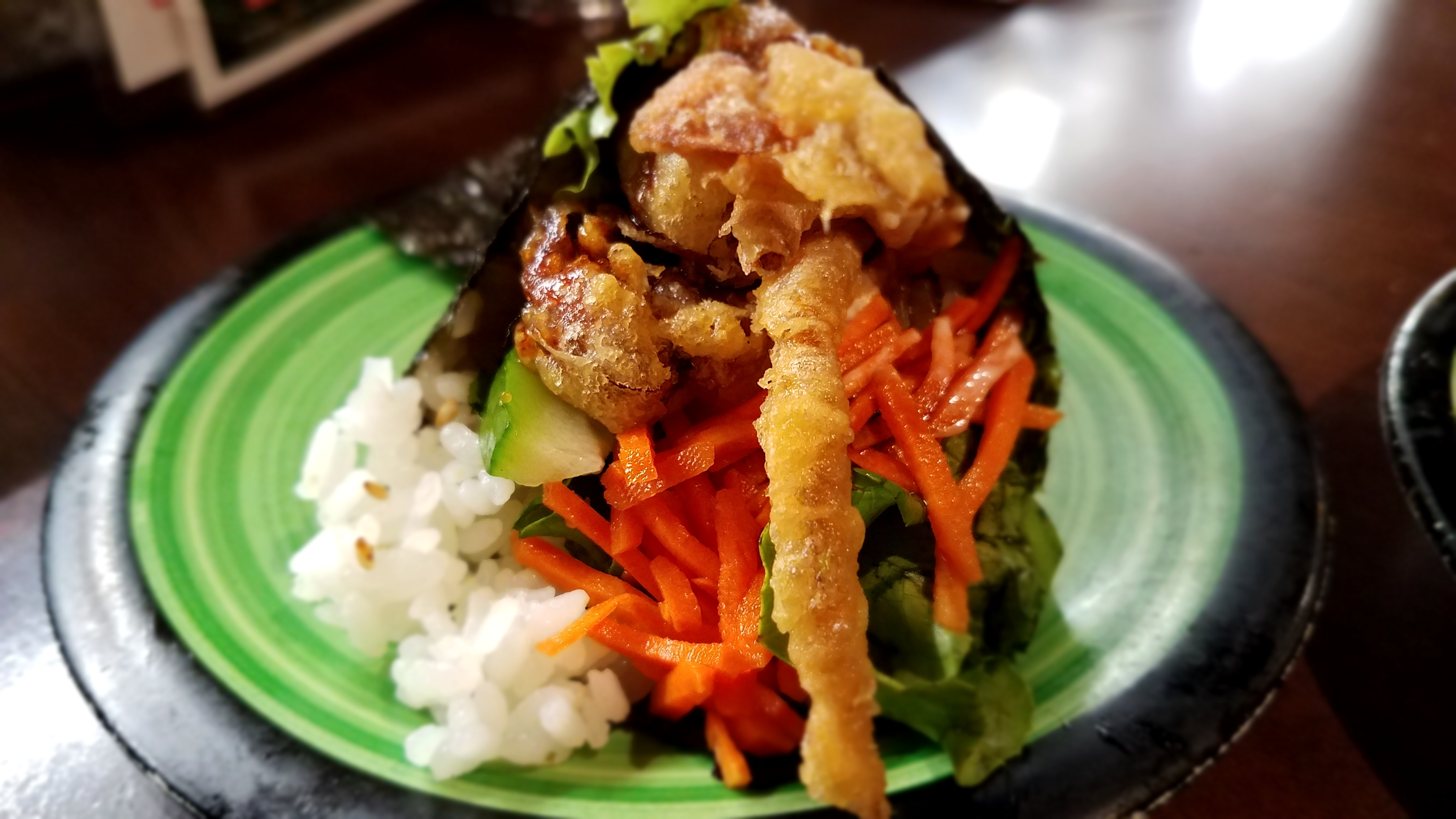
In temaki

== See also ==
- List of crab dishes
- List of seafood dishes
