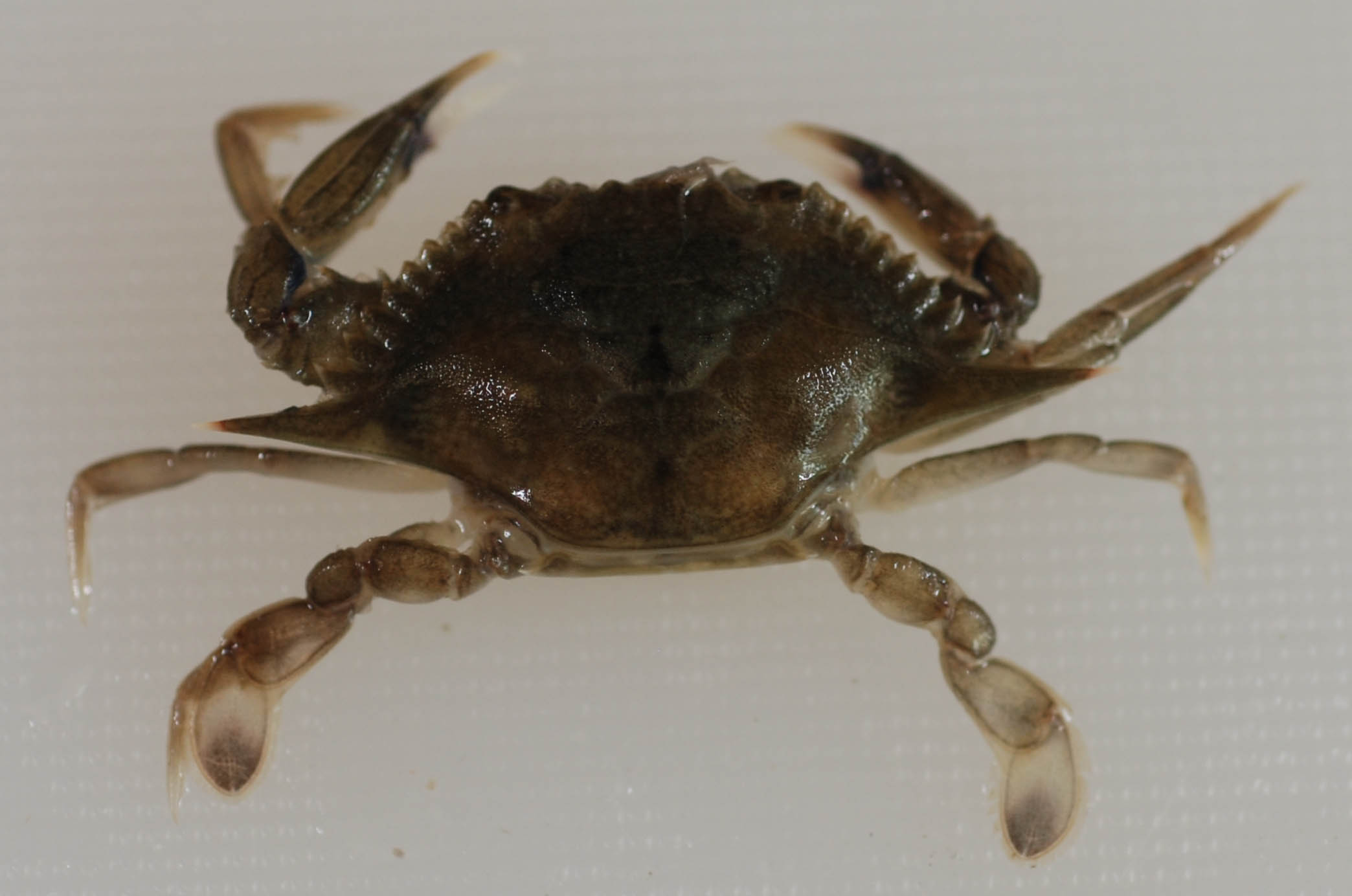

Scientific classification
- Kingdom: Animalia
- Phylum: Arthropoda
- Clade: Pancrustacea
- Class: Malacostraca
- Order: Decapoda
- Suborder: Pleocyemata
- Infraorder: Brachyura
- Family: Portunidae
- Genus: Callinectes
- Species: C. similis

Binomial name
- Callinectes similis Williams, 1966

= Callinectes similis =

Species of crab

Callinectes similis, sometimes called the lesser blue crab or dwarf crab, is a West Atlantic species of blue crab. It was described by Austin B. Williams in 1966.

== Description ==
Callinectes similis is a good swimmer, and its last pereiopods are expanded to paddles with which it swims. Adult males may grow up to a width of 122 millimetres (4.8 in), while females may reach 95 mm (3.7 in).

Callinectes similis is most closely related to Callinectes danae, a species also found in the Gulf of Mexico, but whose range extends as far south as Rio Grande do Sul, and C. ornatus, a species found from North Carolina to Rio Grande do Sul. C. similis is most easily separated from C. danae and C. ornatus by the form of the first and second pleopods in males. It can be told apart from the more distantly related C. sapidus by the number of teeth on the front edge of the carapace, there being six in C. similis and only four in C. sapidus.

== Distribution ==
Callinectes similis is found in the Western Atlantic Ocean, Caribbean Sea and Gulf of Mexico from the United States to Colombia. It reaches its northern limit near Delaware Bay. There has been considerable confusion between the various species of Callinectes, and it now appears that all individuals reported as C. danae and C. ornatus from the Gulf of Mexico (with the exception of parts of Florida) are actually C. similis.

== Ecology ==
Callinectes similis lives in marshes and estuaries, being the dominant crab in open bays. The species is limited to salinities of at least 15‰, and temperature may also affect reproduction.

The diet of C. similis consists of a variety of foodstuffs, including plants, fish, polychaetes, other crustaceans including Farfantepenaeus aztecus and Portunus gibbesii, molluscs such as Mulinia lateralis, and detritus.

Spawning takes place in the spring and fall, with females returning to estuaries to release their eggs. Ovigerous (egg-carrying) females carry an average of more than 250,000 eggs.

== Fishery ==
Although it is not usually targeted because of its relatively small size, C. similis is sometimes caught alongside C. sapidus.
