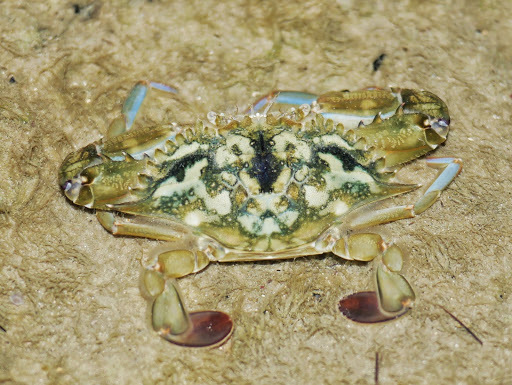

Scientific classification
- Domain: Eukaryota
- Kingdom: Animalia
- Phylum: Arthropoda
- Class: Malacostraca
- Order: Decapoda
- Suborder: Pleocyemata
- Infraorder: Brachyura
- Family: Portunidae
- Genus: Callinectes
- Species: C. marginatus

Binomial name
- Callinectes marginatus (A. Milne-Edwards, 1861)

Synonyms
- Callinectes diacanthus var. africanus A. Milne-Edwards, 1879; Callinectes larvatus Ordway, 1863; Neptunus marginatus A. Milne-Edwards, 1861

= Callinectes marginatus =

Species of crab

Callinectes marginatus, commonly known as the sharptooth swimcrab or marbled swimcrab, is a species of swimming crab in the family Portunidae.

== Description ==
Its carapace bears nine spines behind each eye, the last of which is around twice the length of the previous one, making the whole carapace around 10 centimetres (3.9 in) wide.

== Distribution and ecology ==
Although the name Callinectes marginatus was used by Mary J. Rathbun and others to also cover animals now referred to the species C. larvatus and C. diacanthus, C. marginatus is now used only for a species found from the Cape Verde Islands and Nouadhibou, Mauritania to Angola.

C. marginatus appears to be entirely marine, unlike some of its congeners, although there are records from the estuaries of the Congo River and the Hwini River. The crabs dig holes around 30 cm (12 in) wide in mudflats.
