= Neoepilobocera =

Scientific classification
- Kingdom: Animalia
- Phylum: Arthropoda
- Class: Malacostraca
- Order: Decapoda
- Suborder: Pleocyemata
- Infraorder: Brachyura
- Family: Pseudothelphusidae
- Genus: Neoepilobocera; Capolongo & Pretzmann, 2002
- Species: N. gertraudae

Binomial name
- Neoepilobocera gertraudae (Pretzmann, 1965)

Genus of crabs

Neoepilobocera gertraudae is a species of cave-dwelling crab from Cuba.

== Classification ==
The species was first described by Gerhard Pretzmann as Epilobocera gertraudae in 1965. N. gertraudae is classified in the family Pseudothelphusidae, and is the only species in the genus Neoepilobocera. It is considered by some authorities to be synonymous with the widespread Epilobocera cubensis.

== Distribution ==
It is only found in karstic caves in Viñales and nearby parts of Pinar del Río Province, Cuba.

== Description ==
Neoepilobocera gertraudae differs from the other freshwater crabs of Cuba, all in the genus Epilobocera, by its longer legs and paler coloration, both of which are adaptations to living in caves. It is smaller than Epilobocera, reaching a carapace length of only 31 millimetres (1.2 in), and with a flattened body.
