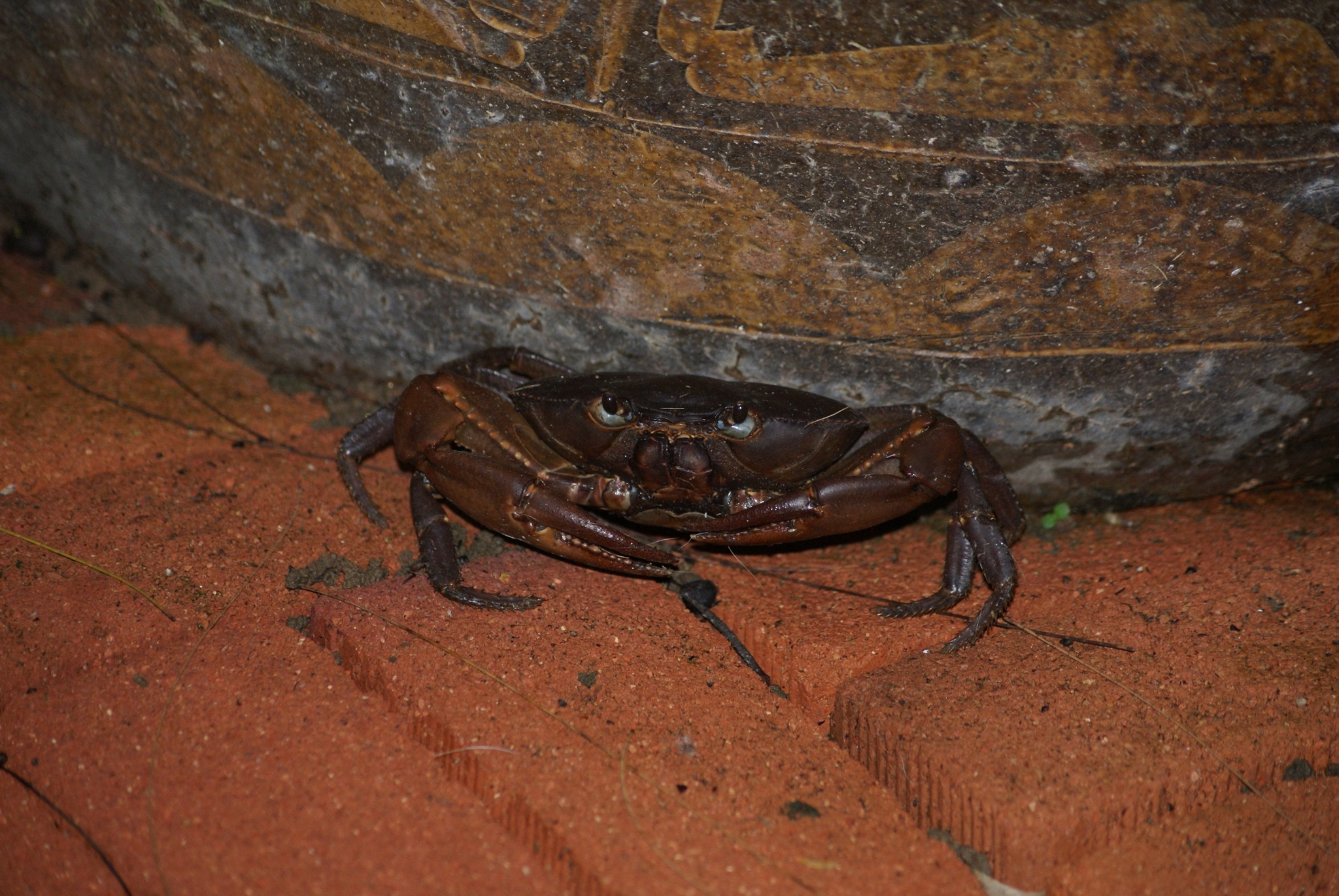

Conservation status
- Least Concern (IUCN 3.1)

Scientific classification
- Kingdom: Animalia
- Phylum: Arthropoda
- Clade: Pancrustacea
- Class: Malacostraca
- Order: Decapoda
- Suborder: Pleocyemata
- Infraorder: Brachyura
- Family: Epiloboceridae
- Genus: Epilobocera
- Species: E. sinuatifrons

Binomial name
- Epilobocera sinuatifrons (A. Milne-Edwards, 1866)

Synonyms
- Boscia sinuatifrons A. Milne-Edwards, 1866

= Epilobocera sinuatifrons =

Species of crustacean

Epilobocera sinuatifrons is a freshwater crab of the family Epiloboceridae. The species is an endemic species and widely distributed in streams of Puerto Rico and occurs also on Saint Croix (the U.S. Virgin Islands). The common name of this freshwater crab is "buruquena." An important aspect of this crab is its type of development; the buruquena undergoes direct development. This means that the crab does not produce larvae. Instead, it breeds in freshwater streams and releases small crabs, not larvae like freshwater shrimp.

Epilobocera sinuatifrons is one of the most abundant predatory freshwater decapods in the freshwater streams of Puerto Rico. The juveniles are aquatic, while the adults also feed on terrestrial resources on the forest floor adjacent to streams.

== See also ==
- List of crustaceans of Puerto Rico
