= Epilobocera haytensis =

Conservation status
- Vulnerable (IUCN 3.1)

Scientific classification
- Kingdom: Animalia
- Phylum: Arthropoda
- Class: Malacostraca
- Order: Decapoda
- Suborder: Pleocyemata
- Infraorder: Brachyura
- Family: Epiloboceridae
- Genus: Epilobocera
- Species: E. haytensis

Binomial name
- Epilobocera haytensis M.J. Rathbun,1893

Species of crab

Epilobocera haytensis, also known in Dominican Spanish as jaiba de río (borrowed from Taíno), is a freshwater crab endemic to the Caribbean island of Hispaniola (split between the Dominican Republic and Haiti). It is found in nearly all of Hispaniola's lowland rivers, and is often harvested for food in both countries of the island.
