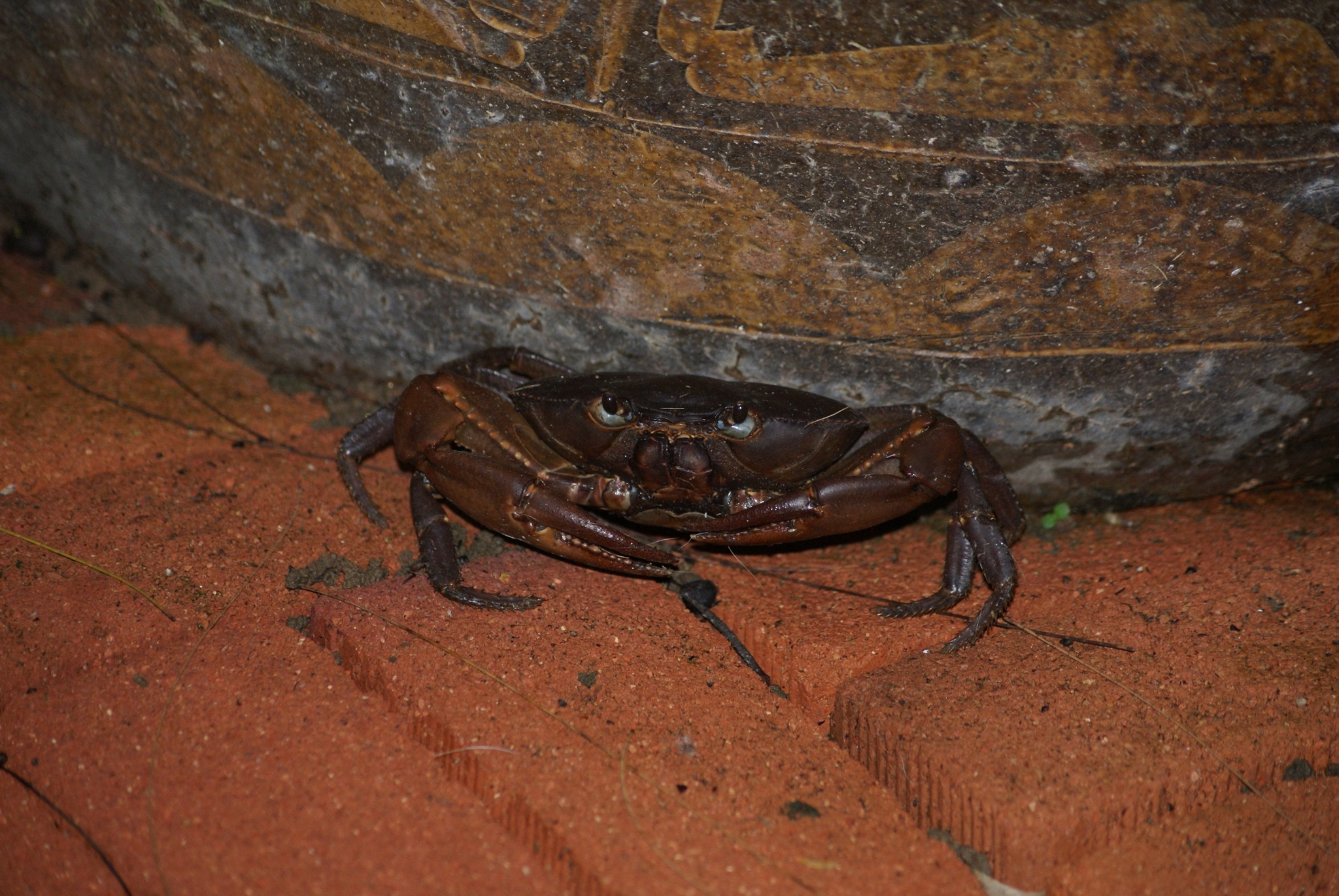
- Epilobocera sinuatifrons

Scientific classification
- Domain: Eukaryota
- Kingdom: Animalia
- Phylum: Arthropoda
- Class: Malacostraca
- Order: Decapoda
- Suborder: Pleocyemata
- Infraorder: Brachyura
- Family: Epiloboceridae; Smalley, 1964
- Genus: Epilobocera; Stimpson, 1860

Synonyms
- Opisthocera Smith, 1870

= Epilobocera =

Genus of crabs

Epilobocera is a genus of crabs in the family Epiloboceridae (formerly Pseudothelphusidae). It is the only genus in its family; this taxonomic arrangement follows the revision of the family Pseudothelphusidae by Álvarez and colleagues.

== Species ==
Epilobocera contains the following species:

- Epilobocera armata Smith, 1870
- Epilobocera capolongoi Pretzmann, 2000
- Epilobocera cubensis Stimpson, 1860
- Epilobocera gertraudae Pretzmann, 1965
- Epilobocera gilmanii (Smith, 1870)
- Epilobocera haytensis Rathbun, 1893
- Epilobocera sinuatifrons (A. Milne-Edwards, 1866)
- Epilobocera wetherbeei Rodriguez & Williams, 1995
