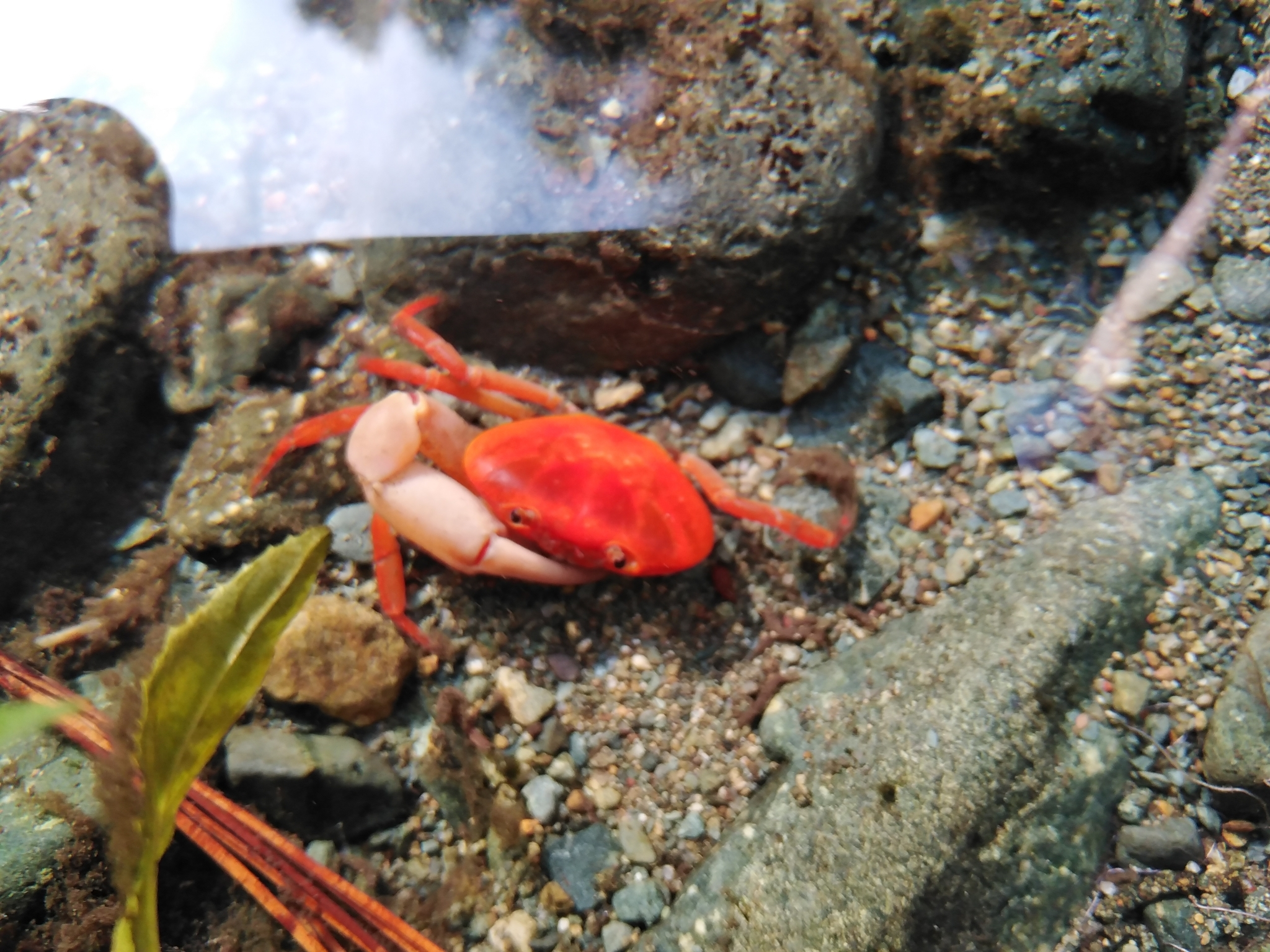

Scientific classification
- Domain: Eukaryota
- Kingdom: Animalia
- Phylum: Arthropoda
- Class: Malacostraca
- Order: Decapoda
- Suborder: Pleocyemata
- Infraorder: Brachyura
- Family: Epiloboceridae
- Genus: Epilobocera
- Species: E. wetherbeei

Binomial name
- Epilobocera wetherbeei Rodríguez & Williams, 1995

= Epilobocera wetherbeei =

Species of crab

Epilobocera wetherbeei is a species of crab from the genus Epilobocera. The species was originally described in 1995.
