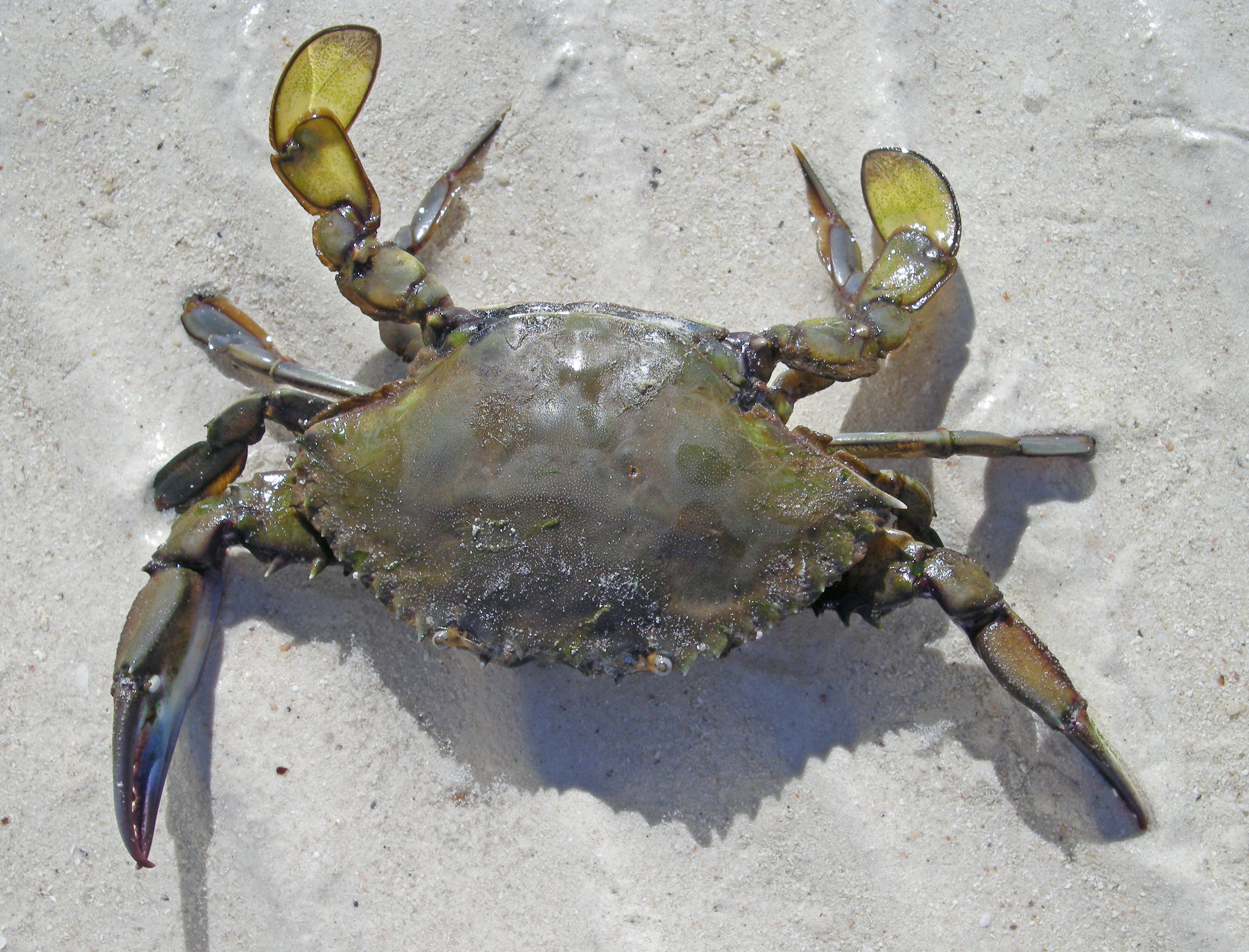
- Callinectes arcuatus in the Gulf of California

Scientific classification
- Kingdom: Animalia
- Phylum: Arthropoda
- Clade: Pancrustacea
- Class: Malacostraca
- Order: Decapoda
- Suborder: Pleocyemata
- Infraorder: Brachyura
- Family: Portunidae
- Genus: Callinectes
- Species: C. arcuatus

Binomial name
- Callinectes arcuatus Ordway, 1863

Synonyms
- Callinectes dubia Kingsley, 1879; Callinectes nitidus Milne-Edwards, 1879; Callinectes pleuriticus Ordway, 1863

= Callinectes arcuatus =

Species of crab

Callinectes arcuatus is a species of swimming crab in the genus Callinectes that lives along the Pacific coast of Central America.

== Distribution and ecology ==
C. arcuatus is found along the Pacific coast of North and Central America from Mexico southwards. Its diet comprises fish, molluscs, shrimp and plant matter. Occasionally, populations become established in bays in southern California, which are thought to represent single cohorts transported as larvae; these populations typically die out within a few years.

== Fishery ==
A small fishery for this species is carried out in Costa Rica, run by 10–15 fishermen in the Golfo de Nicoya. The fishery is subject to a maximum of 1600 traps, but the size of caught males was already decreasing in 2009, and the market appeared to be saturated.

== Taxonomy ==
Callinectes arcuatus was described in 1863 by Albert Ordway in his monograph of the genus Callinectes, using material collected at Cape St. Lucas.
