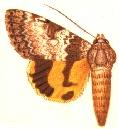

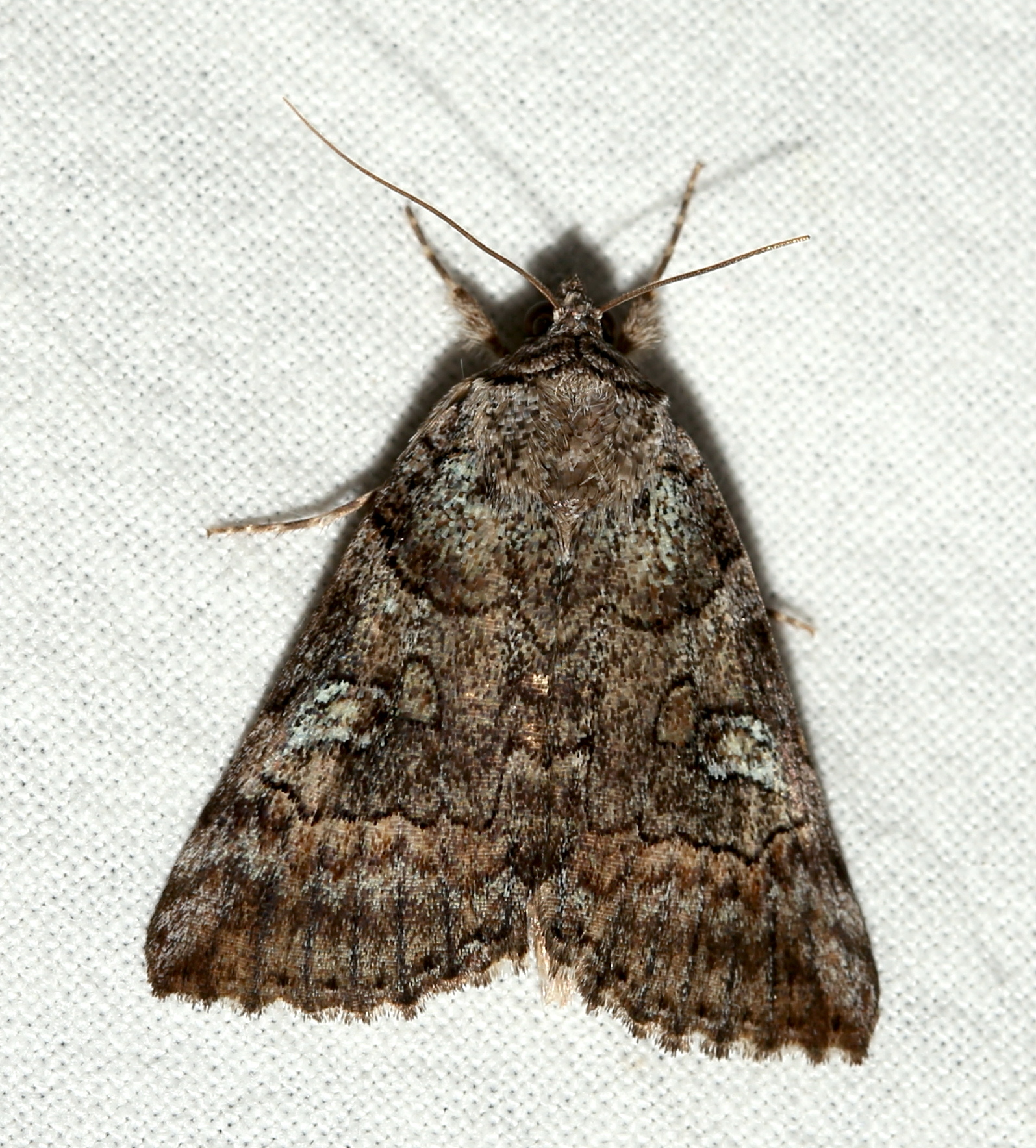

Scientific classification
- Kingdom: Animalia
- Phylum: Arthropoda
- Class: Insecta
- Order: Lepidoptera
- Superfamily: Noctuoidea
- Family: Erebidae
- Genus: Catocala
- Species: C. similis

Binomial name
- Catocala similis W. H. Edwards, 1864

Synonyms
- Ephesia similis; Phalaena amasia Smith, 1797; Catocala formula Grote & Robinson, 1866; Catocala aholah Strecker, 1874; Catocala formula var. isabella H. Edwards, 1880; Catocala similis aholah; Catocala similis isabella

= Catocala similis =

Similar underwing

Species of moth

Catocala similis, the similar underwing, is a moth of the family Erebidae. The species was first described by William Henry Edwards in 1864. It is found in North America from Ontario and Quebec south through Maine and Connecticut to Florida, west to Texas and Oklahoma, and north to Minnesota.

The wingspan is 35–45 mm. Adults are on wing from May to July depending on the location. There is probably one generation per year.

The larvae feed on Carya illinoinensis and Quercus stellata.
