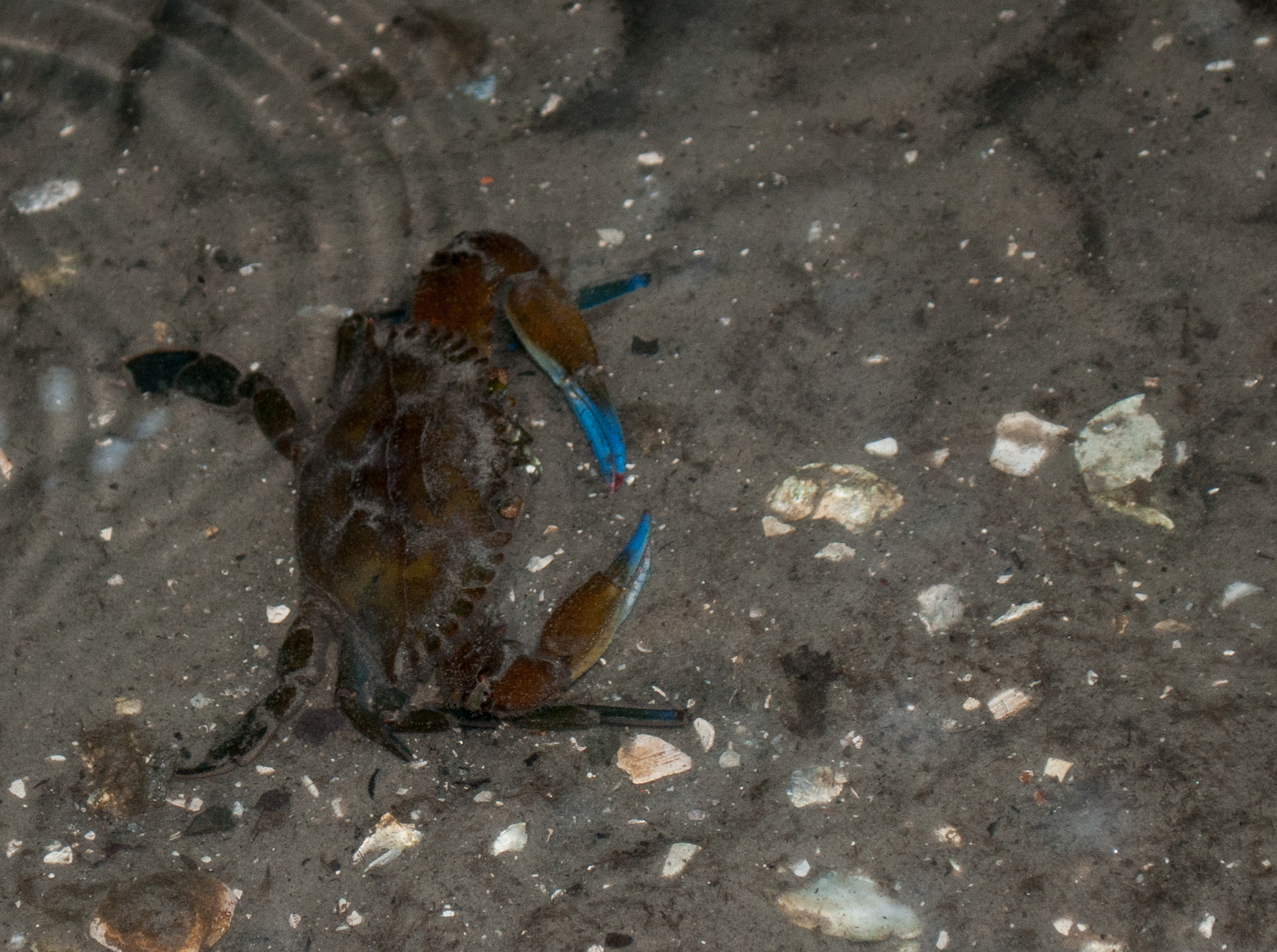

Scientific classification
- Kingdom: Animalia
- Phylum: Arthropoda
- Clade: Pancrustacea
- Class: Malacostraca
- Order: Decapoda
- Suborder: Pleocyemata
- Infraorder: Brachyura
- Family: Portunidae
- Genus: Callinectes
- Species: C. exasperatus

Binomial name
- Callinectes exasperatus (Gerstaecker, 1856)

= Callinectes exasperatus =

Species of crustacean

Callinectes exasperatus (common name: rugose swimming crab) is a species of swimming crab native to the western Atlantic Ocean. The diet of this species is carrion. They are not commercially fished.
