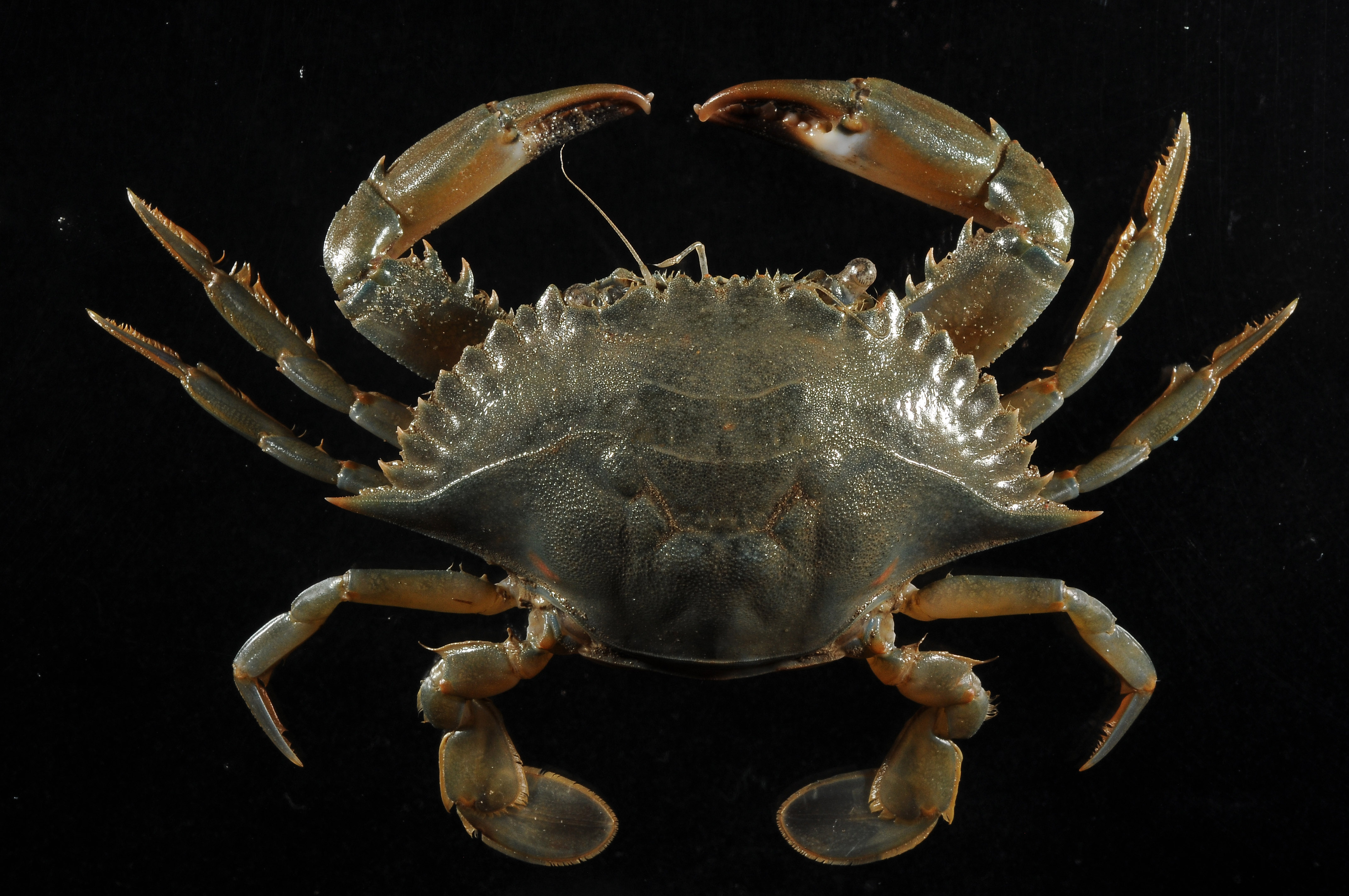

Scientific classification
- Domain: Eukaryota
- Kingdom: Animalia
- Phylum: Arthropoda
- Class: Malacostraca
- Order: Decapoda
- Suborder: Pleocyemata
- Infraorder: Brachyura
- Family: Portunidae
- Genus: Callinectes
- Species: C. bocourti

Binomial name
- Callinectes bocourti A. Milne-Edwards, 1879

= Callinectes bocourti =

Species of crustacean

Callinectes bocourti is a species of swimming crab. Its native range extends from Jamaica and Belize south to Brazil, but it has been found as a nonindigenous species as far north as North Carolina. This crab has a light brown shell with red spots and markings on it, and red claws and legs. C. bocourti is edible and has been the subject of small-scale fishery.
