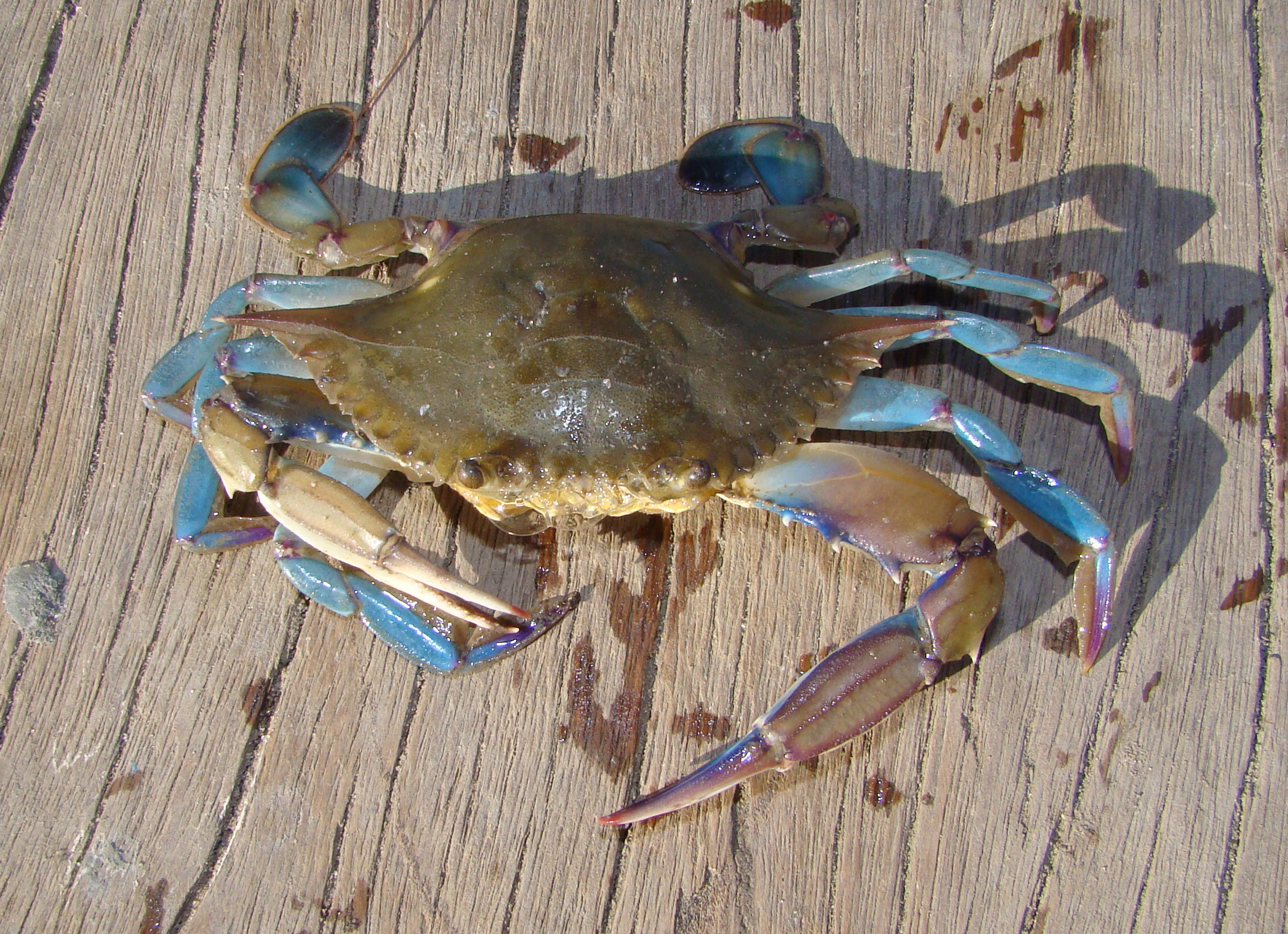

Scientific classification
- Domain: Eukaryota
- Kingdom: Animalia
- Phylum: Arthropoda
- Class: Malacostraca
- Order: Decapoda
- Suborder: Pleocyemata
- Infraorder: Brachyura
- Family: Portunidae
- Genus: Callinectes
- Species: C. danae

Binomial name
- Callinectes danae S. I. Smith, 1869

= Callinectes danae =

Species of crab

Callinectes danae is a species of swimming crab. The carapace is olive-brown and up to 5.8 cm (2.3 in) long; the walking legs are blue. The species is common in Brazil and the West Indies.
