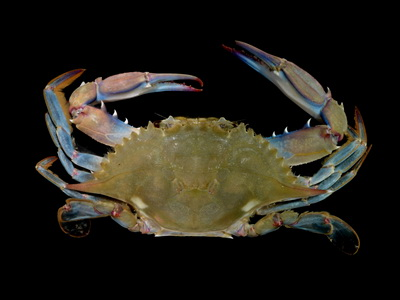

Scientific classification
- Domain: Eukaryota
- Kingdom: Animalia
- Phylum: Arthropoda
- Class: Malacostraca
- Order: Decapoda
- Suborder: Pleocyemata
- Infraorder: Brachyura
- Family: Portunidae
- Genus: Callinectes
- Species: C. ornatus

Binomial name
- Callinectes ornatus Ordway, 1863

= Callinectes ornatus =

Species of crab

Callinectes ornatus is a species of swimming crab in the genus Callinectes. It can be distinguished from the closely related Atlantic blue crab (Callinectes sapidus) by the presence of six frontal teeth on the carapace, compared with only four for C. sapidus. C. ornatus is also smaller, at a maximum carapace width of only 93 millimetres (3.7 in), compared to 230 mm (9.1 in) in C. sapidus, and is therefore not commercially exploited.

Their shells are light yellow-brown to red-brown in color. The lower tips of the claws are blue. The two spikes on each side of their shells are not as long as in blue crabs. They can be found in the western Atlantic Ocean, as well the Caribbean coastlines. Their diet consists of small crustaceans and small fish. They are also scavengers.
