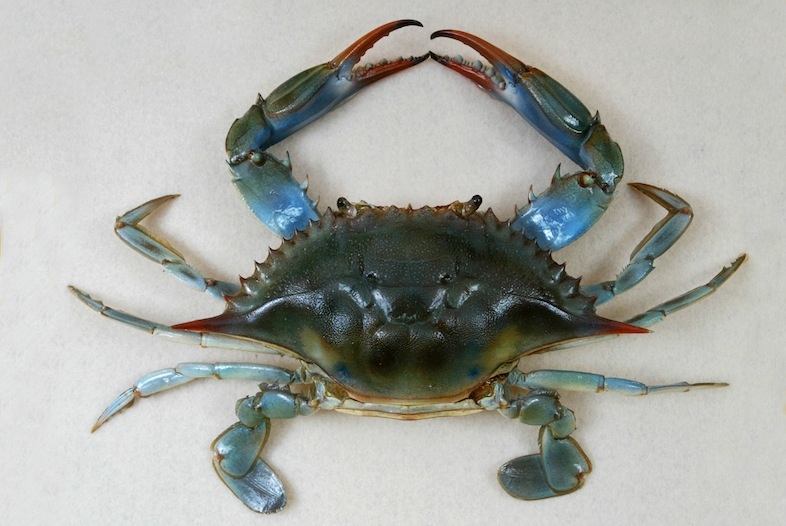
- Female from the collection of The Children's Museum of Indianapolis

Scientific classification
- Kingdom: Animalia
- Phylum: Arthropoda
- Clade: Pancrustacea
- Class: Malacostraca
- Order: Decapoda
- Suborder: Pleocyemata
- Infraorder: Brachyura
- Family: Portunidae
- Genus: Callinectes
- Species: C. sapidus

Binomial name
- Callinectes sapidus Rathbun, 1896

Synonyms
- Lupa hastata Say, 1817; Portunus diacantha Latreille, 1825; Lupa diacantha Milne-Edwards, 1834; Callinectes hastatus Ordway, 1883; Callinectes diacanthus (Latreille, 1825); Callinectes sapidus acutidens Rathbun, 1896

= Callinectes sapidus =

Species of crustacean

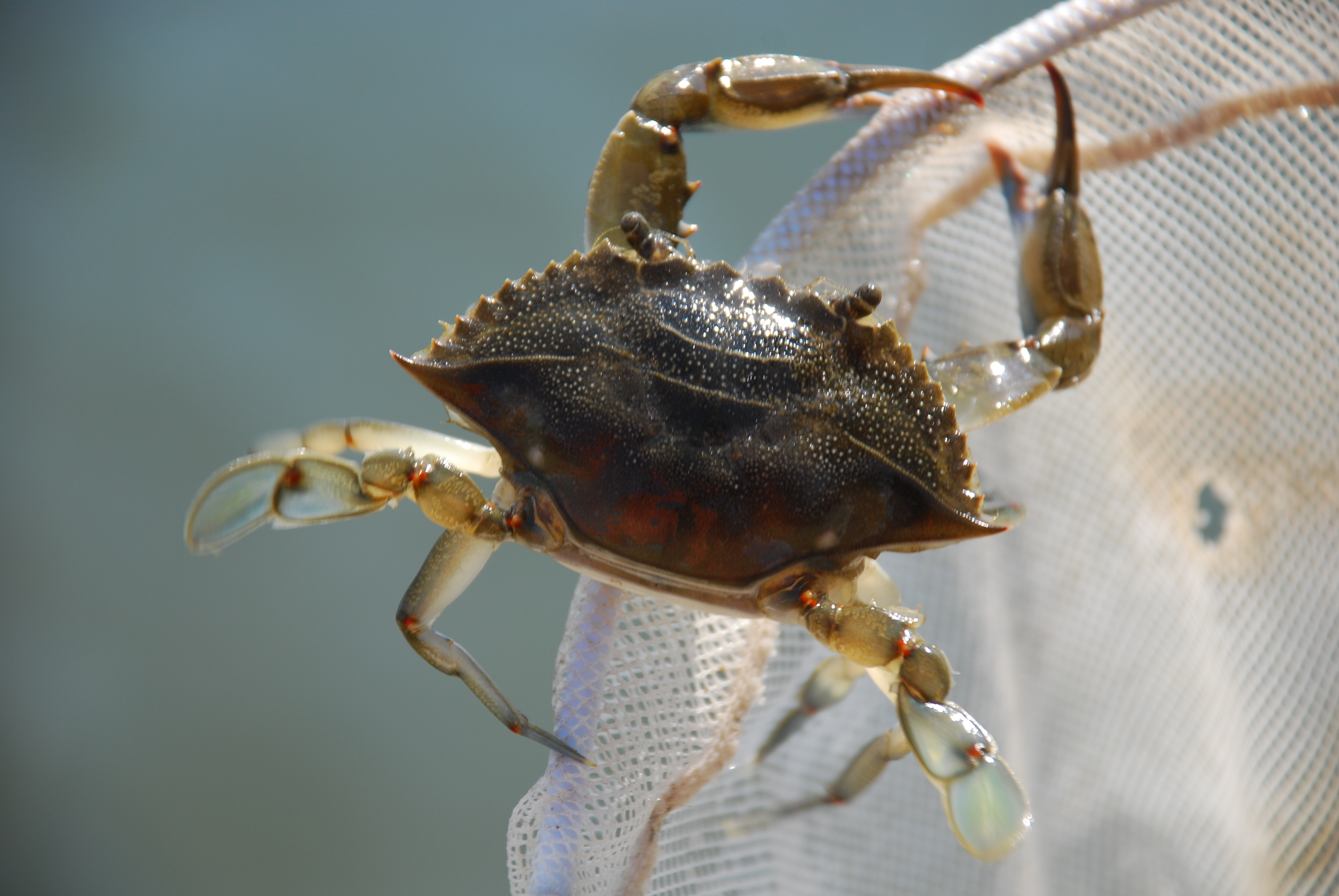
Blue crab escaping from a net (Core Banks, North Carolina)

Callinectes sapidus, commonly known as the blue crab, Atlantic blue crab, or, regionally, the Maryland blue crab, is a species of crab native to the waters of the western Atlantic Ocean and the Gulf of Mexico, and introduced internationally.

C. sapidus is of considerable culinary and economic importance in the United States, particularly in Louisiana, the Carolinas, the Chesapeake Bay, Delaware, and New Jersey. It is Maryland's largest commercial fishery and has been designated its state crustacean. Due to overfishing and environmental pressures, some of the fisheries have seen declining yields, especially in the Chesapeake Bay fishery.

Unlike the other fisheries affected by climate change, blue crab is expected to do well; warming causes better breeding conditions, more survivable winters, and a greater range of habitable areas on the Atlantic coast. Whether this will have negative effects on the surrounding ecosystems from an increased crab population is still unclear. However, rising sea levels as a result of climate change will likely hinder blue crab reproduction as they will decrease the amount of eelgrass necessary for female crabs to complete their final shedding stage.

== Etymology ==
The genus name Callinectes comes from Ancient Greek κάλλος (kállos), meaning 'beautiful', and νήκτης (nḗktēs), meaning 'swimmer'. The specific epithet sapidus is Latin for 'savory'. A common name for crabs in Kikitowämank is tuttascuc, used by the Powhatan people, and in Nanticoke, tah'quah.

== Description ==
Sexual dimorphism

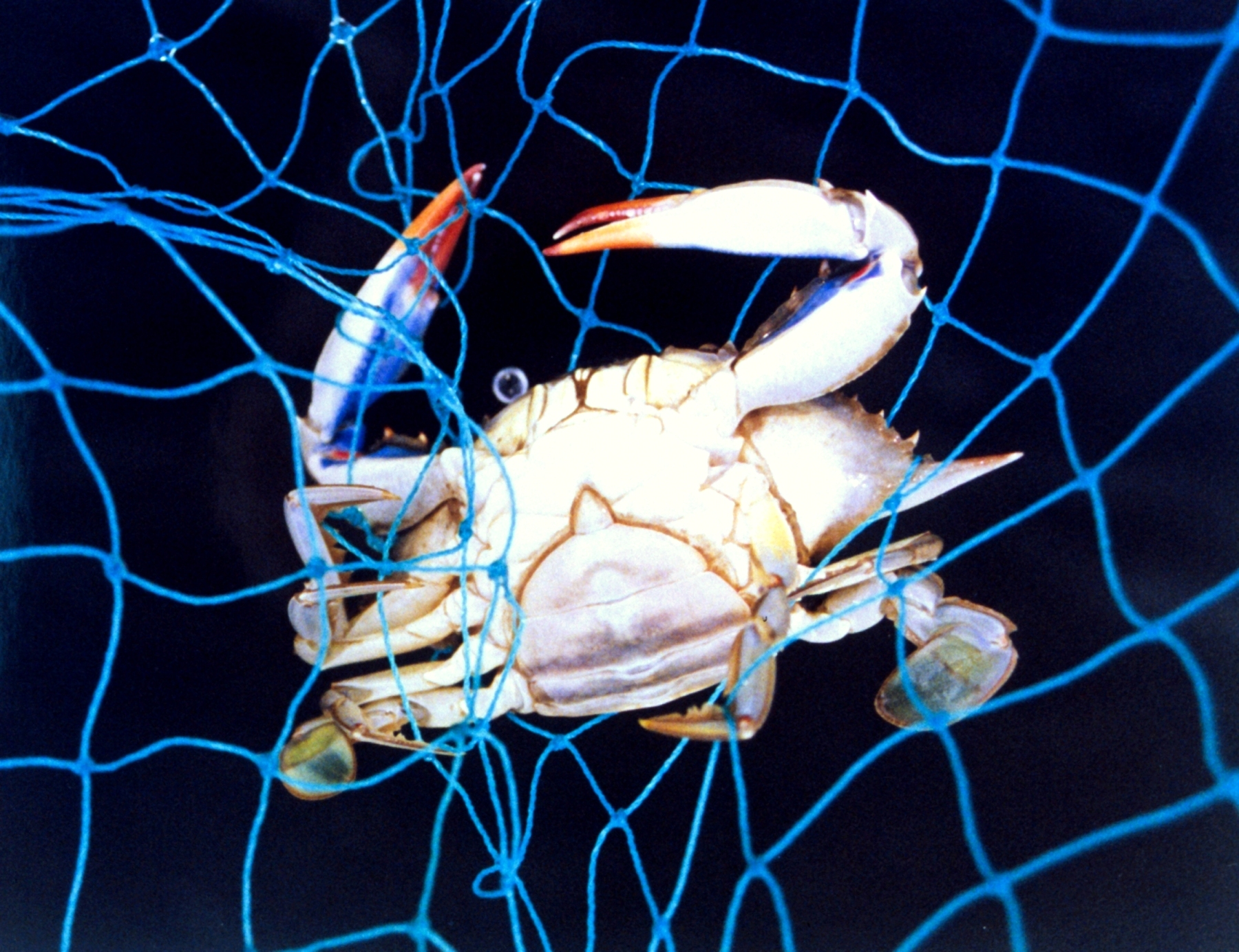
Females (or "sooks") have a broad abdomen, similar to the shape of the dome of the United States Capitol.

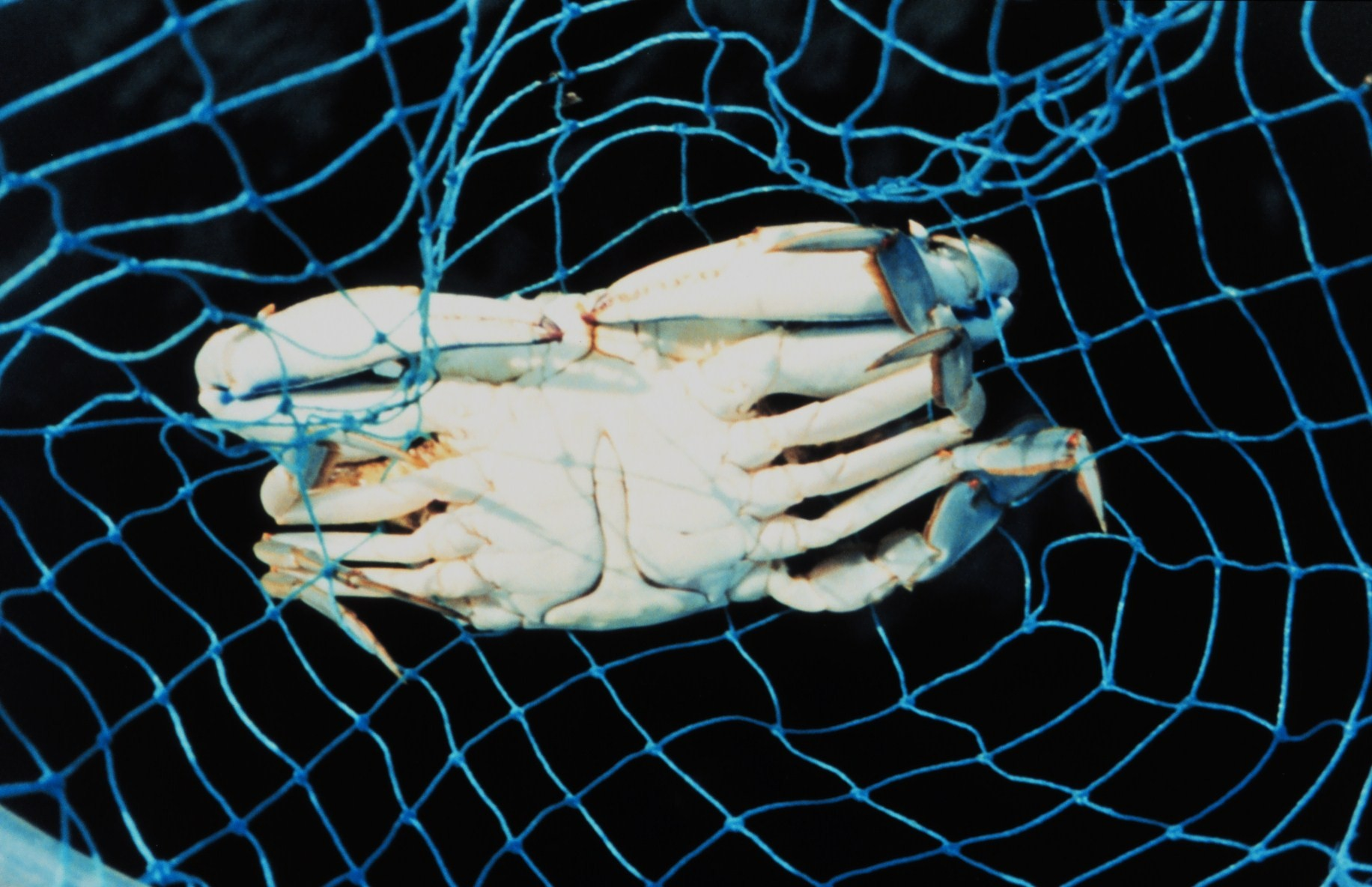
Males (or "jimmies") have a narrow abdomen, resembling the Washington Monument.

C. sapidus is a decapod crab of the swimming crab family Portunidae. The genus Callinectes is distinguished from other portunid crabs by the lack of an internal cartilaginous spine on the carpus (the middle segment of the claw), as well as by the T-shape of the male abdomen. Blue crabs may grow to a carapace width of 23 cm (9 in). C. sapidus individuals exhibit sexual dimorphism. Males and females are easily distinguished by the shape of the abdomen (known as the "apron") and by color differences in the chelipeds, or claws. The abdomen is long and slender in males, but wide and rounded in mature females. A popular mnemonic is that the male's apron is shaped like the Washington Monument, while the mature female's resembles the dome of the United States Capitol. Claw color differences are more subtle than apron shape. The immovable, fixed finger of the claws in males is blue with red tips, while females have orange coloration with purple tips. A female's abdomen changes as it matures: an immature female has a triangular-shaped abdomen, whereas a mature female's is rounded.

Other species of Callinectes may be easily confused with C. sapidus because of overlapping ranges and similar morphology. One species is the lesser blue crab (C. similis). It is found further offshore than the common blue crab, and has a smoother granulated carapace. Males of the lesser blue crab also have mottled white coloration on the swimming legs, and females have areas of violet coloration on the internal surfaces of the claws. C. sapidus can be distinguished from another related species found within its range, C. ornatus, by number of frontal teeth on the carapace. C. sapidus has four, while C. ornatus has six.

The crab's blue hue stems from a number of pigments in the shell, including alpha-crustacyanin, which interacts with a red pigment, astaxanthin, to form a greenish-blue coloration. When the crab is cooked, the alpha-crustacyanin breaks down, leaving only the astaxanthin, which turns the crab to a bright orange-red color.

Organochlorides are found by Sheridan et al 1975 to be transferred to the C. sapidus hepatopancreas. They find that among organochlorides, DDT specifically is converted both to DDE and DDD in this crab.

== Distribution ==
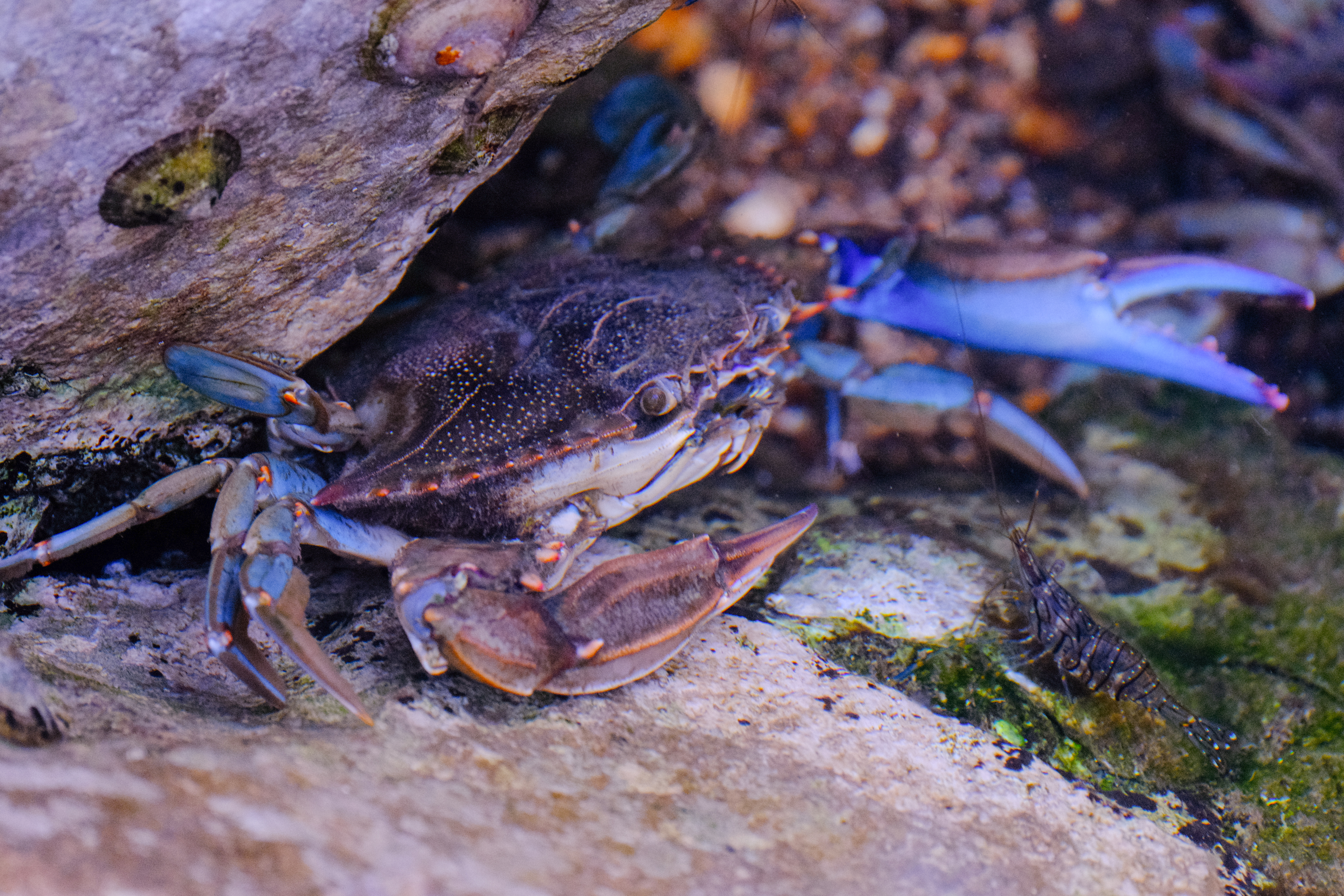
Blue Crab as invasive species in the Adriatic Sea

C. sapidus is native to the western edge of the Atlantic Ocean from Cape Cod to Argentina and around the entire coast of the Gulf of Mexico. It has recently been reported north of Cape Cod in the Gulf of Maine, potentially representing a range expansion due to climate change. It has been introduced (via ballast water) to Japanese and European waters, and has been observed in the Baltic, North, Mediterranean, and Black Seas. The first record from European waters was made in 1901 at Rochefort, France. In some parts of its introduced range, C. sapidus has become the subject of crab fishery, including in Greece, where the local population may be decreasing as a result of overfishing. In Italy, public awareness of the detrimental impact of this species on local mollusks is rapidly growing and, especially in the Po delta area and on the Adriatic Sea coast, eradication efforts are undergoing, both by local authorities and by local fishermen. In 2023, Italy's Ministry of Agriculture appointed a "commissioner for the blue crab" to coordinate efforts to address the species' spread in Italian waters. Representatives of the agricultural and fishing industries have attributed significant losses in clam fisheries to blue crab predation, with some industry estimates putting the economic damage at up to €100 million since the infestation began.

== Ecology ==
Some of the natural predators of C. sapidus include eels, drum, striped bass, spot, trout, some sharks, humans, cownose rays, and whiptail stingrays. C. sapidus is an omnivore, eating both plants and animals. It typically consumes thin-shelled bivalves (such as clams, mussels, and oysters), crustaceans, annelids, small fish, plants (such as eelgrass), and nearly any other item it can find, including carrion, other C. sapidus individuals, and animal waste. In salt marshes, C. sapidus will eat marsh periwinkles, Littoraria irrorata during high tides. Although an aquatic predator, C. sapidus will remain in shallow pits in salt marshes at low tide and ambush intertidal prey such as fiddler crabs (e.g., Minuca pugnax) and purple marsh crabs (Sesarma reticulatum) C. sapidus may be able to control populations of the invasive green crab, Carcinus maenas; numbers of the two species are negatively correlated, and C. maenas is not found in the Chesapeake Bay, where C. sapidus is most abundant.

C. sapidus is subject to a number of diseases and parasites. These include a number of viruses, bacteria, microsporidians, ciliates, and others. The nemertean worm Carcinonemertes carcinophila commonly parasitizes C. sapidus, especially females and older crabs, although it has little adverse effect on the crab. A trematode that parasitizes C. sapidus is itself targeted by the hyperparasite Urosporidium crescens. The most harmful parasites may be the microsporidian Ameson michaelis, the amoeba Paramoeba perniciosa and the dinoflagellate Hematodinium perezi, which causes "bitter crab disease".

In 2021, scientists from the University of Maryland completed DNA sequencing of the genome of C. sapidus in Baltimore after six years of research to help better understand the species. This genetic map is expected to help scientists understand how the blue crabs will be affected by climate change and warmer water temperatures, along with which mutations cause disease, traits that influence meat production, and which females have the best reproductive ability.

== Life cycle ==
=== Growth ===
Eggs of C. sapidus hatch in high-salinity waters of inlets, coastal waters, and mouths of rivers, and are carried to the ocean by ebb tides. During seven planktonic (zoeal) stages, blue crab larvae float near the surface and feed on microorganisms they encounter. After the eighth zoeal stage, larvae molt into megalopae. This larval form has small claws called chelipeds for grasping prey items. Megalopae selectively migrate upward in the water column as tides travel landward toward estuaries. Eventually, blue crabs arrive in brackish water, where they spend the majority of their lives. Chemical cues in estuarine water prompt metamorphosis to the juvenile phase, after which blue crabs appear similar to the adult form.

A blue crab grows by shedding its exoskeleton, or molting, to expose a new, larger exoskeleton. After it hardens, the new shell fills with body tissue. Shell hardening occurs most quickly in low-salinity water where high osmotic pressure allows the shell to become rigid soon after molting. Molting reflects only incremental growth, making age estimation difficult. For blue crabs, the number of molts in a lifetime is about 25. Females typically exhibit 18 molts after the larval stages, while postlarval males molt about 20 times.

Male blue crabs tend to grow broader and have more accentuated lateral spines than females. Growth and molting are profoundly influenced by temperature and food availability. Higher temperatures and greater food resources decrease the period of time between molts, as well as the change in size during molts (molt increment). Salinity and disease also have subtle impacts on molting and growth rate. Molting occurs more rapidly in low-salinity environments. The high osmotic pressure gradient causes water to quickly diffuse into a soft, recently molted blue crab's shell, allowing it to harden more quickly. The effects of diseases and parasites on growth and molting are less well understood, but in many cases have been observed to reduce growth between molts. For example, mature female blue crabs infected with the parasitic rhizocephalan barnacle Loxothylacus texanus appear extremely stunted in growth when compared to uninfected mature females. Blue crabs may reach maturity within one year of hatching in the Gulf of Mexico, while Chesapeake Bay crabs may take up to 18 months to mature. As a result of different growth rates, commercial and recreational crabbing occur year-round in the Gulf of Mexico, while crabbing seasons are closed for colder parts of the year in northern states.

=== Reproduction ===
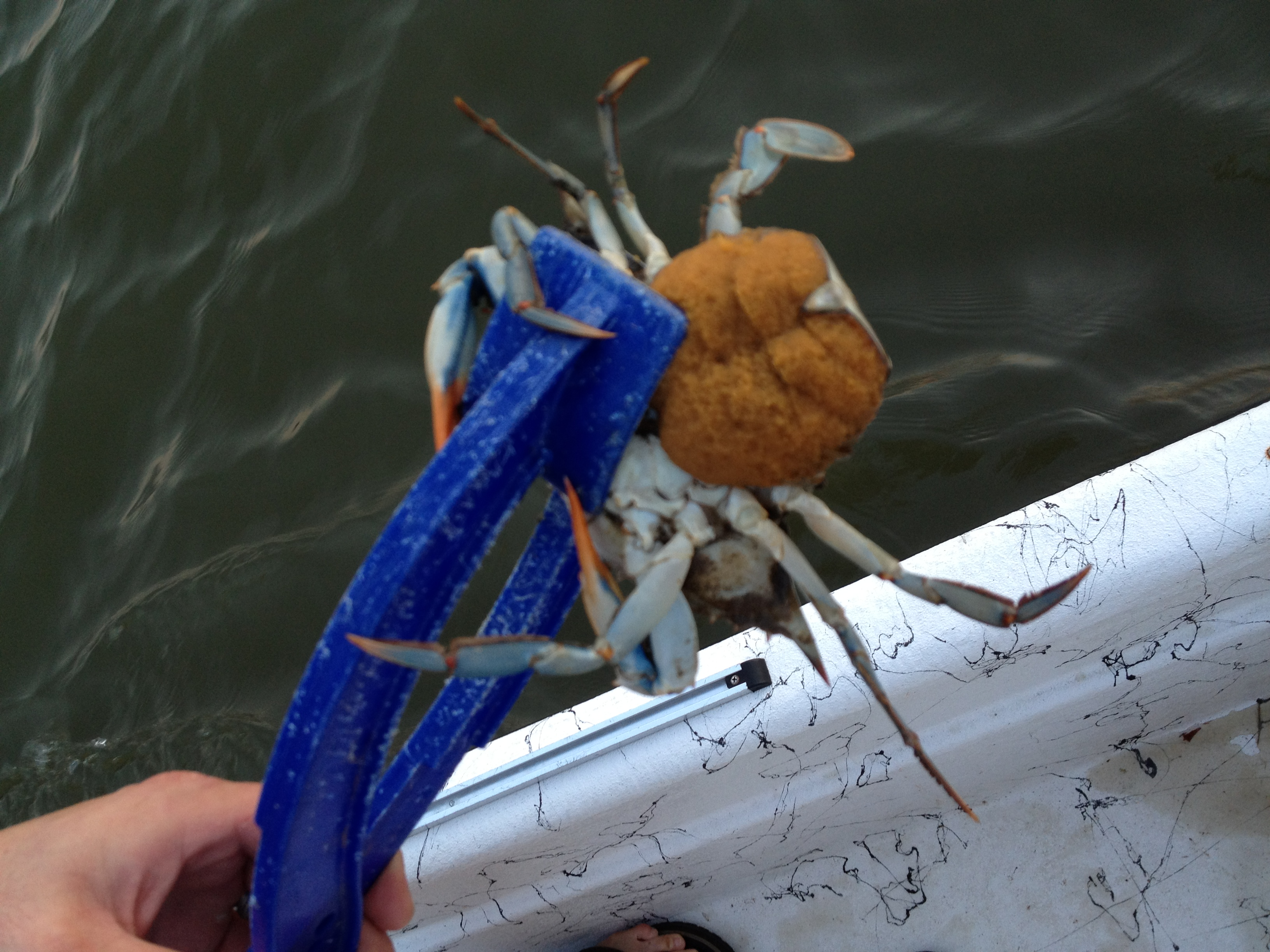
Female blue crab with eggs

Mating and spawning are distinct events in blue crab reproduction. Males may mate several times and undergo no major changes in morphology during the process. Female blue crabs mate only once in their lifetimes during their pubertal, or terminal, molt. During this transition, the abdomen changes from a triangular to a semicircular shape. Mating in blue crab is a complex process that requires precise timing of mating at the time of the female's terminal molt. It generally occurs during the warmest months of the year. Prepubertal females migrate to the upper reaches of estuaries, where males typically reside as adults. To ensure that a male can mate, he actively seeks a receptive female and guards her for up to seven days until she molts, when insemination occurs. Crabs compete with other individuals before, during, and after insemination, so mate guarding is very important for reproductive success. After mating, a male must continue to guard the female until her shell has hardened. Inseminated females retain spermatophores for up to one year, which they use for multiple spawnings in high salinity water. During spawning, a female extrudes fertilized eggs onto her swimmerets and carries them in a large egg mass, or sponge, while they develop. Females migrate to the mouth of the estuary to release the larvae, the timing of which is believed to be influenced by light, tide, and lunar cycles. Blue crabs have high fecundity; females may produce up to 2 million eggs per brood.

Migration and reproduction patterns differ between crab populations along the East Coast and the Gulf of Mexico. A distinct and large-scale migration occurs in Chesapeake Bay, where C. sapidus undergoes a seasonal migration of up to several hundred miles. In the middle and upper parts of the bay, mating peaks in mid- to late summer, while in the lower bay, peaks in mating activity occur during spring and late summer through early fall. Changes in salinity and temperature may impact time of mating because both factors are important during the molting process. After mating, the female crab travels to the southern portion of the Chesapeake, using ebb tides to migrate from areas of low salinity to areas of high salinity, fertilizing her eggs with sperm stored during her single mating months or almost a year before.

Spawning events in the Gulf of Mexico are less pronounced than in estuaries along the East Coast, like the Chesapeake. In northern waters of the Gulf of Mexico, spawning occurs in the spring, summer, and fall, and females generally spawn twice. During spawning, females migrate to high-salinity waters to develop a sponge, and return inland after hatching their larvae. They develop their second sponge inland, and again migrate to the high-salinity waters to hatch the second sponge. After this, they typically do not re-enter the estuary. Blue crabs along the southernmost coast of Texas may spawn year-round.

== Commercial importance ==
=== Range of fisheries ===
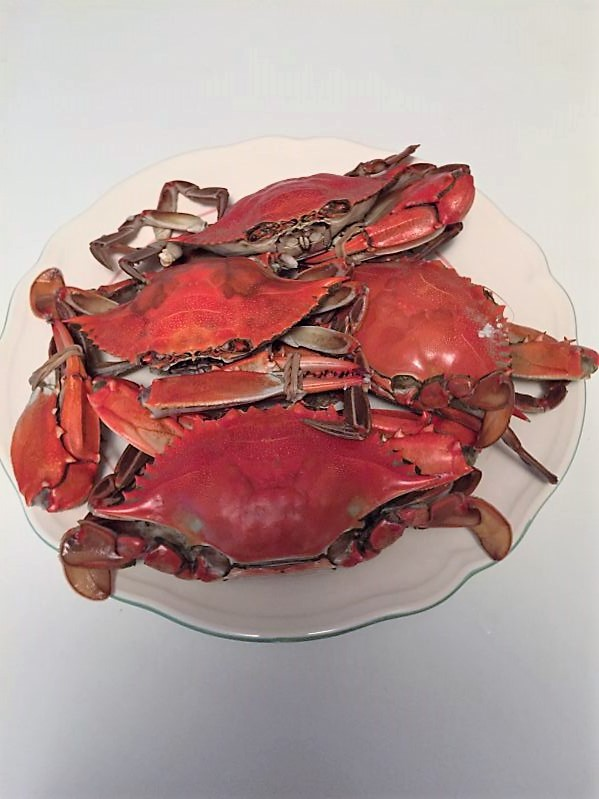
Cooked blue crabs

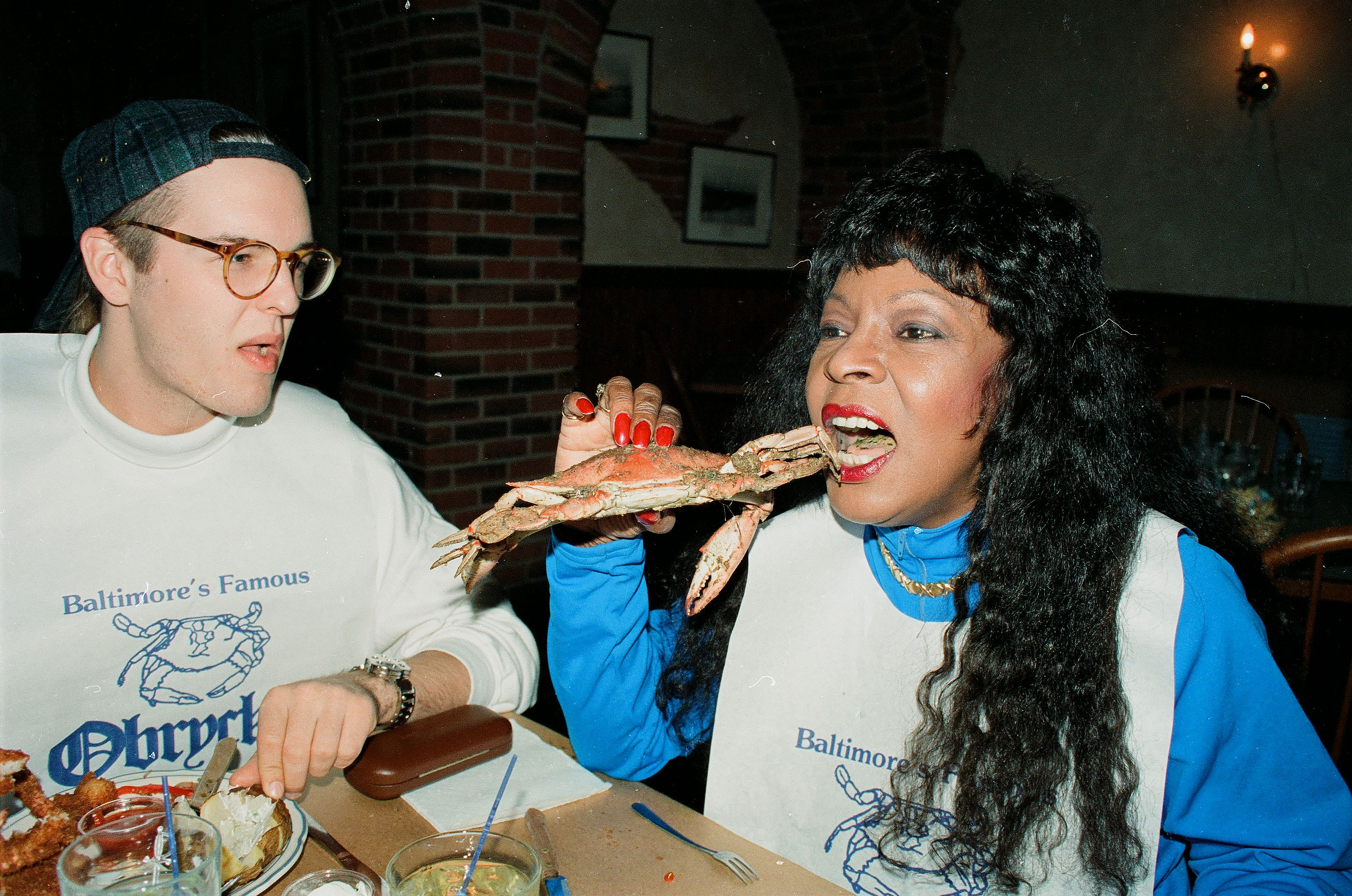
Singer Martha Reeves fake-eating a blue crab (Baltimore, 1996)

Global capture production of Blue crab (Callinectes sapidus) in thousand tonnes from 1950 to 2022, as reported by the FAO

Commercial fisheries for C. sapidus exist along much of the Atlantic coast of the United States, and in the Gulf of Mexico. Although the fishery has been historically centered on the Chesapeake Bay, contributions from other localities are increasing in importance. In the 21st century, most commercial crabs have been landed in four states: Maryland, Virginia, North Carolina, and Louisiana.

=== History of the crab fishery ===
As early as the 1600s, the blue crab was an important food item for Native Americans and English settlers in the Chesapeake Bay area. Soft and hard blue crabs were not as valuable as fish, but gained regional popularity by the 1700s. Throughout their range, crabs were also an effective bait type for hook-and-line fisheries. Rapid perishing limited the distribution and hindered the growth of the fishery. Advances in refrigeration techniques in the late 1800s and early 1900s increased demand for blue crab nationwide.

==== Atlantic Coast ====
The early blue crab fishery along the Atlantic Coast was casual and productive because blue crabs were extremely abundant. In the lower Chesapeake Bay, crabs were even considered a nuisance species because they frequently clogged the nets of seine fishermen. Early on, the blue crab fishery of the Atlantic states was well documented. Atlantic states were the first to regulate the fishery, particularly the Chesapeake states. For example, after observing a slight decline in harvest, the fishing commissions of Virginia and Maryland put size limits into place by 1912 and 1917, respectively. Catch-per-unit-effort at the time was determined by packing houses, or crab processing plants.

==== Gulf of Mexico ====
The early history of the recreational blue crab fishery in the Gulf of Mexico is not well known. Commercial crabbing was first reported in the Gulf of Mexico in the 1880s. Early crab fishermen used long-handled dip nets and drop nets among other simple fishing gear types to trap crabs at night. Blue crab spoiled quickly, which limited distribution and hindered the growth of the fishery for several decades. The first commercial processing plant in Louisiana opened in Morgan City in 1924. Other plants opened soon after, although commercial processing of hard blue crabs was not widespread until World War II.

=== Louisiana fishery ===
Louisiana now has the world's largest blue-crab fishery. Commercial harvests in the state account for over half of all landings in the Gulf of Mexico. The industry was not commercialized for interstate commerce until the 1990s, when supply markedly decreased in Maryland due to problems (see above) in Chesapeake Bay. Since then, Louisiana has steadily increased its harvest. In 2002, Louisiana harvested 22% of the nation's blue crab. That number rose to 26% by 2009 and 28% by 2012. The vast majority of Louisiana crabs are shipped to Maryland, where they are sold as "Chesapeake" or "Maryland" crab. Louisiana's harvest remained high in 2013, with 17,597 metric tons of blue crab valued at $51 million. In addition to commercial harvesting, recreational crabbing is very popular along Louisiana's coast.

Fishery value in millions of US dollars (and percentage of national harvest weight)
Year	Maryland		Virginia		North Carolina		Louisiana		USA
2000	$31	12%	$24	16%	$37	22%	$34	28%	$164
2001	$35	16%	$26	16%	$32	20%	$32	26%	$158
2002	$30	15%	$21	16%	$33	22%	$31	29%	$147
2003	$35	16%	$19	13%	$37	25%	$34	28%	$154
2004	$39	19%	$22	16%	$24	20%	$30	25%	$146
2005	$40	22%	$21	16%	$20	16%	$27	24%	$141
2006	$31	18%	$14	14%	$17	15%	$33	32%	$126
2007	$42	20%	$16	16%	$21	14%	$35	29%	$149
2008	$50	22%	$18	14%	$28	20%	$32	26%	$161
2009	$52	22%	$21	19%	$27	17%	$37	30%	$163
2010	$79	33%	$29	19%	$26	15%	$30	15%	$205
2011	$60	25%	$26	20%	$21	15%	$37	22%	$184
2012	$60	24%	$25	19%	$23	15%	$39	23%	$188
2013	$50	18%	$24	18%	$30	17%	$51	29%	$192

=== Chesapeake Bay fishery ===
The Chesapeake Bay has had the largest blue crab harvest for more than a century. Maryland and Virginia are usually the top two Atlantic coast states in annual landings, followed by North Carolina. In 2013, crab landings were valued at $18.7 million from Maryland waters and $16.1 million from Virginia waters. Although crab populations are currently declining, blue crab fishing in Maryland and Virginia remains a livelihood for thousands of coastal residents. As of 2001, Maryland and Virginia collectively had 4,816 commercial crab license holders. Three separate licenses are required for each of the three major jurisdictional areas: Maryland, the Potomac River, and Virginia waters. While the Bay's commercial sector lands the majority of hard crab landings and nearly all peeler or soft crab landings, the recreational fishery is also significant. In 2013, an estimated 1.8 million kilograms (3.9 million pounds) of blue crab were harvested recreationally.

==== Recent decline ====
Blue crab populations naturally fluctuate with annual changes in environmental conditions. They have been described as having a long-term dynamic equilibrium, which was first noted after irregular landings data in the Chesapeake in 1950. This tendency may have made it difficult for managers to predict the severe decline of the Chesapeake's blue crab populations. Once considered an overwhelmingly abundant annoyance, the declining blue crab population is now the subject of anxiety among fishermen and managers. Over the decade between the mid-1990s to 2004, the population fell from 900 million to around 300 million, and harvest weight fell from 52,000 to 28,000 tonnes (57,000 to 31,000 short tons). Revenue fell further, from $72 million to $61 million. Long-term estimates say that the overall Chesapeake population decreased around 70% in the last few decades. Even more alarming, the number of females capable of reproducing, known as spawning age females, has plummeted 84% in just a few decades. Survival and addition of juveniles to the harvestable crab population is also low. Many factors are to blame for low blue crab numbers, including high fishing pressure, environmental degradation, and disease prevalence. The 2018 reduction in H-2B visas available for seasonal workers is affecting Maryland's 20 crab processors, which typically employ about 500 foreign workers, but the effect this will have on the crab fishery is not yet clear.

=== Crabbing gear ===
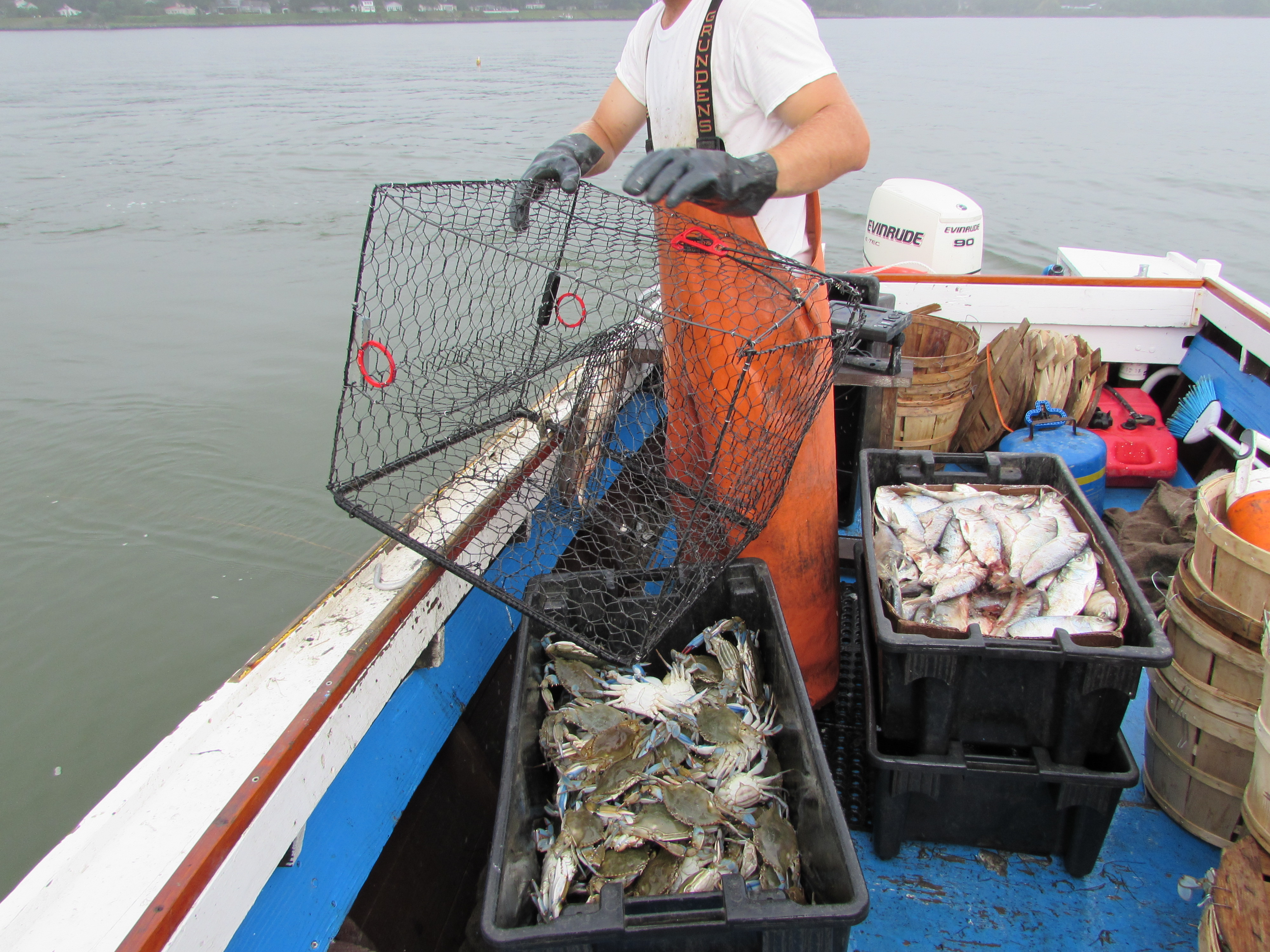
Blue crab pot

Many types of gear have been used to catch blue crabs along the Atlantic and Gulf Coasts. Initially, people used very simple techniques and gear, which included hand lines, dip nets, and push nets among a variety of other gear types. The trotline, a long baited twine set in waters 5–15 feet deep, was the first major gear type used commercially to target hard crabs. Use of commercial trotlines is now mostly limited to the tributaries of the Chesapeake Bay. In the Gulf of Mexico, trotline use drastically declined after invention of the crab pot in 1938. Crab pots are rigid, box-like traps made of hexagonal or square wire mesh. They possess between two and four funnels that extend into the trap, with the smaller end of the funnel inside of the trap. A central compartment made of smaller wire mesh holds bait. Crabs attracted by odorant plumes from the bait, often an oily fish, enter the trap through the funnels and cannot escape.

==== Bycatch ====
Species other than blue crab are often caught incidentally in crab pots, including fish, turtles, conch, and other crab species. In Georgia, hermit crabs (Pagurus spp.), channeled whelk (Busycon canaliculatum), spider crabs (Libinia spp.), and stone crabs (Menippe mercenaria) were the most common species observed as bycatch in commercial crab pots. Of important concern is the diamondback terrapin, Malaclemys terrapin. The blue crab and diamondback terrapin have overlapping ranges along the East and Gulf Coasts of the United States. Because the funnels in a crab pot are flexible, small terrapins may easily enter and become entrapped. Traps are checked every 24 hours or less, frequently resulting in drowning and death of terrapins. Crab pot bycatch may reduce local terrapin populations to less than half. To reduce terrapin entrapment, bycatch reduction devices (BRDs) may be installed on each of the funnels in a crab pot. BRDs effectively reduce bycatch (and subsequently mortality) of small terrapins without affecting blue crab catch.

=== Efforts to manage fisheries ===
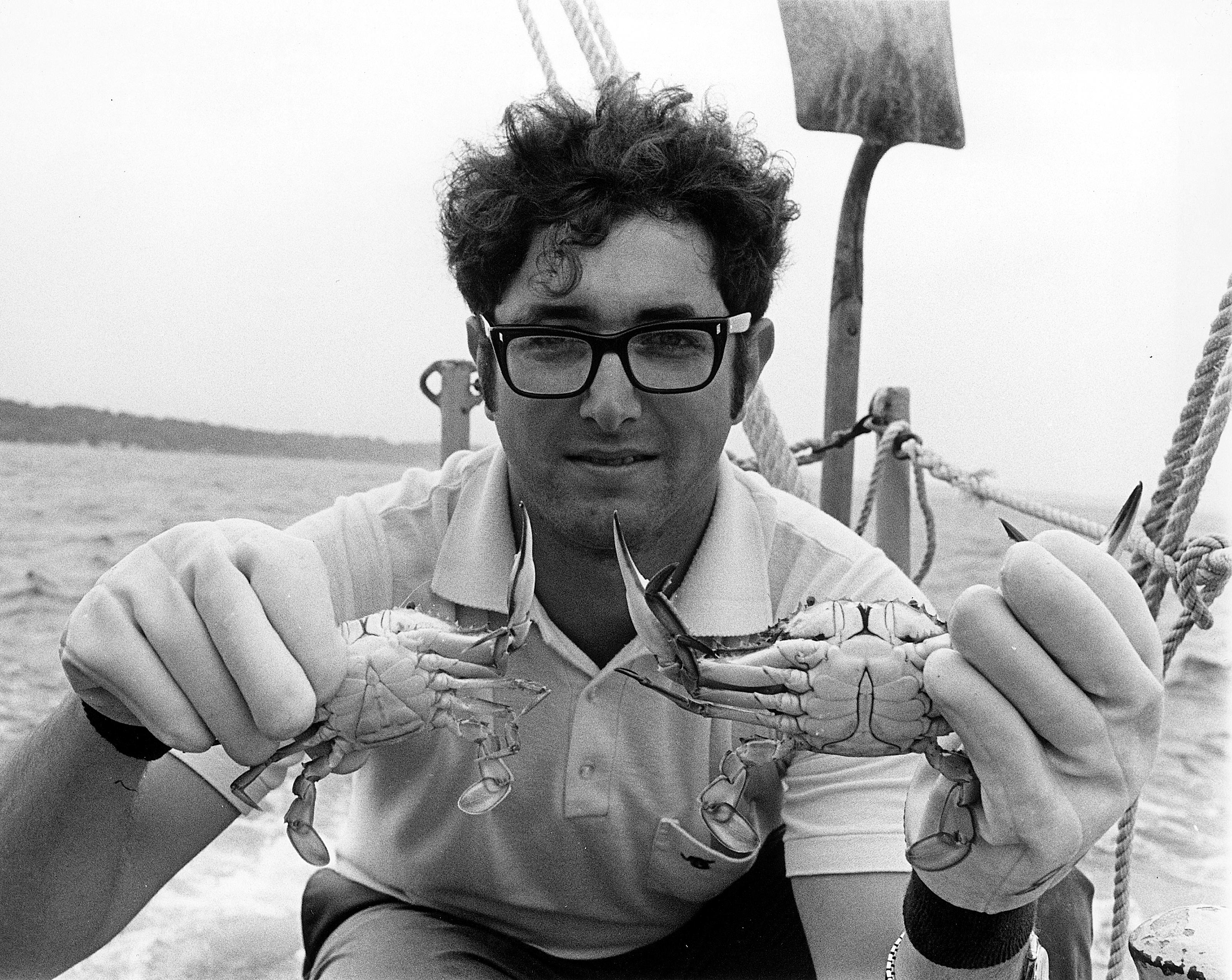
A scientist holding a female (left) and male (right) Maryland blue crab (Chesapeake Bay, 1972)

Because of its commercial and environmental value, C. sapidus is the subject of management plans over much of its range. In 2012, the C. sapidus population in Louisiana was recognized as a certified sustainable fishery by the Marine Stewardship Council. It was the first and remains the only certified sustainable blue crab fishery worldwide. For the state to maintain its certification, it must undergo annual monitoring and conduct a full re-evaluation five years after the certification date.

== Sports ==
The blue crab is the namesake of the Jersey Shore BlueClaws team in minor-league baseball playing in the South Atlantic League. They are located in Lakewood, New Jersey, and are a high-A affiliate of the Philadelphia Phillies.

Blue crabs are also the namesake of the Southern Maryland Blue Crabs, a professional baseball team located in Waldorf, Maryland.

Blue crabs inspired the branding of the Annapolis Blues Football Club in Annapolis, Maryland.

== See also ==
- Beautiful Swimmers, a Pulitzer Prize-winning book with an extensive discussion of the crabs and their lifecycle
- Chesapeake (novel), by James Michener with a story about C. sapidus titled "Jimmy the crab"
- Crab cake
- She-crab soup
- Soft-shell crab
