= List of invasive species in Colombia =

Parques Nacionales Naturales de Colombia, the governmental organization that oversees and manages national parks in Colombia, has provided an official list of species that are considered to be invasive under the following resolutions:

- Resolution 848 of 2008
- Resolution 132 of 2010
- Resolution 207 of 2010
- Resolution 654 of 2011
- Resolution 346 of 2022

There are also additional species listed below from more recent sources.

== Species ==
Species officially declared as invasive are shown in bold.

=== Invertebrates ===
- Aedes albopictus (tiger mosquito)
- Anastrepha fraterculus (South American fruit fly)
- Aphis spiraecola (green citrus aphid)
- **Callinectes exasperatus** (rugose swimming crab)
- Cerataphis lataniae (palm aphid)
- Ceratitis capitata (Mediterranean fruit fly)
- **Charybdis hellerii** (blue jaiba crab)
- Cinara cupressi (cypress aphid)
- Corbicula fluminea (Asian basket clam)
- **Cornu aspersum** (garden snail)
- Cryptotermes brevis (West Indian drywood termite)
- Ctenarytaina eucalypti (blue gum psyllid)
- Deroceras invadens (tramp slug)
- Deroceras laeve (marsh slug)
- **Electroma** sp., a genus of Vulsellidae
- Icerya purchasi (cottony cushion scale)
- Linepithema humile (Argentine ant)
- **Lissachatina fulica** (giant African snail)
- Maconellicoccus hirsutus (hibiscus mealybug)
- Melanoides tuberculata (red-rimmed melania)
- Monomorium pharaonis (pharaoh ant)
- **Paratrechina fulva** (crazy ant)
- **Penaeus monodon** (Asian tiger shrimp)
- Pheidole megacephala (big-headed ant)
- Phenacoccus solenopsis (cotton mealybug)
- Procambarus clarkii (red swamp crayfish)
- Raoiella indica (red palm mite)
- Tetranychus urticae (mite)

=== Fish ===
- **Cyprinus carpio** (common carp)
- **Micropterus salmoides** (largemouth bass)
- **Oncorhynchus mykiss** (rainbow trout)
- **Oreochromis mossambicus** (black tilapia)
- **Oreochromis niloticus** (Nile tilapia)
- **Pterois volitans** (red lionfish)
- **Salmo trutta** (brown trout)
- **Trichogaster pectoralis** (snakeskin gourami)

=== Amphibians ===
- **Eleutherodactylus coqui** (common coquí)
- Eleutherodactylus johnstonei (Johnstone's whistling frog)
- **Lithobates catesbeianus** (American bullfrog)

=== Mammals ===
- Canis familiaris (domestic dog)
- Felis catus (cats)
- **Hippopotamus amphibius** (hippopotamus; see hippopotamus in Colombia)
- Rattus norvegicus (brown rat)
- Rattus rattus (black rat)

=== Birds ===
- Columba livia (rock dove)
- Lonchura malacca (tricoloured munia)
- Passer domesticus (house sparrow)

=== Flora ===
- **Eichornia crassipes** (common water hyacinth)
- **Kappaphycus alvarezii** (elkhorn sea moss)
- **Melinis minutiflora** (molasses grass)
- **Teline monspessulana** (French broom)
- **Ulex europaeus** (common gorse)

== See also ==
- Fauna of Colombia
- Flora of Colombia
- Hippopotamus in Colombia
