= Hippopotamuses in Colombia =

Hippos owned by Colombian drug lord Pablo Escobar

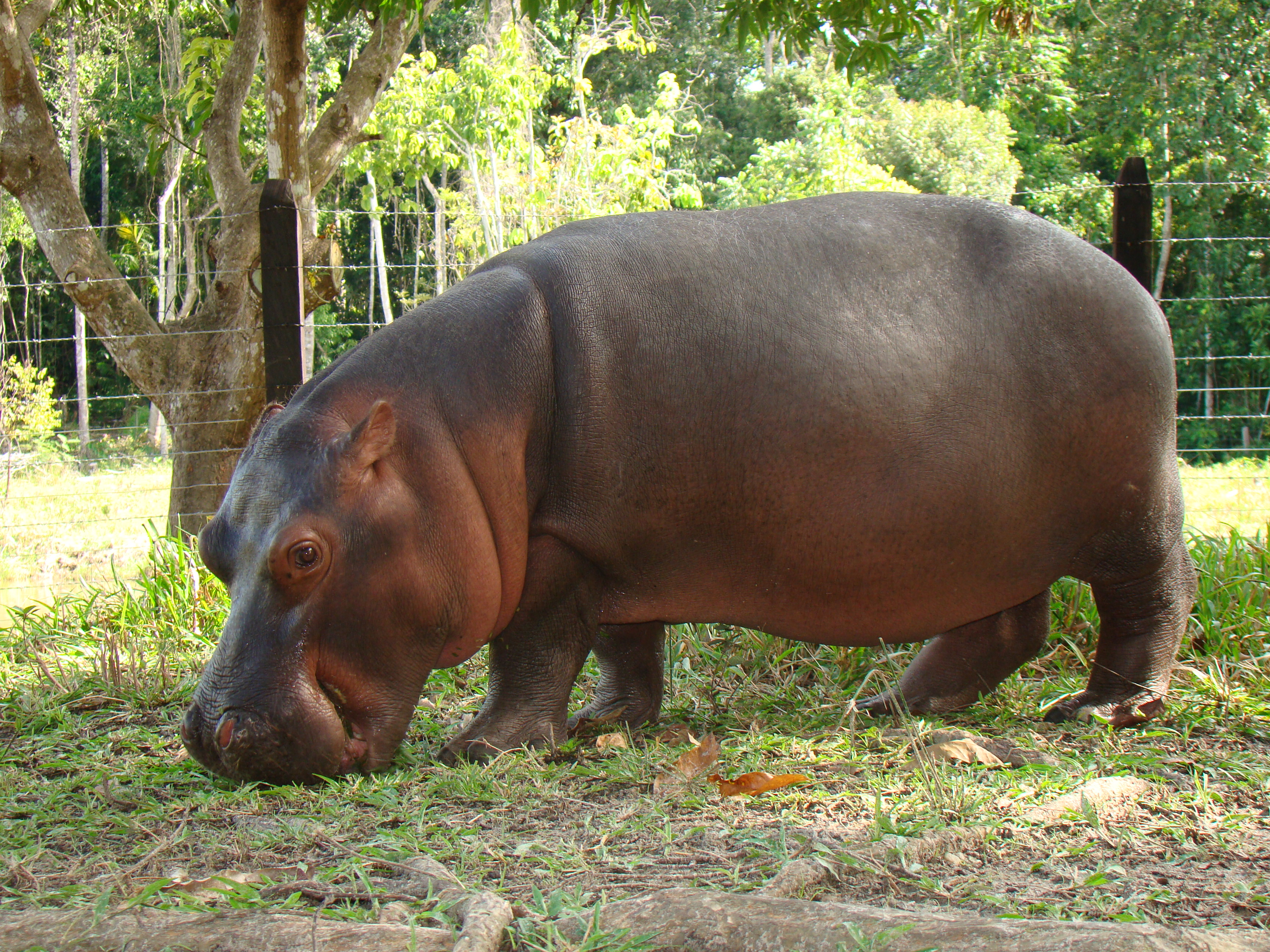
Vanessa, a hippo residing at Hacienda Nápoles

Hippopotamuses are an introduced species in Colombia. Four hippopotamuses were first kept by the drug lord Pablo Escobar in his private zoo in the early 1980s, and upon his death in 1993, they were allowed to wander his unattended estate. The hippos eventually broke out of the estate and, being too difficult to contain, were left to roam the area.

By 2026, their population has grown to around two hundred individuals, causing concerns about harming the native flora and fauna in the area, as well as posing a significant threat to people.

== History ==
In the early 1980s, Colombian drug lord Pablo Escobar visited a wildlife breeding center in Dallas, Texas, to strike a deal to adopt four hippopotamuses. In 1981, four hippos, three females and one male, were imported by Escobar to his private menagerie at his residence in Hacienda Nápoles, located between the cities of Medellín and Bogotá. After Escobar's 1993 death, the zoo was unofficially closed, but the hippos would later escape the residence and spread out to nearby areas.

By 2007, the animals had multiplied to 16 and had taken to roaming the area for food in the nearby Magdalena River. In early 2014, there were reported to be 40 hippopotamuses in Puerto Triunfo, Antioquia.

The estimated population in December 2019 was around 90–120, with their range covering around 2,250 km^{2} (870 mi^{2}) and now extending into the department of Santander; it was expected that the population would almost certainly increase to more than 150 individuals within a decade and could reach up to more than 200 hippos, while the range eventually could cover more than 13,500 km^{2} (5,200 mi^{2}). Population projections estimate that there could be thousands within a few decades. The Colombian hippos reach sexual maturity earlier than African hippos. Another study in 2023 revealed the number of existing hippos to be even higher than previously estimated, with already between 181 and 215 individuals.

As of April 2026, the population was around 200, with the Colombian Environmental Ministry warning that the number of hippos would exceed 500 by 2030 without intervention. To prevent this, the government developed a plan to euthanize approximately 80 hippos, leading to considerable controversy within Colombia.

=== Conflict with citizens ===
Locals have reported "mock attacks" on humans, but as of 2017 none had been fatal or resulted in serious injury.

On June 18, 2009, a hippopotamus named Pepe was killed by hunters under authorization of the government. Authorities of the department of Antioquia had declared the hippo as a threat and health risk to farmers and fisherman, and ordered him to be killed. When a photo of the dead hippo surrounded by 15 armed men became public, it caused considerable controversy among animal rights groups both within the country and abroad. Protesters picketed the Environment Ministry and expressed their opposition to the upcoming plan to kill two other hippos, Matilda, and her baby Hip. Further plans of culling ceased, until April 13th of 2026 when Irene Vélez, Colombia's environment minister, announced that the government aims to cull approximately 80 hippos due to the risks to people and primarily the ongoing threat to biodiversity they pose.

== Conservation concerns ==
Being non-native introductions, most conservationists considered them problematic and invasive in Colombia, as they have the potential to change various ecosystems, feeding heavily on plants and displacing native species like the West Indian manatee, neotropical otter, spectacled caiman and turtles. The critically endangered Dahl's toad-headed turtle and Magdalena River turtle are largely restricted to the Magdalena River basin, as are many threatened fish. In 2020, a study showed that there was an increase in the nutrient levels and cyanobacteria in Colombian lakes inhabited by hippos. Cyanobacteria can cause algae blooms and die-offs of aquatic fauna. Despite the limited magnitude of the observed change, it was notable since the species' population was still quite small.

This increase in nutrient levels is because of their behavior; during the day, they spend their time wallowing in the river, and during the night, they are on land grazing. With this constant movement, an individual hippo can transport up to 750 kilograms (1,650 lb) dry mass per year of carbon and nutrients from land to water through their waste. Additionally, their movements can also significantly impact the geomorphology and hydrology of the Magdalena River. When they wallow through dense, vegetated areas, they end up creating paths which form or connect ponds to the river that will later fill up with sediment due to flooding. This damages the habitat of many aquatic plants and animals as these ponds are mainly used for nursery purposes to protect the offspring from larger predators that live in the river.

In contrast to the opposition by most conservationists, some ecologists have argued that the hippos should remain and might even have a positive effect on the local environment. It has been suggested that the nutrients they introduce to the water and the occasional fish kills caused by them are overall positive, but this was based on a study in their native Africa. Alternatively, the introduced hippos could be a form of Pleistocene rewilding project, replacing species like Toxodon that became extinct in prehistoric times, but Pleistocene rewilding itself is highly controversial. Others have argued that the Colombian hippos should be regarded as a safe population, isolated from the threats faced by African hippos, and that they could be beneficial to the local ecotourism industry.

== Control efforts ==
Alternative methods for controlling the hippo population have been considered, but they are unproven, or difficult and expensive. In 2017 a wild male hippo was caught, castrated and released again, with an overall cost of about US$50,000.

In 2020, there were no plans by the local government to manage the population, but further studies on their effect on the habitat have been initiated. Because of the fast-growing population, conservationists recommended that a management plan needed to be rapidly developed.

By October 2021, the Colombian government had started a program to sterilize the hippos using a chemical to make them infertile. The approach uses an anti-GnRH vaccine known as GonaCon. Such vaccines turn the immune system against GnRH, a hormone important for sex organ function. During this time, both national and international animal rights movements surrounding the hippo population had increased. As such, in an effort to protect the hippos, a lawsuit was filed which explored the interests of the hippos in relation to their management.

In March 2023, it was announced that the Colombian government is proposing transferring at least 70 hippopotamuses to India and Mexico as part of a plan to control their population. Authorities estimated that 170 hippos inhabited the country at the time and that they could potentially increase to 1,000 by the year 2035.

In November 2023 the Colombian Environment Minister, Susana Muhamad, announced plans to manage the invasive hippo population. This strategy involves three measures, the sterilization of around 40 hippos a year, in addition to translocation and culling measures which were still being explored, citing environmental concerns. In August 2024, the Administrative Court of Cundinamarca gave the Ministry of Environment three months to issue a proper "regulation that contemplates measures for the eradication of the species," on the basis that the hippos were affecting the area's "ecological balance."

== Euthanasia ==
On April 13, 2026, the Colombian Ministry of Environment approved the euthanasia of the more than 80 hippos that make up the invasive population with an investment of COP$7,200 million and delegated to the regional autonomous corporations Cornare, Corantioquia, Corpoboyacá and CAS. Indian billionaire Anant Ambani offered transportation and shelter in India for the animals.

== Media ==
In 2013, the National Geographic Channel produced a documentary about the species in Colombia titled Cocaine Hippos.

In series 3 of The Grand Tour, the presenters went to Colombia to photograph wildlife, including the hippos.

== See also ==
- List of invasive species in Colombia
