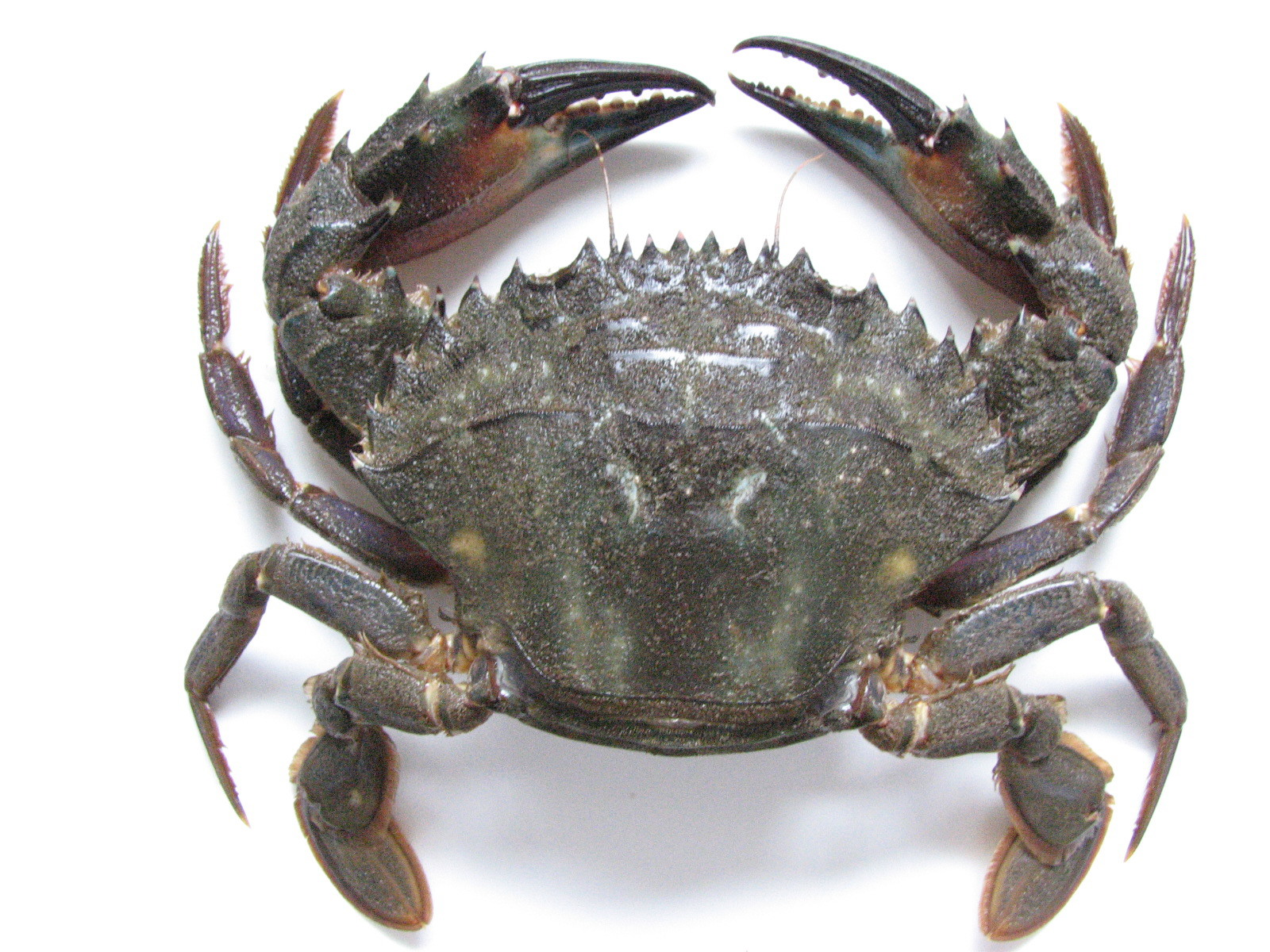
- Charybdis japonica

Scientific classification
- Domain: Eukaryota
- Kingdom: Animalia
- Phylum: Arthropoda
- Class: Malacostraca
- Order: Decapoda
- Suborder: Pleocyemata
- Infraorder: Brachyura
- Family: Portunidae
- Subfamily: Thalamitinae
- Genus: Charybdis; De Haan, 1833

Type species
- Cancer sexdentatus Herbst, 1783

Species
- See text

= Charybdis (crab) =

Genus of crabs

Charybdis is a genus of swimming crabs in the family Portunidae. It is named after the monster Charybdis of Greek mythology.

== Species ==
The genus Charybdis contains the following species:

Subgenus Charybdis (Charybdis) De Haan, 1833

- Charybdis acuta (A. Milne-Edwards, 1869)
- Charybdis acutidens Türkay, 1986
- Charybdis affinis Dana, 1852
- Charybdis amboinensis Leene, 1938
- Charybdis anisodon (De Haan, 1850)
- Charybdis annulata (Fabricius, 1798)
- Charybdis beauforti Leene & Buitendijk, 1949
- Charybdis brevispinosa Leene, 1937
- Charybdis callianassa (Herbst, 1789)
- Charybdis cookei Rathbun, 1923
- Charybdis crosnieri Spiridonov & Türkay, 2001
- Charybdis curtilobus Stephenson & Rees, 1967
- Charybdis demani Leene, 1937
- Charybdis feriata (Linnaeus, 1758)
- Charybdis gordonae Shen, 1934
- Charybdis granulata (De Haan, 1833)
- Charybdis hawaiensis Edmondson, 1954
- Charybdis hellerii (A. Milne-Edwards, 1867)
- Charybdis heterodon Nobili, 1905
- Charybdis holosericus (Fabricius, 1787)
- Charybdis ihlei Leene & Buitendijk, 1949
- Charybdis incisa Rathbun, 1923
- Charybdis japonica (A. Milne-Edwards, 1861)
- Charybdis jaubertensis Rathbun, 1924
- Charybdis javaensis Zarenkov, 1970
- Charybdis lucifer (Fabricius, 1798)
- Charybdis meteor Spiridonov & Türkay, 2001
- Charybdis miles (De Haan, 1835)
- Charybdis natator (Herbst, 1794)
- Charybdis orientalis Dana, 1852
- Charybdis padadiana Ward, 1941
- Charybdis philippinensis Ward, 1941
- Charybdis rathbuni Leene, 1938
- Charybdis riversandersoni Alcock, 1899
- Charybdis rosea (Hombron & Jacquinot, 1846)
- Charybdis rostrata (A. Milne-Edwards, 1861)
- Charybdis rufodactylus Stephenson & Rees, 1968
- Charybdis sagamiensis Parisi, 1916
- Charybdis salehensis Leene, 1938
- Charybdis seychellensis Crosnier, 1984
- Charybdis spinifera (Edward J. Miers|Miers, 1884)
- Charybdis vannamei Ward, 1941
- Charybdis variegata (Fabricius, 1798)
- Charybdis yaldwyni Rees & Stephenson, 1967

Subgenus Charybdis (Goniohellenus) Alcock, 1899

- Charybdis curtidentata Stephenson, 1967
- Charybdis hongkongensis Shen, 1934
- Charybdis hoplites (Wood-Mason, 1877)
- Charybdis longicollis Leene, 1938
- Charybdis omanensis Leene, 1938
- Charybdis ornata (A. Milne-Edwards, 1861)
- Charybdis padangensis Leene & Buitendijk, 1952
- Charybdis philippinensis Ward, 1941
- Charybdis pusilla Alcock, 1899
- Charybdis smithii MacLeay, 1838
- Charybdis truncata (Fabricius, 1798)
- Charybdis vadorum Alcock, 1899

Subgenus Charybdis (Gonioneptunus) Ortmann, 1894

- Charybdis africana Shen, 1935
- Charybdis bimaculata (Miers, 1886)
- Charybdis orlik Zarenkov, 1970

Subgenus Charybdis (Goniosupradens) Leene, 1938

- Charybdis acutifrons (De Man, 1879)
- Charybdis erythrodactyla (Lamarck, 1818)
- Charybdis obtusifrons Leene, 1937

Incertae sedis

- Charybdis paucidentata (A. Milne-Edwards)
- Charybdis sexdentata (Herbst, 1783)

=== Charybdis affinis ===
Charybdis affinis has a hexagonal, concave carapace with a yellowish-grey colour. This crab is found in the Indian Ocean and in the West Pacific.

=== Charybdis feriata ===
Charybdis feriata is found in the Indian and Pacific Oceans, from Japan, China and Australia to Southern Africa and the Persian Gulf. It is an edible crab and because of its large size, high quality of meat and relatively soft exoskeleton, it has a high commercial value. Attempts are being made to farm this crab using aquaculture. In Hong Kong Cantonese it is known as the flowery crab (花蟹). This name probably arises from its red and white colouring when cooked. This species of crab is also known as Charybdis feriatus and Charybdis cruciata, and has also been found in the Mediterranean Sea. The specific epithet cruciata refers to the red cross on the carapace of this species. According to tradition the Spanish Jesuit missionary Saint Francis Xavier saw this crab in Indonesia. "A Ceram, écrit François-Xavier, un crabe sur la plage me rapporta entre ses pinces mon crucifix qu'une tempête avait arraché à mon cou. Depuis, en cette région, les crabes ont un crucifix imprimé sur leur carapace".

=== Charybdis hellerii ===
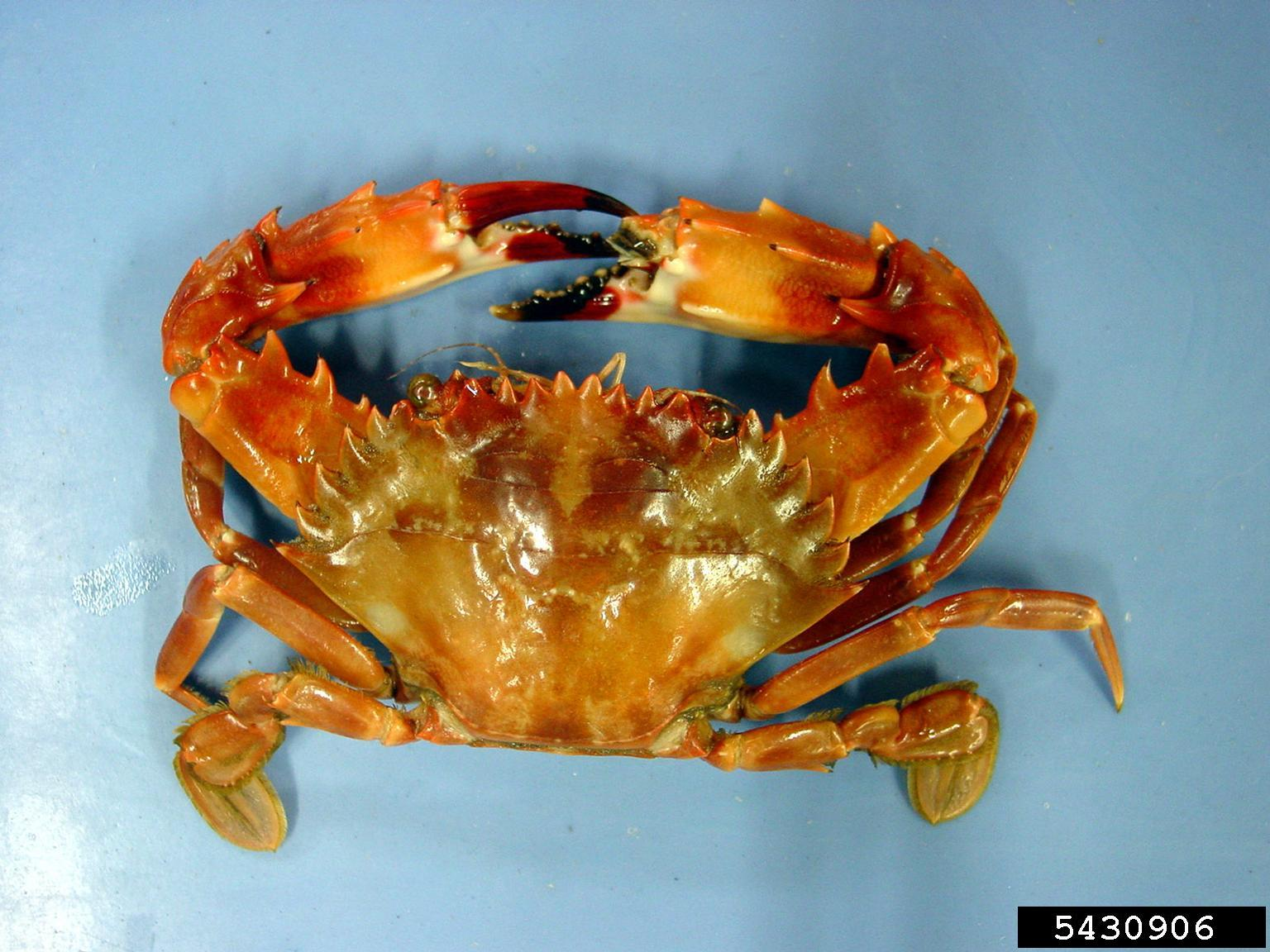
Charybdis hellerii

Charybdis hellerii is characterised by a hexagonal, concave carapace with a mottled brownish-grey colour. This crab originates from the Indo-West Pacific, from the Red Sea to New Caledonia. However this crab has now also successively invaded the Western Atlantic (Florida to Brazil) and the Mediterranean Sea.

=== Charybdis japonica ===
Charybdis japonica has a hexagonal, concave carapace around 12 centimetres (4.7 in) wide, the whole animal being pale green to olive green in colour. It occurs naturally in the waters around Japan, Korea and Malaysia, but has become an invasive species in New Zealand.

=== Charybdis lucifer ===
Charybdis (Charybdis) lucifer, the Yellowish-brown crab, is a species of swimming crab in the family Portunidae. The type locality of this species is Indian Ocean, probably Tranquebar. It occurs naturally in the waters around Bangladesh, Malaysia, India, Singapore, Pakistan, Sri Lanka, Indonesia, Taiwan, Thailand, Australia, Italy (Invasive species), Egypt (Invasive species), Mediterranean Sea (Invasive species).

=== Charybdis longicollis ===
Charybdis longicollis is an invasive species from the Red Sea that invaded the Mediterranean Sea fifty years ago.

=== Charybdis natator ===
Charybdis natator is characterised by a brownish upper surface with some white spots among the wafts or bright red granules. On its under surface it is bluish, mottled with white and pale red. This crab is not a major target for commercial fishing.

=== Charybdis miles ===
Though Charybdis miles was originally designated as its own species, it now actually refers to a group of different species including C. acutidens, C. meteor, C. riversandersoni, C. crosnieri, and C. sagamiensis. Unlike most portunid crabs, most species belonging to this group inhabit the deep sea.
