= Charybdis longicollis =

Scientific classification
- Kingdom: Animalia
- Phylum: Arthropoda
- Clade: Pancrustacea
- Class: Malacostraca
- Order: Decapoda
- Suborder: Pleocyemata
- Infraorder: Brachyura
- Family: Portunidae
- Genus: Charybdis
- Species: C. longicollis

Binomial name
- Charybdis longicollis Leene, 1938

Species of crab

Charybdis longicollis, the lesser swimming crab, is a species of crab from the swimming crab family, the Portunidae. It has a native range which covers the north-western Indian Ocean and it has invaded the Mediterranean Sea by Lessepsian migration through the Suez Canal.

== Description ==
Charybdis longicollis has a convex, hexagonal carapace which is covered with both dense and thin hairs. It is marked with granulated transverse lines in the frontal, protogastric, mesogastric and gill regions. The frontal margin is divided into six teeth, sharpest on the outside. The latero-anterior margin has six teeth, the first four of which are square and separated by deep incisions with serrated outer edges. The posterior teeth are twice as wide as the other teeth and have a lanceolate shape. The basal antennal article is expanded, with 5-8 granules. It has highly developed, robust chelipeds and are thinly coated with hair, granulated, show a carpus spine on the inner margin and three small lumps on the distal portion. The dorsal surface of the claw has an inner surface equipped with two pins and an external surface with a squaliform granule; further squaliform granule is located on the proximal carpal joint. The ventral surface is scaly. The posterior margin of the merus of the fifth pereopod has a strong subdistal spine. The posterior margin of the pleopods are denticulate, with an oval dactyl.

The colour of the carapace is greenish-brown except for the margins and embossed granules which are paler in colour while the interior margins of the limbs are mustard coloured. The pereopods are brownish-grey with bluish-purple margins. The carapace length is from 2.5 to 3 cm.

== Distribution ==
Charybdis longicollis is found in the north western Indian Ocean in the Red Sea and the Persian Gulf. It was first recorded in the Mediterranean off south eastern Turkey at two sites in April and May 1959 and was already found in some numbers. Subsequently, examination of specimens in museums showed that the species had become established in Turkish waters some time prior to its identification in 1959. It was recorded off Israel for the first time in 1961 where it was so abundant that it had become a pest to local fishermen by fouling their nets. It was recorded from the Mediterranean coasts of Egypt soon after and by 1972 was one of the most abundant species of crab on the south-eastern Mediterranean and has expanded as far as Greece.

== Biology ==
Charybdis longicollis is found commonly at all depths between 8m and 200m over muddy or fine sandy substrates. It is a benthophagic species which prefers to feed on slow moving or stationary prey such as molluscs, crustacean and fish, the ingestion of microplastic beads has also been noted. Off the coast of Israel C. longicollis is very abundant and can make up to 70% of the total biomass in suitable habitat. However, in 1992 the Rhizocephalan parasitic barnacle Heterosaccus dollfusi was found to be infecting a few crabs collected off Israel and within three years the infection had spread to Turkey. In 1995 77% of the crabs collected in Haifa Bay were infected. This rapid increase and high infection rate is attributed to the extremely high population density of the host and the year round reproduction of the parasite. Despite very high rates of infection the population has not declined as expected and it has been suggested that the depletion of rays in these waters may have led to a severe reduction in predation pressure on the crabs which combined with the high fecundity shown by the pool of uninfected crabs enables the high populations to be maintained.
