= Leene =

Leene is a Dutch surname. Notable people with the surname include:

- Bernard Leene (1903–1988), Dutch track cyclist and resistance fighter
- Jentina E. Leene (1906–1994), Dutch scientist
