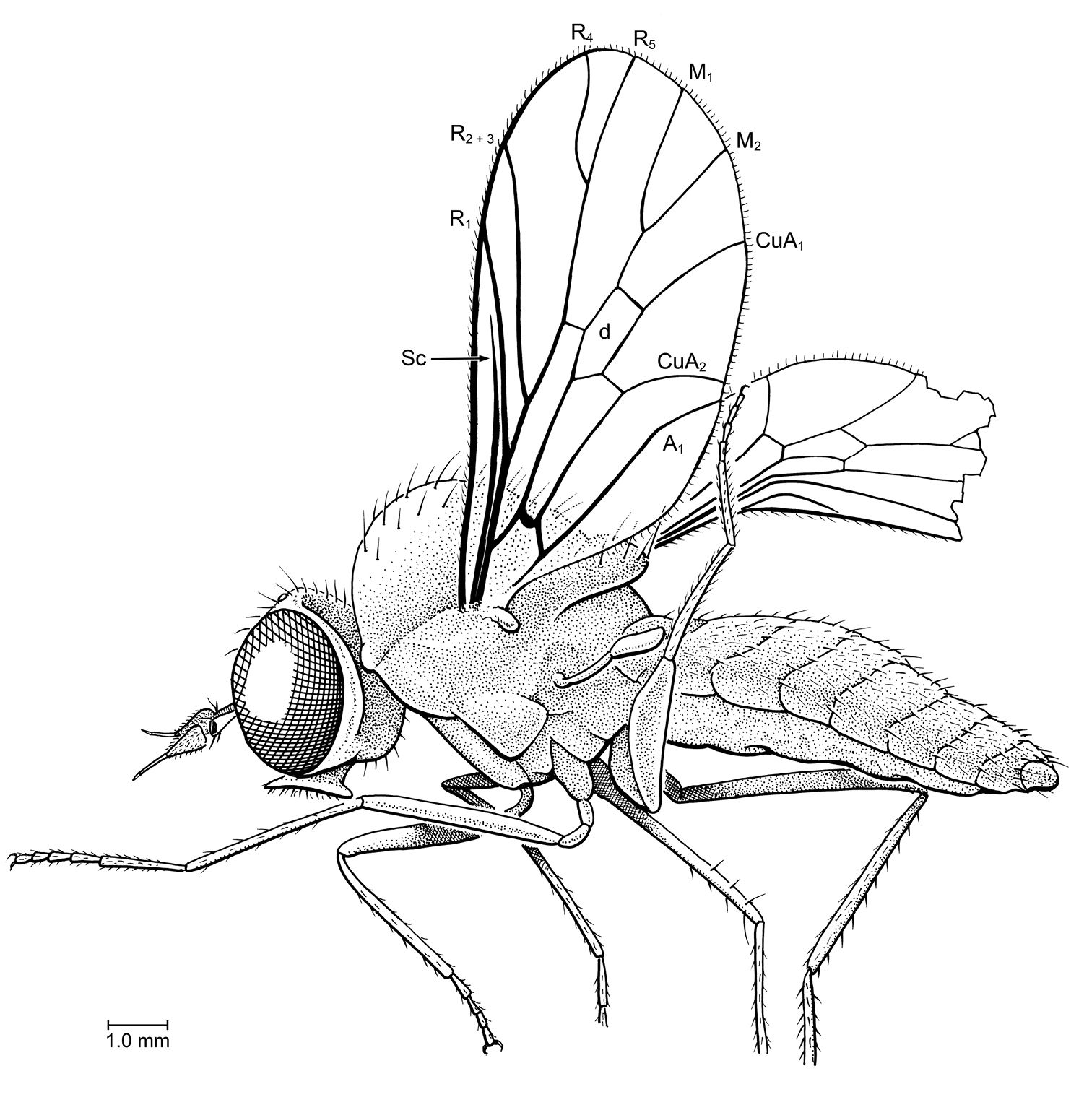
- Hilarimorphites burmanica from Burmese amber

Scientific classification
- Kingdom: Animalia
- Phylum: Arthropoda
- Clade: Pancrustacea
- Class: Insecta
- Order: Diptera
- Clade: Eremoneura
- Family: Apystomyiidae; Nagatomi & Liu, 1994

Genera
- †Apystomimus; Apystomyia Melander, 1950; †Hilarimorphites

= Apystomyiidae =

Apystomyiidae Temporal range: Oxfordian - Recent

Family of flies

Apystomyiidae is a small family of flies containing the living genus Apystomyia and the extinct genera Apystomimus and Hilarimorphites. The single living Apystomyiidae species, Apystomyia elinguis, is native to California. Species of Hilarimorphites have been described from Mid to late Cretaceous Burmese and New Jersey ambers, while the single Apystomimus species is from the Late Jurassic of Kazakhstan.

== Taxonomy ==
The genus Apystomyia was first collected in the 1940s, described in 1950 and long placed into the bee-fly family Bombyliidae. The first specimens seen after the 1940s type series were collected in 2005. A study in 1993 suggested the genus was a sister-group to Eremoneura, while placement of the genus into Hilarimorphidae or allied to Therevidae was suggested in 1994. Conversely a new family, Apystomyiidae, was erected for the genus by Nagatomi and Liu based on the distinct structure of the male and female terminalia. They suggested a closer relationship with Cyclorrhapha. This placement was solidified and refined via molecular phylogenetic studies in 2010 which placed the genus as a sister of the Cyclorrhapha within the clade Eremoneura.

Hilarimorphites was originally placed into the family Hilarimorphidae, but the wing morphology is closer to that of Apystomyia. Similarly Apystomimus was first placed as incertae sedis in the fly infraorder Asilomorpha, though noted as being near Apystomyia in relationship. both extinct genera have very similar wing structure, and are distinguished by the notably large cerci of Apystomimus zaitzevi, combined with the smaller wing-to-body ratio compared to that seen in Hilarimorphites.

The group existed as a clade or stem grade on Laurasia from the Late Jurassic Karatau Lagerstätte of Kazakhstan through the middle Cretaceous Burmese amber forest. The Late Cretaceous New Jersey amber forest species are the oldest members of the clade in North America and the family is now reduced to a relic modern range scattered in California.
