= Apystomyia =

Scientific classification
- Kingdom: Animalia
- Phylum: Arthropoda
- Clade: Pancrustacea
- Class: Insecta
- Order: Diptera
- Family: Apystomyiidae
- Genus: Apystomyia; Melander, 1950
- Species: A. elinguis

Binomial name
- Apystomyia elinguis Melander, 1950

Genus of flies

Apystomyia is a genus of flies in the family Apystomyiidae. The genus contains the single living Apystomyiidae species, Apystomyia elinguis, which is primarily found in California. Details of its life history are largely unknown. The extinct genus Hilarimorphites is known from the Cretaceous Burmese and New Jersey ambers. Formerly placed in the Asiloidea, molecular phylogenetic studies in 2010 placed the genus unambiguously as a sister of the Cyclorrhapha within the clade Eremoneura.
