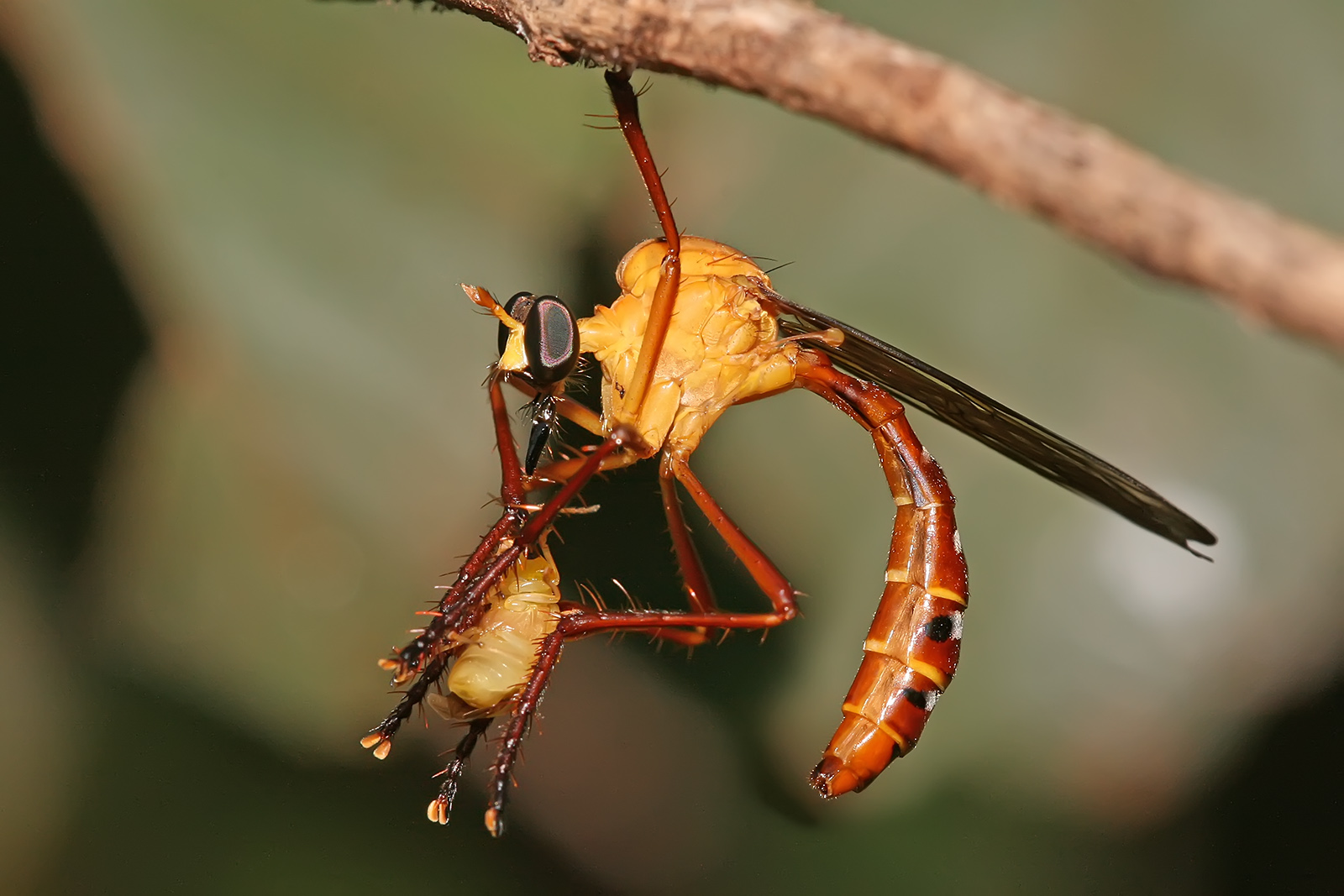
- Robber fly (Asilidae) with beetle prey

Scientific classification
- Kingdom: Animalia
- Phylum: Arthropoda
- Clade: Pancrustacea
- Class: Insecta
- Order: Diptera
- Infraorder: Asilomorpha
- Superfamily: Asiloidea

Families
- 10

= Asiloidea =

Superfamily of flies

The Asiloidea comprise a very large superfamily insects in the order Diptera, the true flies. It has a cosmopolitan distribution, occurring worldwide. It includes the family Bombyliidae, the bee flies, which are parasitoids, and the Asilidae, the robber flies, which are predators of other insects.

== Description ==
Adult Asiloidea are large and showy flies in terms of general appearance. They can be recognised by the following features: antenna with no more than 4 flagellomeres, leg empodium usually setiform or absent; wing with cell cup elongate and vein CuA2 ending freely on the wing margin or meeting with vein A1 at or near the wing margin. In families Mydidae, Apioceridae, and Asilidae, the head is at least slightly concave between the eyes and the ocelli, and both sexes are dichoptic (with a clear separation between the eyes). In Therevidae, Apsilocephalidae, and Scenopinidae, the males are usually holoptic (eyes meet at top of head).

Known larvae of this superfamily have posterior spiracles arising dorsally from the penultimate abdominal segment, making this feature a synapomorphy. However, larvae of most asiloids are unknown and this feature appears in other superfamilies as well. Another feature possessed by most asiloids (except Bombyliidae and Hilarimorphidae) is the larval cranium being modified into a hinged metacephalic rod.

== Ecology ==
Adults usually visit flowers to feed, while larvae usually live in a substrate and are predatory. There are exceptions to this rule, such as Bombyliidae (larvae are parasitoids of other insects) and Asilidae (adults are predatory). The greatest diversity of asiloids is in arid, sandy habitats.

== Distribution ==
The superfamily as a whole as a cosmopolitan distribution, as do some of its constituent families, such as Scenopinidae and Therevidae. Other families have more restricted distributions. For example, the only species of Evocoidae occurs in Chile.

== Phylogeny ==
The ancestral lifestyle for asiloid larvae is believed to be parasitoidism, with this being replaced by predation in all families except Bombyliidae.

It is not entirely clear that this superfamily is monophyletic. It is closely related to the Empidoidea and the Cyclorrhapha.

Within the superfamily, the "therevoid clade" (Apsilocephalidae, Evocoidae, Scenopinidae and Therevidae) forms a monophyletic group, with Evocoidae being the sister group to Apsilocephalidae and Therevidae sister to Scenopinidae. This clade diverged from other Asiloidea at the end of the Jurassic period (c. 150 million years ago), and its two pairs of families diverged from each other at the beginning of the Cretaceous (144 million years ago).

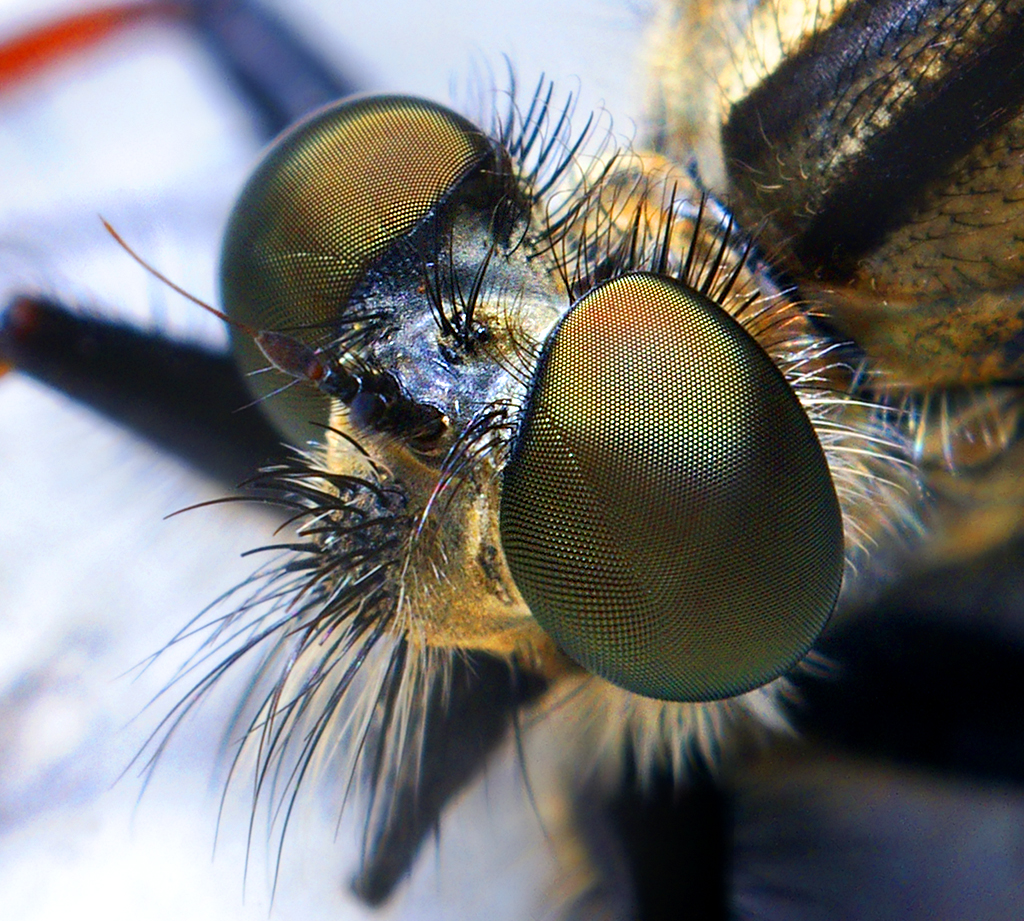
A robber fly illustrating typical Asiloidea head features

== Families ==
- Apioceridae – flower-loving flies
- Apsilocephalidae
- Apystomyiidae
- Asilidae – robber flies
- Bombyliidae – bee flies
- Evocoidae
- Hilarimorphidae
- Mydidae – mydas flies
- Mythicomyiidae
- Scenopinidae – window flies
- Therevidae – stiletto flies

The Protapioceridae, a family of extinct flies that were native to China, are also classified in the Asiloidea.
