= Paddle crab =

Paddle crab may refer to:

- Charybdis japonica, the Asian paddle crab
- Ovalipes catharus, the New Zealand paddle crab
