= Hacienda Napoles Airstrip =

Airstrip in Antioquia, Colombia

Hacienda Nápoles Airstrip
- IATA: none; ICAO: SQFQ

Summary
- Airport type: Private
- Serves: Hacienda Nápoles, Colombia
- Elevation AMSL: 764 ft / 233 m
- Coordinates: 05°55′20″N 74°43′42″W

Map

Runways
Direction	Length		Surface
Direction	m	ft	Surface
06/24	1,250	4,101	Asphalt
- Source: Vice.com

Hacienda Nápoles Airstrip is an airstrip on Hacienda Nápoles, a large estate in the Antioquia Department of Colombia.

Hacienda Nápoles is the former estate of drug lord Pablo Escobar, confiscated after his death and turned into a theme park. There is also a new maximum security prison on the estate.

== See also ==
- Transport in Colombia
- List of airports in Colombia
