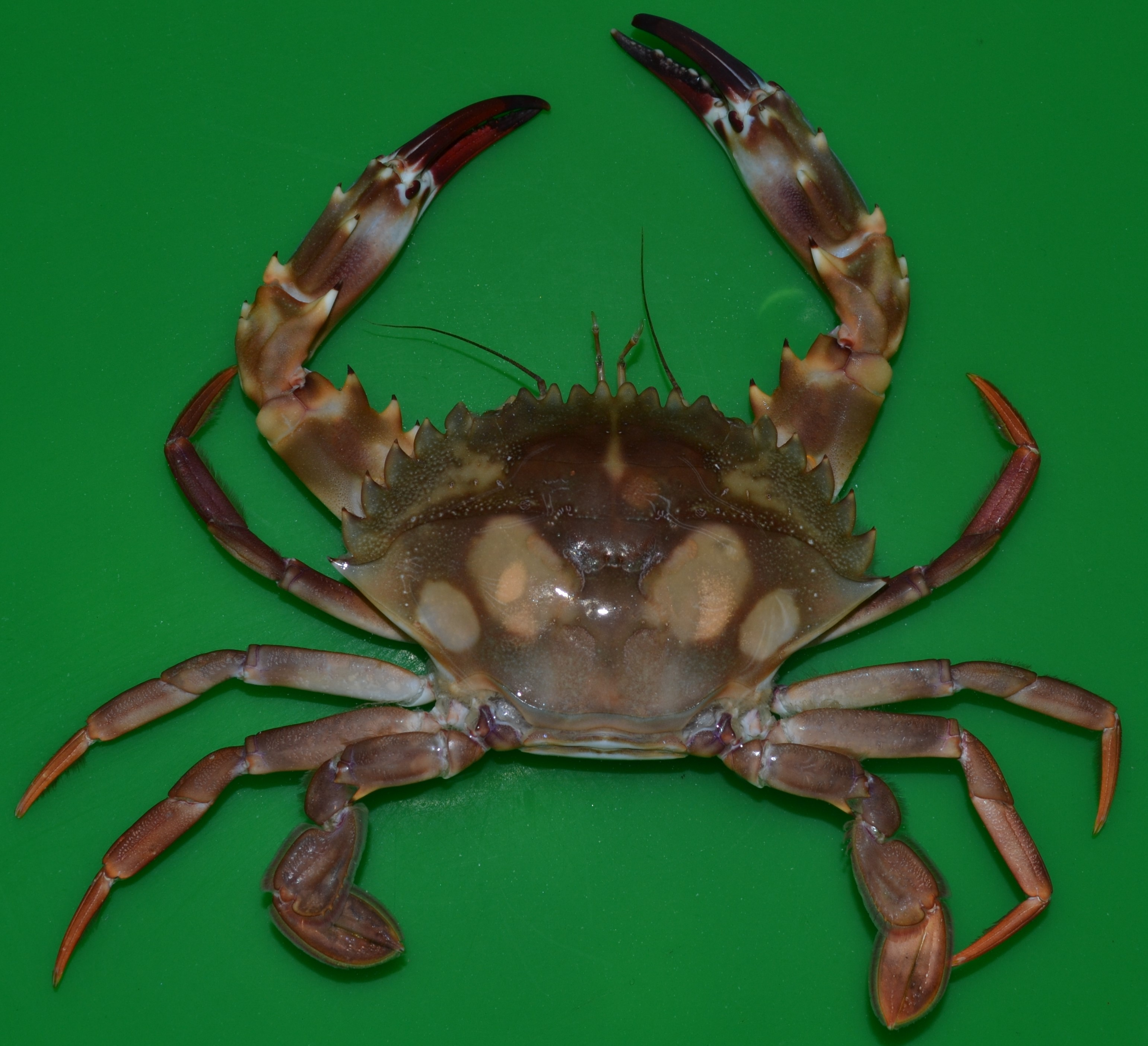
- In Sarawak

Scientific classification
- Domain: Eukaryota
- Kingdom: Animalia
- Phylum: Arthropoda
- Class: Malacostraca
- Order: Decapoda
- Suborder: Pleocyemata
- Infraorder: Brachyura
- Family: Portunidae
- Genus: Charybdis
- Species: C. lucifer

Binomial name
- Charybdis lucifer (Fabricius, 1798)

Synonyms
- Charybdis lucifera (Fabricius, 1798) [lapsus]; Goniosoma quadrimaculatum A. Milne-Edwards, 1861; Portunus lucifer Fabricius, 1798

= Charybdis lucifer =

Species of crab

Charybdis lucifer, also known as the yellowish-brown crab, is a species of swimming crab in the family Portunidae.

The type locality of this species is Indian Ocean, probably Tranquebar. It occurs naturally in the waters around Bangladesh, Malaysia India, Singapore, Pakistan, Sri Lanka, Indonesia, Taiwan, Thailand, Australia, Italy (Invasive species), Egypt (Invasive species), Mediterranean Sea (Invasive species).

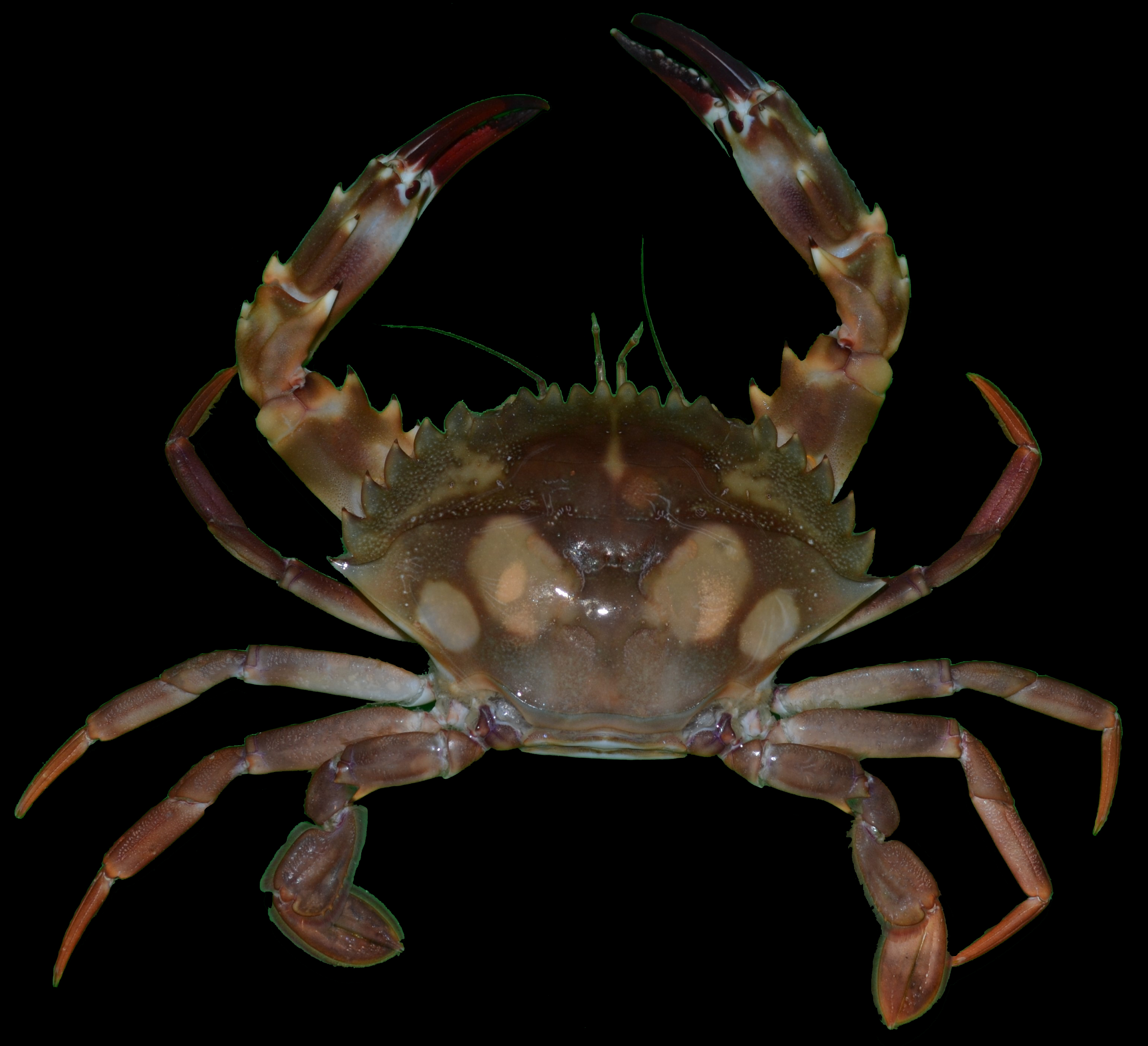
Dorsal view

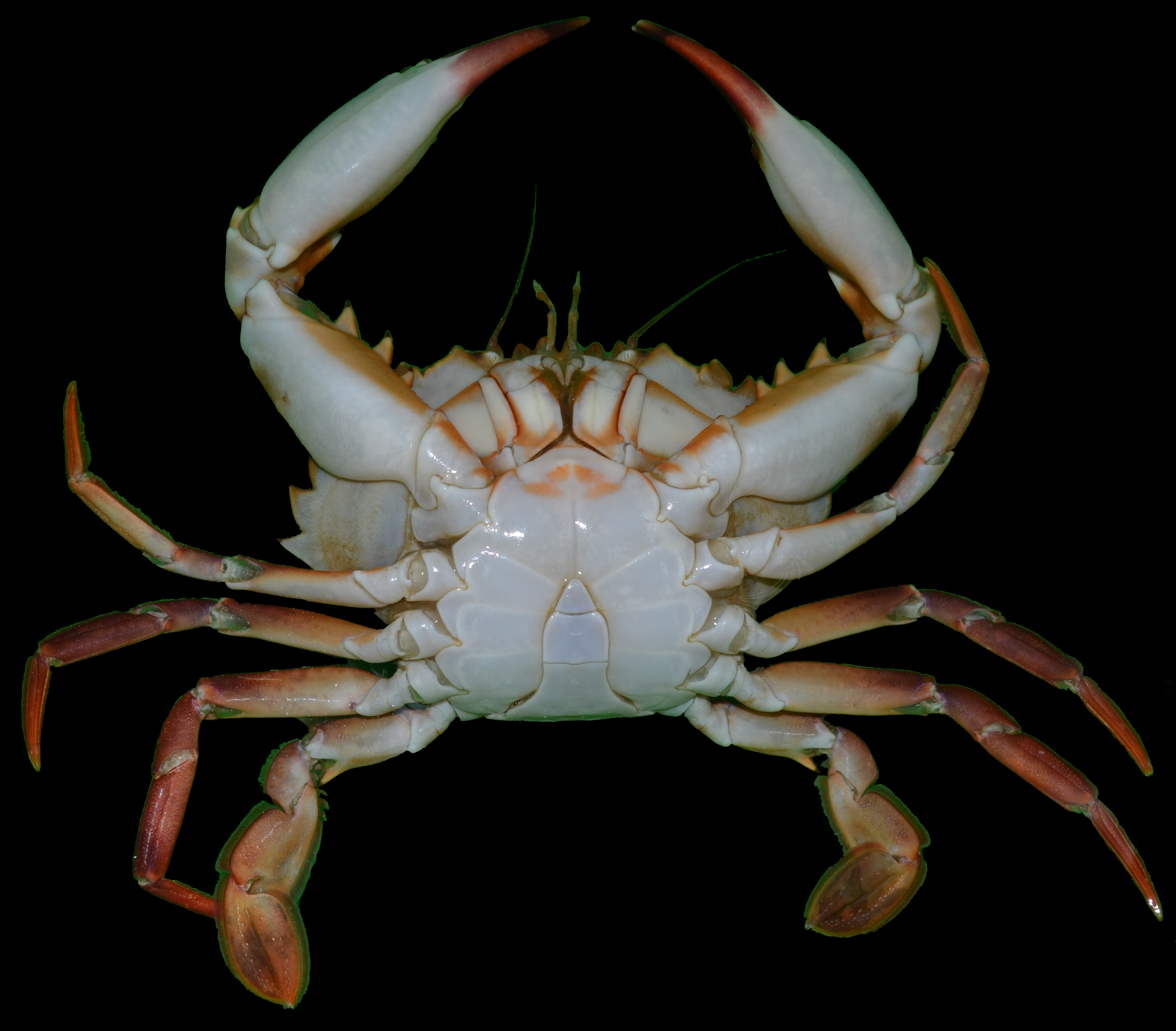
Ventral view
