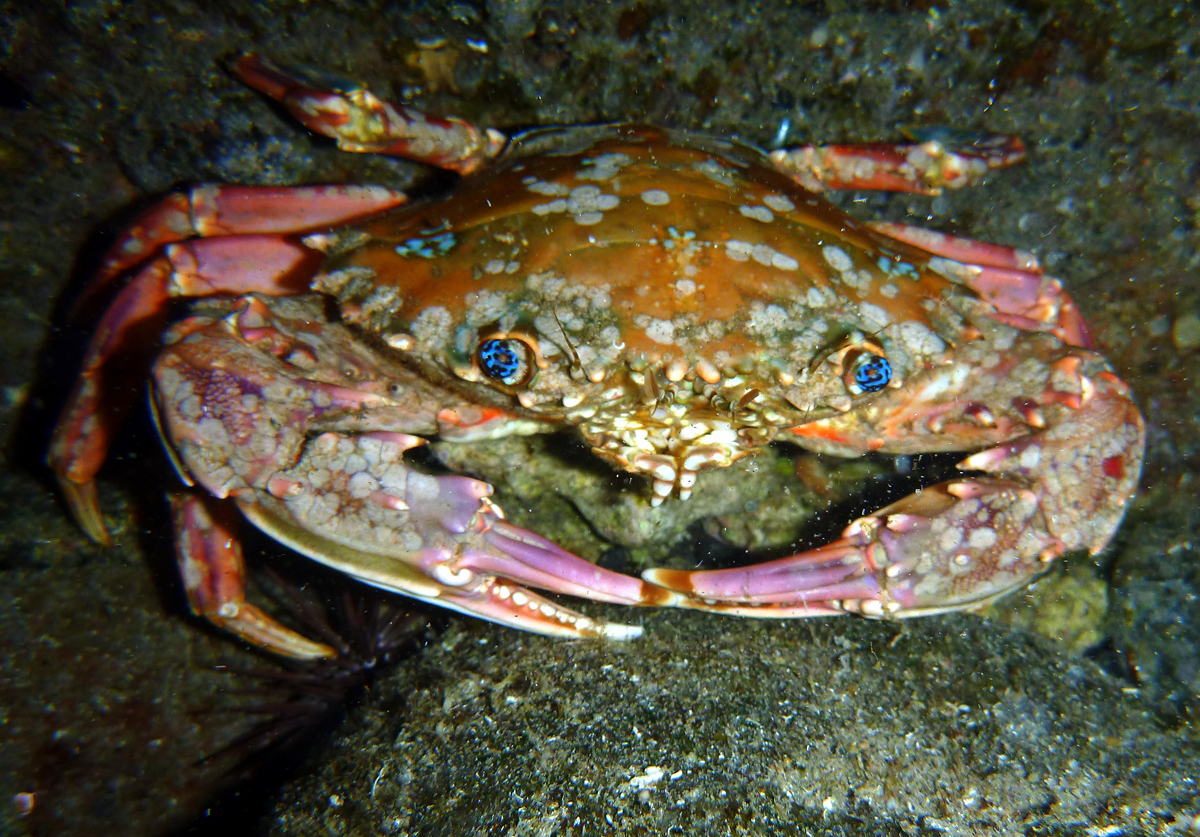

Scientific classification
- Kingdom: Animalia
- Phylum: Arthropoda
- Clade: Pancrustacea
- Class: Malacostraca
- Order: Decapoda
- Suborder: Pleocyemata
- Infraorder: Brachyura
- Family: Portunidae
- Genus: Charybdis
- Species: C. erythrodactyla

Binomial name
- Charybdis erythrodactyla Lamarck, 1818

= Charybdis erythrodactyla =

Species of crab

Charybdis erythrodactyla, also called the rainbow swimming crab, is a species of swimming crab in the family Portunidae. It lives in warm ocean waters as the Indian Ocean, the Red Sea, parts of the south pacific. They are occasionally found in the Honolulu fish market.

== Description ==
Charybdis erythrodactyla has a wide, flattened shell that helps it swim. It has bright blue markings on a yellow orange body. The carapace is slightly covered with fine hair and has six small teeth along the front edge. The sides of the shell also contain six teeth. These large individuals can grow to more than 7 inches (about 18 cm) across the carapace. The transverse ridges on the shell are strong, but there is no ridge across the cardiac region. The claws are more or less covered with fine hair, with small spines on the walking legs.

== Taxonomy ==
Charybdis erythrodactyla was first described by Lamarck in 1818. It belongs to the order Decapoda within the family Portunidae.

== Habitat and distribution ==
Charybdis erythrodactyla is a marine species found in the Pacific Ocean waters. It is typically found in shallow coastal areas, where it hides under rocks, ledges, or in reef environments during the day.

== Culture ==
The Rainbow crab Charybdis erythrodactyla has two Hawaiian names, Pāpaʻi, meaning crab, and Akoʻakoʻa, meaning coral.
