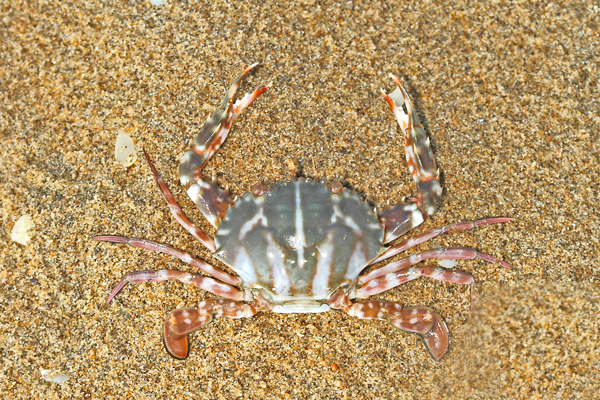

Scientific classification
- Kingdom: Animalia
- Phylum: Arthropoda
- Class: Malacostraca
- Order: Decapoda
- Suborder: Pleocyemata
- Infraorder: Brachyura
- Family: Portunidae
- Genus: Charybdis
- Species: C. feriata

Binomial name
- Charybdis feriata (Linnaeus, 1758)

Synonyms
- Cancer cruciata Herbst, 1794; Cancer crucifer Fabricius, 1792; Cancer feriata Linnaeus, 1758; Cancer sexdentatus Herbst, 1783; Charybdis cruciata (Herbst, 1794); Charybdis sexdentata (Herbst, 1783); Portunus crucifer Fabricius, 1798

= Charybdis feriata =

Species of crab

Charybdis feriata, the crucifix crab, is a species of swimming crab in the family Portunidae. It is found in the tropical and subtropical Indo-Pacific region.

== Description ==
This crab grows to a width of about 20 cm (8 in). The body is fan-shaped and the carapace is smooth, with some granular transverse lines. The front of the carapace bears six triangular teeth of similar size, and each side of the carapace bears six larger, truncated teeth which vary in size. The eyes are close together. There are three spines on the carpus of the cheliped (pincer leg), and smaller spines on the other joints. The hindmost pair of pleopods (walking legs) are paddle-shaped and are used in propulsion when swimming. The carapace is boldly patterned in cream and brown, and often bears a distinctive white cross on a dark background in the centre. The pincers are brown with white patches and the legs have brown and white bands.

This crab gets its common name from the cross-shaped mark on the carapace. Tradition has it that the Jesuit priest Francis Xavier lost his crucifix during a storm in Indonesia, possibly when he was trying to calm the waters. On the following day, while he was on the shore, a crab emerged from the sea holding his crucifix in its pincers. Saint Francis blessed the crab, and ever since, it has borne the mark of the cross on its shell. Some Catholics venerate the crab, and the shells are sometimes sold as religious trinkets or good luck charms.

== Distribution ==
Charybdis feriata is native to the tropical and subtropical western Indo-Pacific region. Its range extends from East Africa, the Red Sea and the Persian Gulf to Japan, Indonesia and Australia. It is uncommon in Australia but is harvested commercially in parts of its range such as India.

In February 2022, a female specimen was caught by some fishermen off the Genoese coast, in the area in front of the Lanterna, at a depth of about 50 meters using a lobster trammel net. Reported to the "DISTAV Fishing Biology Laboratory" of the University of Genoa, the specimen is transported to the Mediterranean department of the Genoa Aquarium, to be transferred to the curatorial tanks and to observe its behavior. This was not the first report of sighting or capture of this species of crab in the Mediterranean Sea, it had already been reported for the first time in 2004 in Spain, in the seas of Barcelona, the second in Livorno in 2015 and the third still in Spain, near Tarragona in 2017.

== Ecology ==
Charybdis feriata inhabits shallow water, on both rocks and sandy bottoms. Mating takes place between a hard-shelled male crab and a soft-shelled, freshly-moulted female crab. The male takes up a guarding "cradle" position before the female moults, straddling her and gripping her with his ambulatory legs. He dismounts while she is moulting, helping her to detach the old shell, before adopting the cradle position once more. Copulation is initiated a few hours later; the male turns the female over with his chelipeds and walking legs. She then positions herself underneath him, but facing in the opposite direction, with her abdomen extended and he inserts his gonopods into her genital openings. This position is maintained for about seven hours, during which time the male may walk around with the female attached. Afterwards the male adopts the cradle position again for a few hours, while she remains inactive until her shell has hardened. Spawning takes place about 17 days later, and as is the case with other crabs, the female carries the fertilised eggs under her abdomen.
