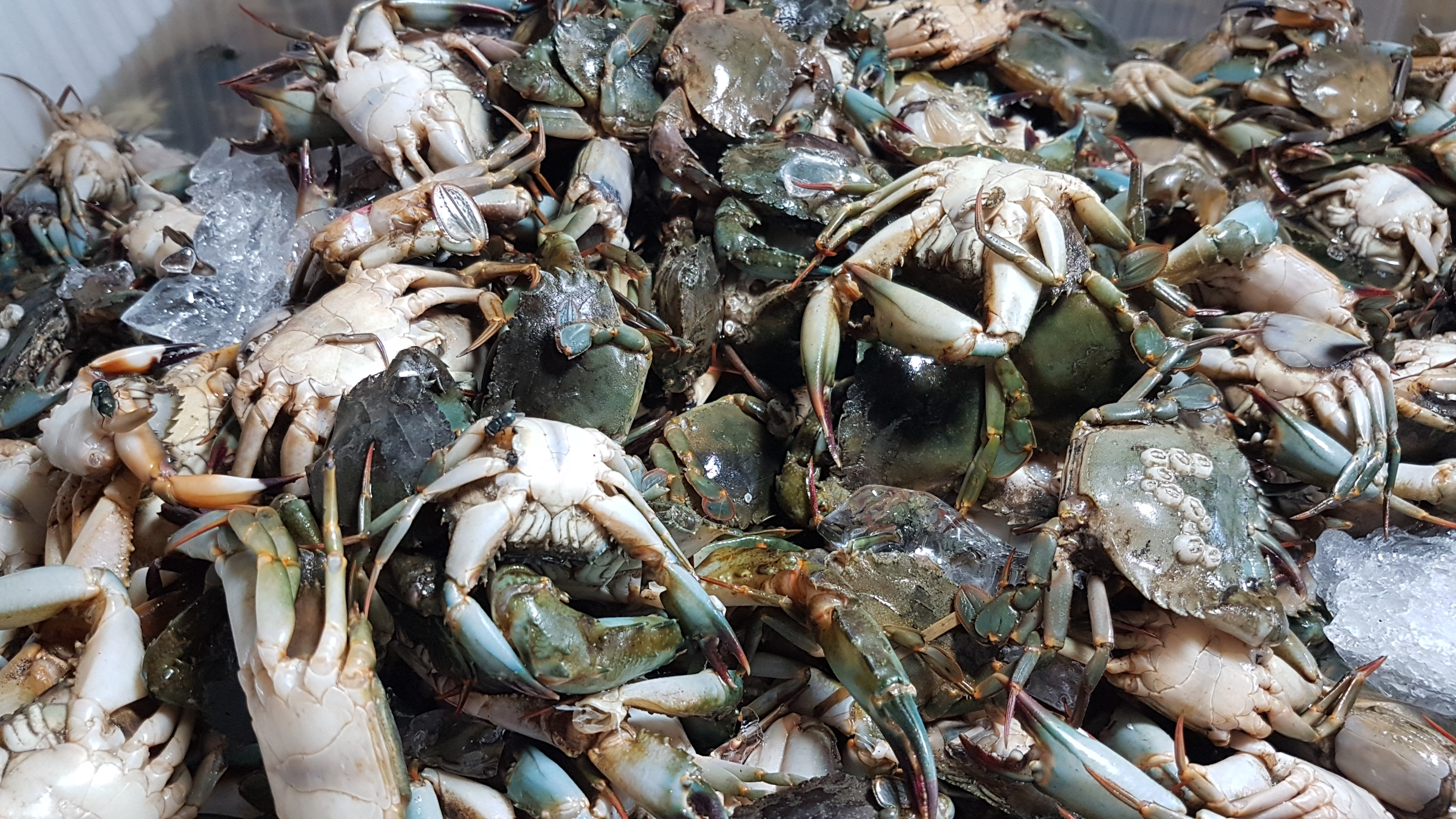
- C. natator in a fish market in the Philippines
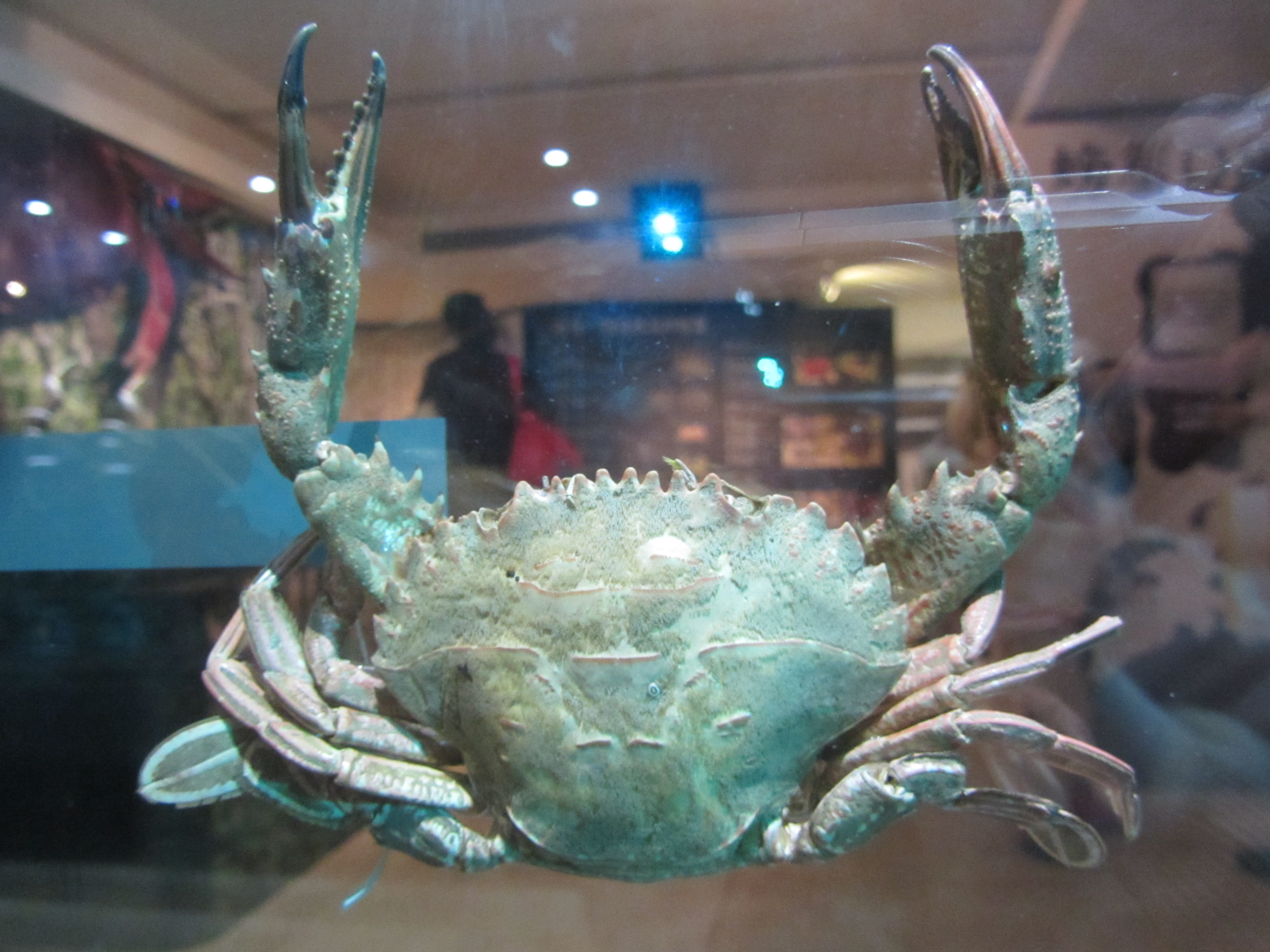
- Preserved specimen of C. natator

Scientific classification
- Domain: Eukaryota
- Kingdom: Animalia
- Phylum: Arthropoda
- Class: Malacostraca
- Order: Decapoda
- Suborder: Pleocyemata
- Infraorder: Brachyura
- Family: Portunidae
- Genus: Charybdis
- Species: C. natator

Binomial name
- Charybdis natator (Herbst, 1794)

Synonyms
- Cancer natator Herbst, 1794

= Charybdis natator =

Species of crab

Charybdis natator, the ridged swimming crab, wrinkled swimming crab or rock crab, is a widespread Indo-Pacific species of swimming crab from the genus Charybdis . It gets its name from the ridges on the dorsal surface of the carapace. It is a crab species which is of minor importance in fisheries.

== Description ==
Charybdis natator has a fan shaped carapace which is brown to orange in colour on the dorsal surface the ventral surface is bluish mottled with white and pale red spots and the legs are dark, reddish brown in colour. The carapace is densely covered with short pubescence which is absent on the distinct transverse granulated ridges in the anterior surface. There are six spines on each side of the carapace. There are eight small rounded lobes between the orbits which are set close together. The antennae are outside the orbits but are in contact with the supraorbital lobe at their base. The chelipeds are covered with large granules and/or squamiform markings and have distinct black tips with blue spots, this bright blue colour is also visible at the base of the cheliped. The anterior border of the merus of the cheliped has three spines with a single distal spine on its posterior border; the carpus has a robust spine on its inner angle and three spinules on its outer angle. The last pair of legs are flattened and can be rotated in a propeller like manner allowing the crab to swim in any direction. The maximum length is 17 cm.

== Distribution ==
Charybdis natator is found throughout the Indian and Pacific Oceans from eastern South Africa and Madagascar north to the Red Sea and across the Indian Ocean, including the Mascarene Islands and the Seychelles, to the western pacific where it extends north to Japan and south to northern Australia including Lord Howe Island.

== Biology ==
Charybdis natator is a benthic species found in the inter-tidal zone and in the sub -tidal zone down to a depth of 60m and over a variety of substrates, including sandy or silty bottoms, rocky and coral reefs and beds of weed. It prefers to hide under rocks or stones. It is uncommon throughout its range, normally making up less than 2% of the numbers of crabs sampled. In the Red Sea females with eggs have been found throughout the year, although there is a peak between May and September. The eggs hatch 11–15 days after being extruded and there is a period of 7 days between the larvae hatching and the extrusion of the next brood. Fecundity is 181,000 to 961,00 eggs for each spawning and each female can spawn three times per mature phase which means that this is a rather fecund species. In most populations spawning occurs twice a year. The larvae have six zoeae stages and a megalopa stage and from the first zoeae stage to megalopa takes 28–44 days.

== Human Use ==
Charybdis natator is an unimportant species for fisheries in eastern Africa and in India it is the fourth most important swimming crab caught in the crab fishery whereas in Taiwan and Australia it is much more important. Because of the high rate of meat recovery C. natator may be suitable for aquaculture.

== Etymology & taxonomy ==
The generic name, Charybdis, refers to a whirlpool in Greek while the specific name natator references its swimming ability. It was named as Cancer natator in 1794 by the German zoologist Johann Friedrich Wilhelm Herbst. There are two subspecies:

- Charybdis natator natator (Herbst 1794): the continental form
- Charybdis natator seychellensis Crosnier, 1984: the Seychelles
