= Hacienda Nápoles =

Estate belonging to Colombian drug lord Pablo Escobar

Coordinates: 5°54′52″N 74°43′18″W

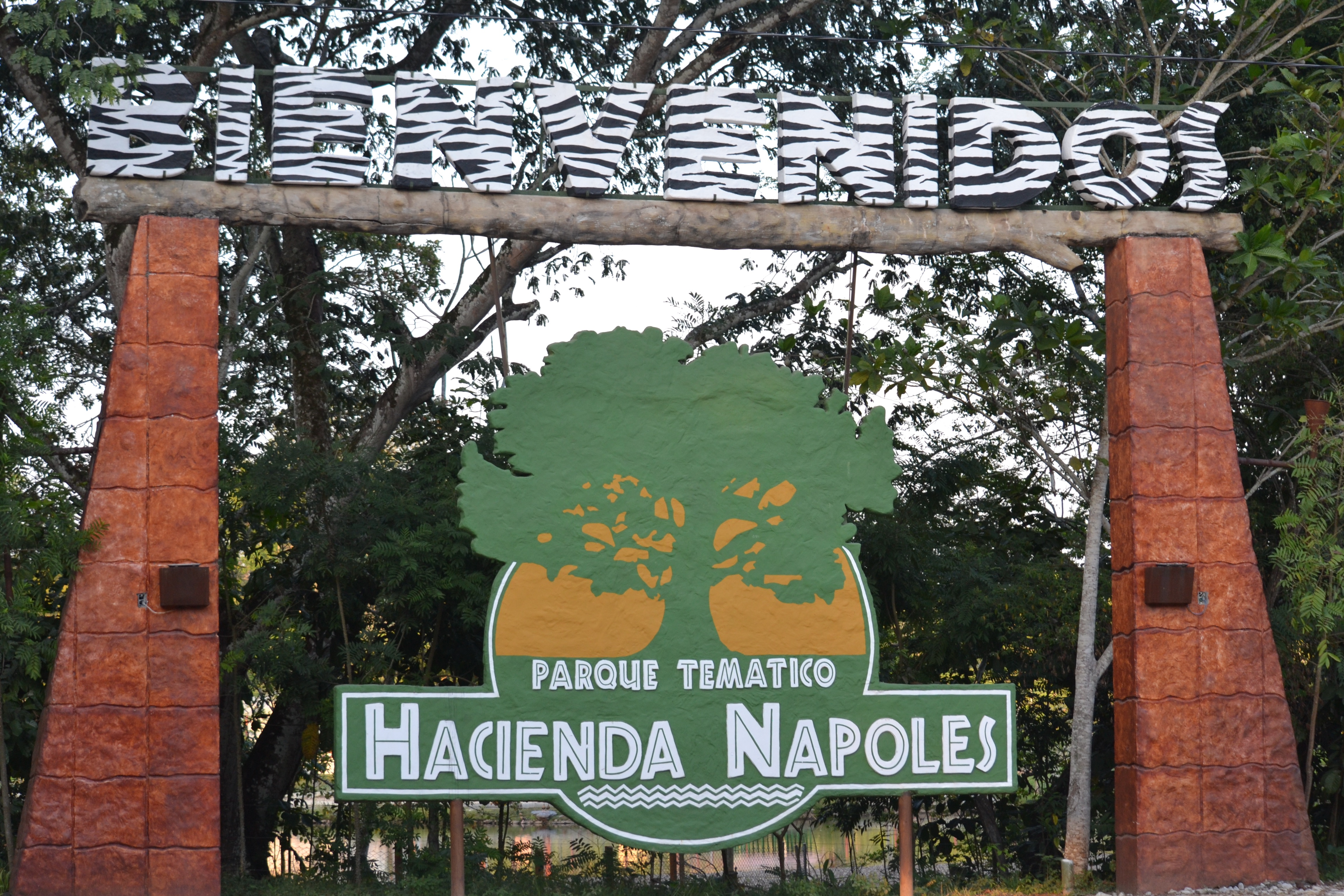
- Main entrance

General information
- Location: Puerto Triunfo, Antioquia, Colombia
- Year built: 1979

Technical details
- Size: 20 km^{2}

Website
- haciendanapoles.com

Hacienda Nápoles (lit. 'Naples Estate') is a zoo and a former estate built and owned by Colombian drug lord Pablo Escobar in Puerto Triunfo, Antioquia Department, Colombia, approximately 101 km (63 mi) east of Medellín and 156 km (97 mi) northwest of Bogotá by air. The zoo estate covers about 20 km^{2} (7.7 sq mi) of land adjacent to Highway 60 in Doradal near its intersection with Highway 45. Following Escobar's death in 1993, many of the original buildings were demolished or repurposed.

== History ==
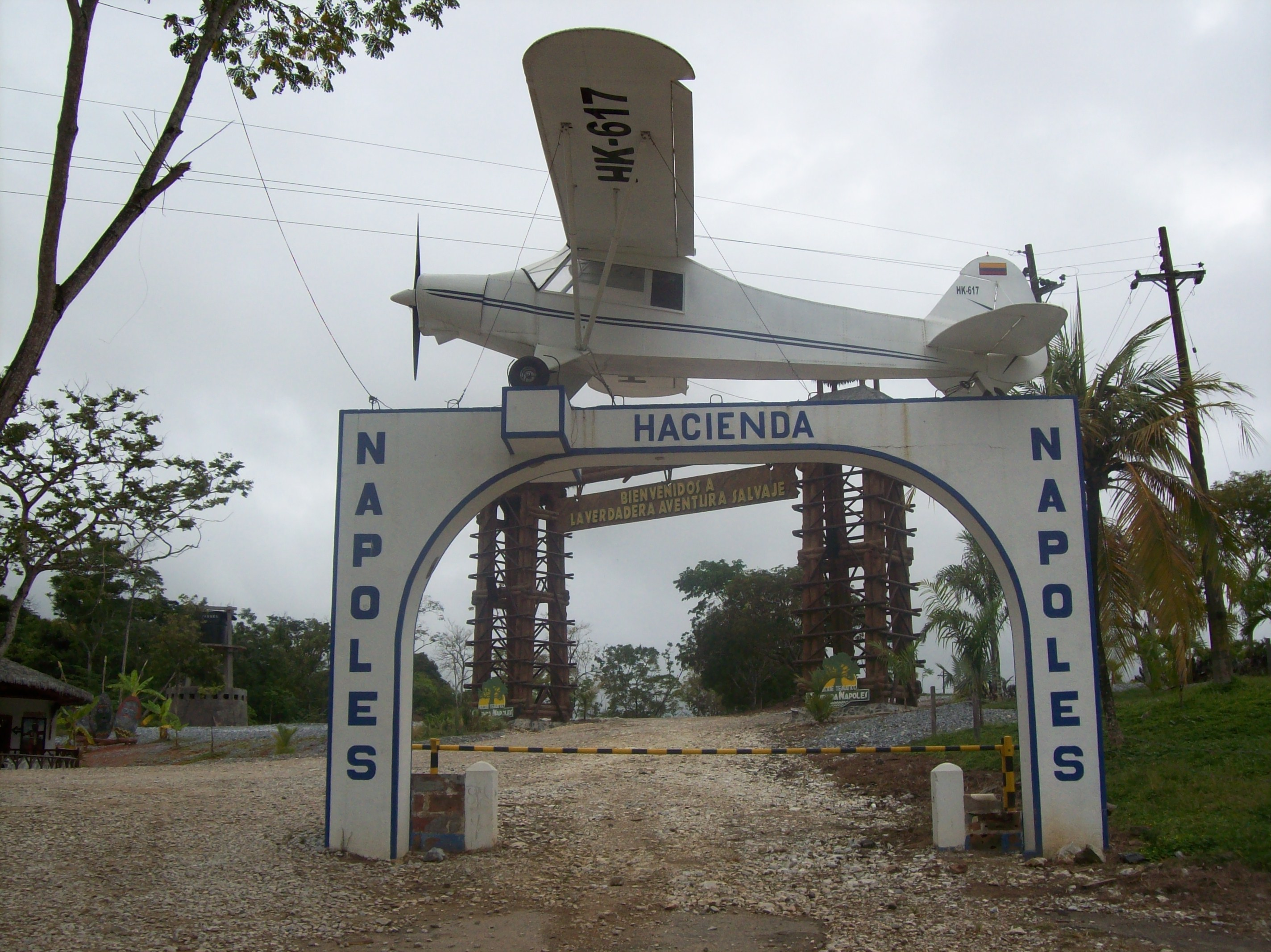
Main entrance

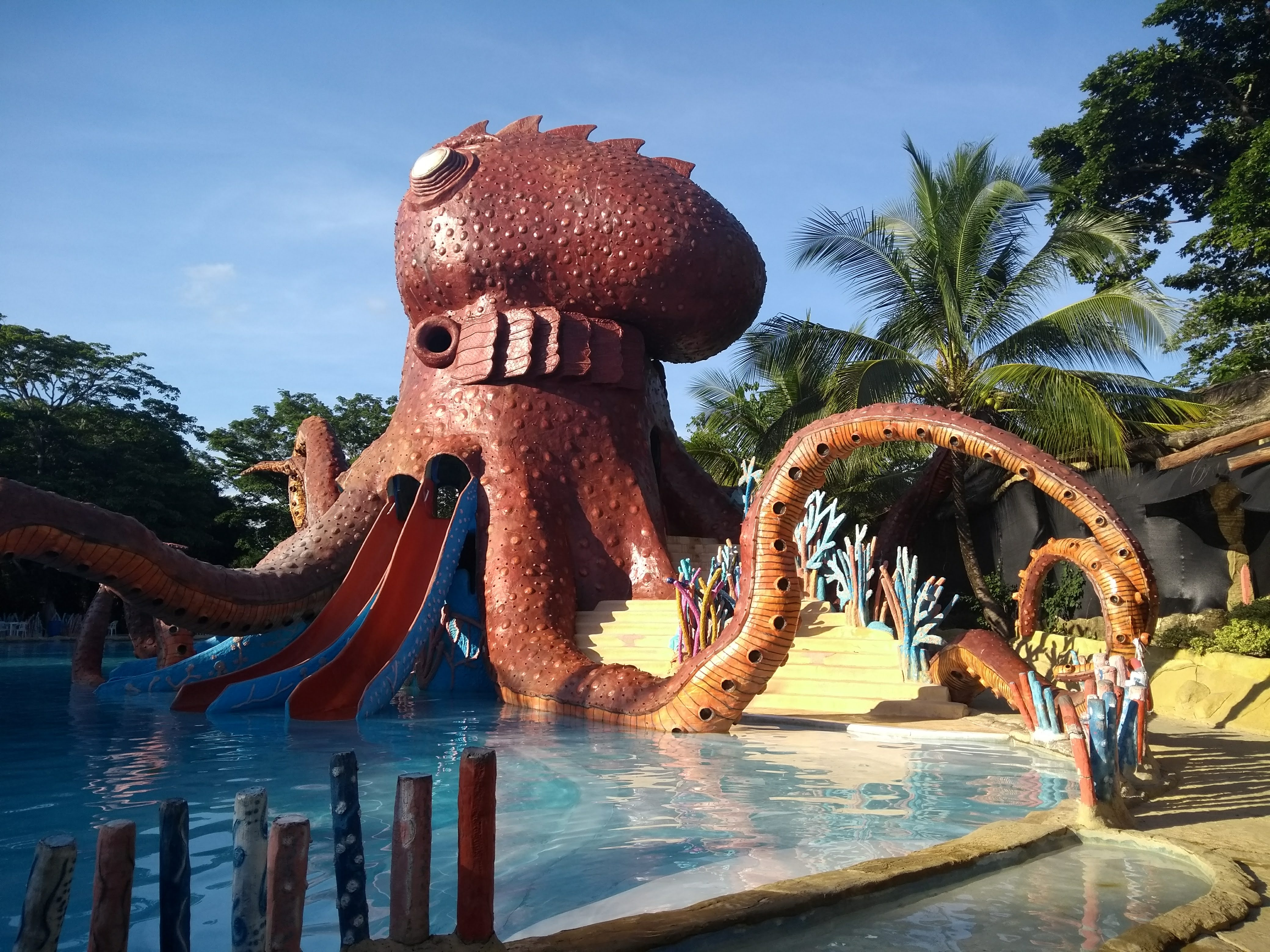
Popular waterslides at the amusement park

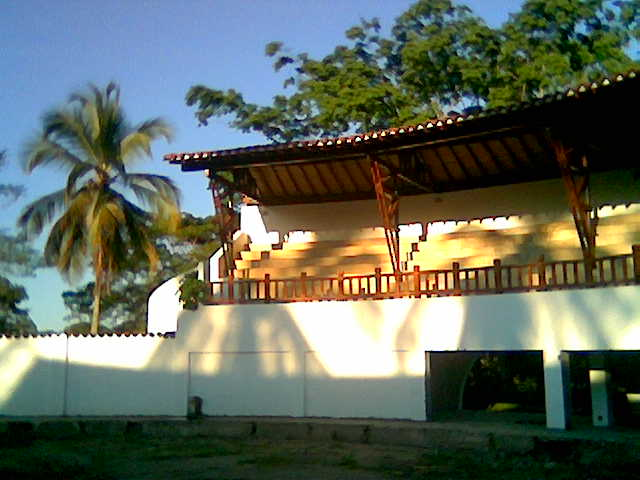
Hacienda Nápoles private bullring

The estate included a Spanish colonial house, a sculpture park, and a complete zoo that included many kinds of animals from different continents such as antelope, elephants, exotic birds, giraffes, hippopotamuses, ostriches, and ponies. The ranch also boasted a large collection of old and luxury cars and bikes, a private airport, a brothel, and even a Formula 1-racing track. Mounted atop the hacienda's entrance gate is a replica of the Piper PA-18 Super Cub airplane (tail number HK-617-P).

After Escobar was shot and killed by Colombian police in 1993, his family entered a legal struggle with the Colombian government over the property. The government prevailed, and the neglected property is now managed by the Municipality of Puerto Triunfo. The cost of maintenance for the zoo and the animals was too expensive for the government, so it was decided that most of the animals would be donated to various South American zoos.

Other original features include dinosaur statues as well as decommissioned military vehicles and a giant hand sculpture.

By November 2006, ownership of the property had passed to the Colombian government and was valued at 5 billion Colombian pesos (approximately $2.23 million). The hacienda's zoo as of February 2019 hosts bison, a rare goat, one ostrich, and zebras. Escobar's hippopotamuses have escaped and become feral, living in at least four lakes in the area and spreading into neighbouring rivers. Contact between the hippos and local fishermen led to calls for the hippo population to be culled. By 2011, there were at least 30 animals roaming wild in the countryside; the large number of hippos makes it difficult to find zoos into which they can be resettled. There are also reportedly 40 hippopotamuses living on the grounds of the hacienda itself; as of June 2014, the park's mascot, a live female hippo named Vanessa (who responds to her name), remains at the site.

In 2014, a "Jurassic Park"-style African theme park was operating on the grounds, which have been rented by a private company. "Parque Temático Hacienda Nápoles" comes complete with a water park, a guided safari attraction, aquariums, and a replica of the caves in Colombia's Cueva de los Guácharos National Park. In December 2018, a day ticket to the park cost 42,000 pesos (around $15). The Escobar museum, his burned private car collection, and the abandoned "ruins" of his house are still publicly accessible, but are reported to have collapsed in February 2015.

Escobar kept four hippos in a private menagerie at Hacienda Nápoles. They were deemed too difficult to seize and move after Escobar's death, and hence left on the untended estate. By 2007, the animals had multiplied to 16 and had taken to roaming the area for food in the nearby Magdalena River. The National Geographic Channel produced a documentary about them titled Cocaine Hippos. A report published in a Yale student magazine noted that local environmentalists are campaigning to protect the animals, although there is no clear plan for what will happen to them. In 2018, National Geographic published another article on the hippos which found disagreement among environmentalists on whether they were having a positive or negative impact, but that conservationists and locals — particularly those in the tourism industry — were mostly in support of their continued presence. In January 2021, scientists proposed to euthanize the now approximately 100 hippos, as they have dispersed over the Magdalena river basin. Some scientists have suggested castrating the male hippos to prevent further breeding. In February 2022, the Colombian government announced that hippos will be declared an invasive species. The hippo was officially added to the list of invasive alien species on 25 March 2022. On 3 November 2023, Environment Minister of Colombia, Susana Muhamad, said that, of the 166 hippos descended from Escobar's herd, 20 would be sterilised, others would be transferred abroad - and "some" would be euthanised. Colombian experts have long warned that the hippos' uncontrolled reproduction poses a threat to humans and native wildlife and estimates suggest that the population could reach 1,000 by 2035.
