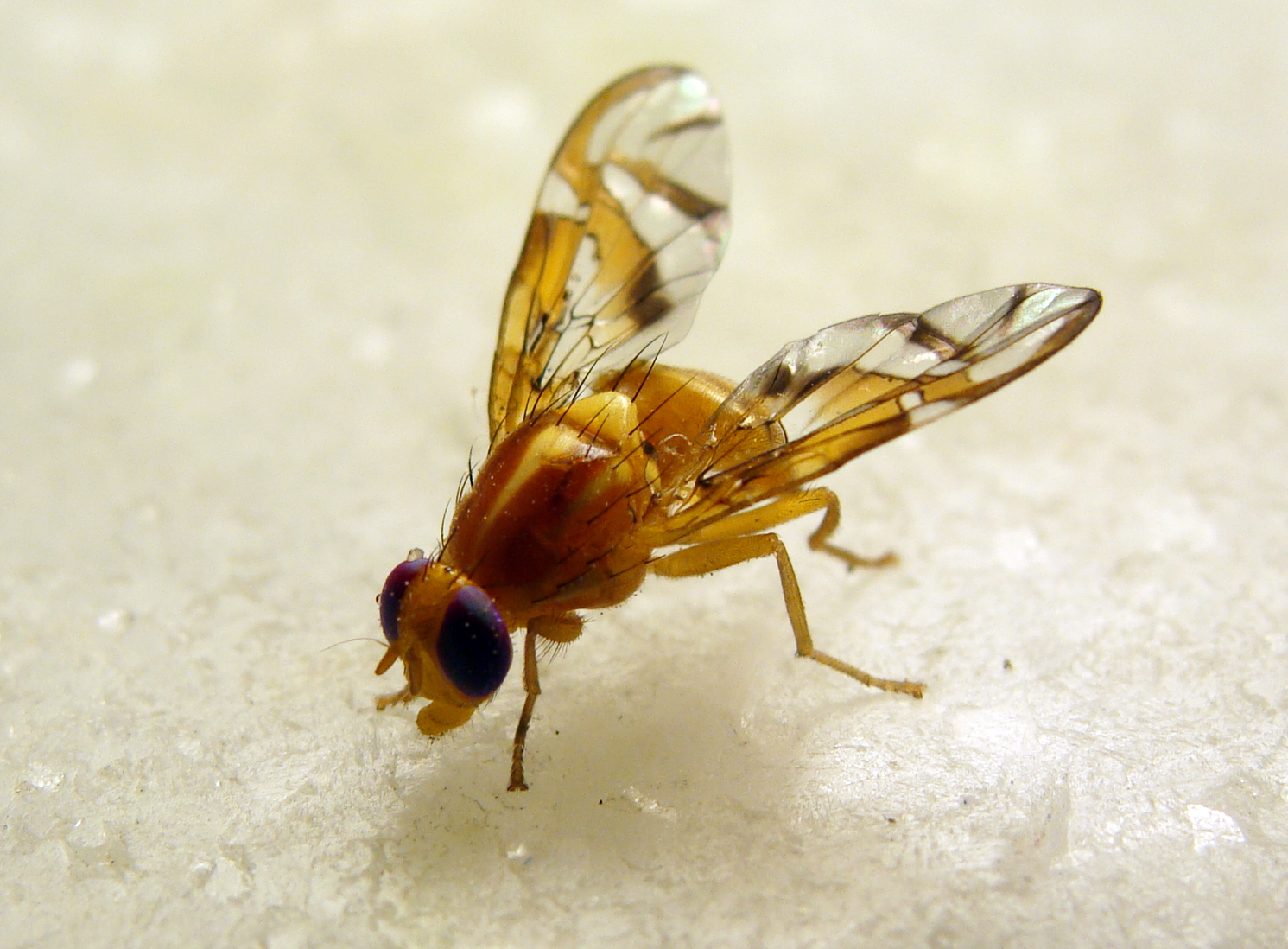

Scientific classification
- Kingdom: Animalia
- Phylum: Arthropoda
- Class: Insecta
- Order: Diptera
- Family: Tephritidae
- Genus: Anastrepha
- Species: A. fraterculus

Binomial name
- Anastrepha fraterculus Wiedemann, 1830

Synonyms
- Dacus fraterculus Wiedemann, 1830; Tephritis mellea Walker, 1837; Trypeta unicolor Loew, 1862; Anthomyia frutalis Weyenbergh, 1874; Anastrepha peruviana Townsend, 1913; Anastrepha braziliensis Greene, 1934; Anastrepha peruana Rosillo, 1953; Anastrepha costarukmanii Capoor, 1954; Anastrepha scholae Capoor, 1955; Anastrepha costaruckmanii Foote, 1967; Anastrepha lambayecae Korytkowski & Ojeda, 1968; Anastrepha fratelculus Dirlbek & Dirlbekova, 1973

= Anastrepha fraterculus =

South American fruit fly

Anastrepha fraterculus, known as the South American fruit fly, is a fruit fly species from the genus Anastrepha. A. fraterculus is a polyphagous, frugivorous fly that is a significant pest of commercial fruit production in South America.

== Taxonomy ==
German entomologist Christian Rudolph Wilhelm Wiedemann first described the South American fruit fly in 1830. The Anastrepha fraterculus species is not to be confused with the Anastrepha fraterculus complex, which is a cryptic species with eight taxonomically recognized morphotypes.

== Distribution ==
Anastrepha fraterculus is native to South America and is distributed throughout the southern United States (South Florida and southern Texas), Mexico, Central America, Caribbean Islands, and South America.

== Description ==
Anastrepha fraterculus is a small fruit fly. Its body colouration varies, from orange, to brown and yellow. They have six jointed legs attached to their thorax and one set of membranous wings with yellow and brown bands also attached at their thorax. Attached to their head is a pair of antennae. The antennae have three segments: the scape, the pedicel, and the flagellum. An arista is also located at the dorsal side and proximal end of the flagellum. They have six types of sensilla based on shape, located along their antennae. These sensilla are used for chemoreception. The female A. fraterculus have a modified ovipositor called an aculeus. The aculeus is near the cloacal opening, and it is conical in shape with serrations near the apex.

== Digestive system ==
The digestive system in the South American fruit fly is one long, continuous tube that connects the mouth to the anus. This tract is divided into three specialized regions: the foregut, the midgut, and the hindgut. The foregut is specialized to ingest and soften the food and begin digestion. The foregut contains a short gullet with an esophageal pouch, then a long, narrow crop duct that ends in a wide crop. The midgut is specialized for digestion and absorption of nutrients. The midgut contains a long, coiled stomach. The hindgut is specialized for absorbing nutrients and reabsorbing water and ions. The hindgut includes the ileum, the rectum, and associated rectal glands.

== Life cycle ==
Anastrepha fraterculus have a four-stage life cycle: egg, larva, pupa, and adult. The females lay their eggs in fruit, where the larvae develop until they reach adulthood and leave the fruit to mate. Their eggs are white, elongated, and curved. The chorion has extensions that are shorter near the anterior end of the egg and bluntly rounded at the posterior end of the egg. The larvae ingest the forced-out yolk masses near the anterior end of the egg and then emerge near the posterior end of the egg. The larvae molt three times before reaching maturity: the first instar occurs from 1-3 days old, the second instar from 4-6 days old, and the third instar from 7-12 days old. The larvae's third instar has some defining characteristics to help distinguish it from other species in the Anastrepha genus: the third instar is greater than 6.0 mm in length and 1.0 mm in diameter, their mandibles don't have a subapical tooth, they have 7-11 oral ridges, the abdominal segments lack dorsal spinules, and the anterior spiracle has 9-14 tubules. After the final molt, the larva enters the pupa stage. The pupa is an inert, sessile stage. The pupa is cylindrical and 4.5-60 mm in length and 2-2.5 mm in diameter. The pupae's colouration is yellow-tinged with brown and then turns reddish-yellow or dark brown. After pupating, the adult fly splits open the pupal case and exits, then leaves the fruit to continue the cycle.

=== Mating ===
The South American fruit flies mate through a lek mating system. The males aggregate into groups of 5, about 80 cm apart, usually on the underside of the leaves of host plants. They start their courtship and mating behaviour 1 hour after dawn until mid-morning. In these aggregations, the males release volatile pheromones to attract females. These pheromones are primarily released from glands in the rectum, though some pheromones are released from their salivary glands. The distal rectum is evaginated to increase the evaporative surface and increase pheromone emission. The females use an ovipositor to puncture the fruit's skin and lay their eggs inside. After laying their eggs, the female Anastrepha fraterculus drags their ovipositor along the fruit and releases an oviposition-deterring pheromone to prevent other females from laying their eggs in that fruit to improve the success of her offspring.

== Impacts ==
Anastrepha fraterculus is a major agricultural pest. They cause a lot of damage to the plants' fruits. The females puncture the fruit during oviposition, the larvae eat the fruit during maturation, and at adulthood, they damage the fruit by exiting. The punctures also facilitate the entry of phytopathogens into the fruit. A. fraterculus is also a mechanical vector for fungi spores that can cause the fruits to rot.

=== Host plants ===
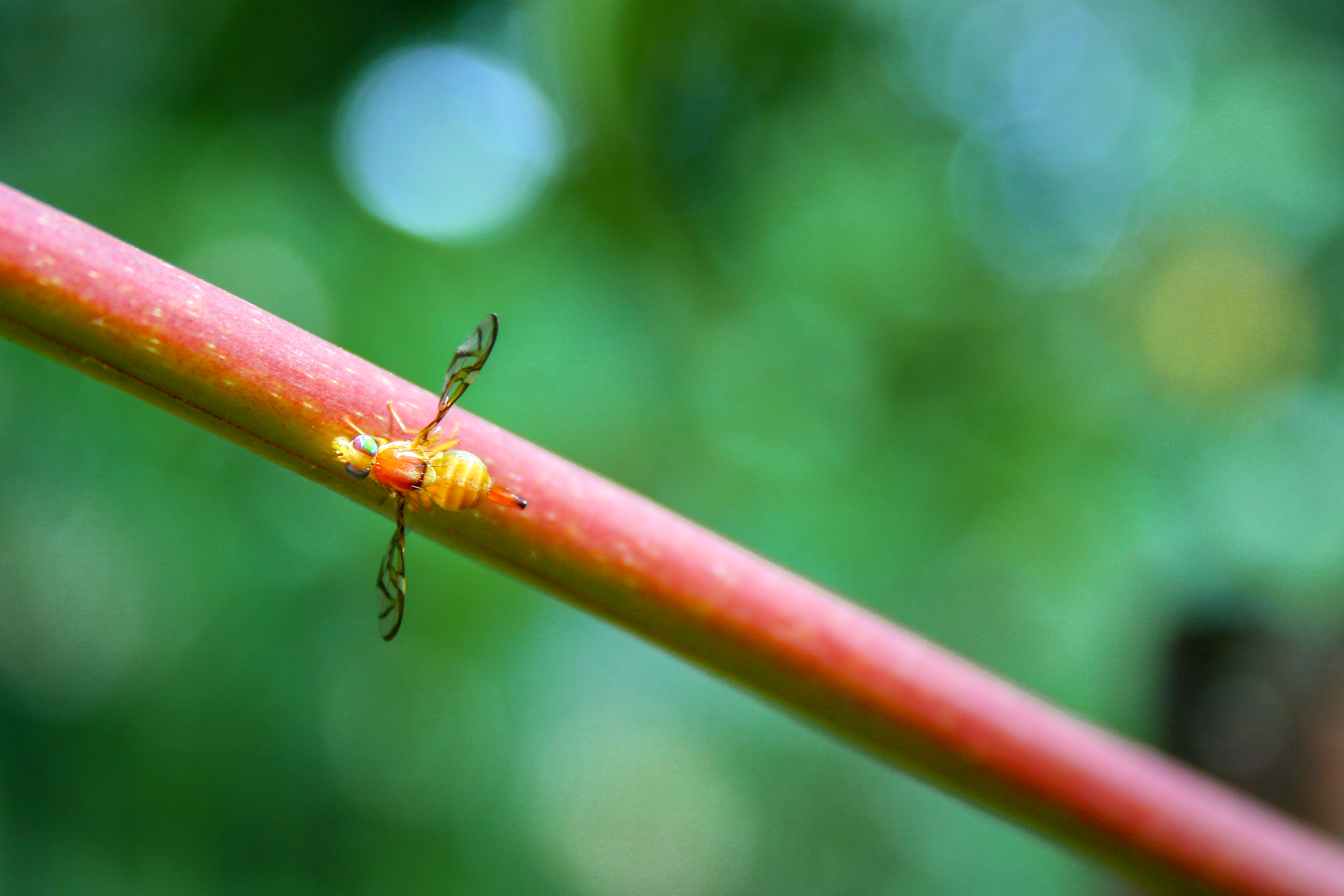
Anastrepha fraterculus on a stalk of vegetation.

Anastrepha fraterculus infect many host plants with their larvae. A. fraterculus infest at least 159 species of host plants, including many plants from the family Annonaceae, Myrtaceae, Rutaceae, Malpighiaceae, Rosaceae (apples, cherries, peaches, plums), Vitaceae (grapes), and many, many more.

=== Control techniques ===
Many control methods are being studied to decrease the amount of economic damage caused by Anastrepha fraterculus. These methods include using chemical products, such as biopesticides, which include plant extracts and oil, which are used in favour of harmful insecticides. Other alternative methods include sterile insect technique (SIT), where they induced sterility in mass-reared A. fraterculus, preferably males, through radiation, and then reintroduced them into the environment. Many improvements have been made to these mass-rearing protocols to identify males for SIT in viable, non-destructive manners. These methods include developing genetic sexing strains (GSS) and using hyperspectral images of the pupae to determine the sex. Another alternative method includes biological control techniques, such as the introduction of parasitoid species, like Diachasmimorpha longicaudata and Coptera haywardi, to infest and kill A. fraterculus.
