= Eremoneura =

Scientific classification
- Kingdom: Animalia
- Phylum: Arthropoda
- Class: Insecta
- Order: Diptera
- Infraorder: Muscomorpha
- Clade: Eremoneura; Lameere, 1906

Taxa
- Apystomyiidae; Cyclorrhapha; Empidoidea

Clade of flies

Eremoneura is a clade of flies within the Brachycera that includes the Empidoidea and the Cyclorrhapha and is a sister of the Asilomorpha. They are thought to have evolved around the Mesozoic. The group includes fossils described in the genus Chimeromyia from 125 million year old amber which show both empidoid and cyclorrhaphan characters. The monotypic family Apystomyiidae has also been placed within the Eremoneura as a sister of the Cyclorrhapha.
