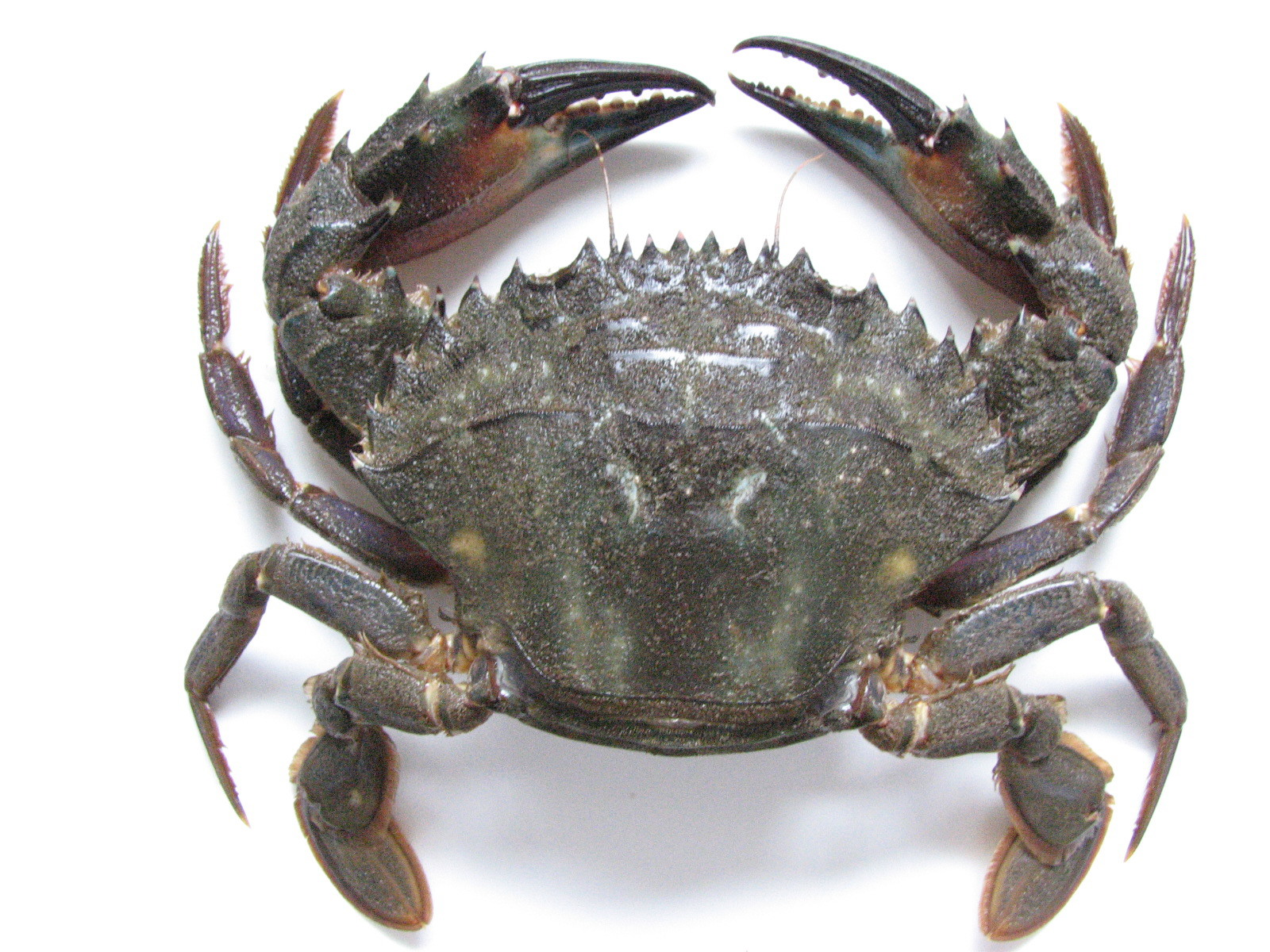

Scientific classification
- Kingdom: Animalia
- Phylum: Arthropoda
- Class: Malacostraca
- Order: Decapoda
- Suborder: Pleocyemata
- Infraorder: Brachyura
- Family: Portunidae
- Genus: Charybdis
- Species: C. japonica

Binomial name
- Charybdis japonica (A. Milne-Edwards, 1861)

Synonyms
- Goniosoma japonica A. Milne-Edwards, 1861; Charybdis sowerbyi Rathbun, 1931; Charybdis peitchihiliensis Shen, 1932

= Charybdis japonica =

Species of crab

Charybdis japonica, the Asian paddle crab, is a species of swimming crab in the family Portunidae. Charybdis japonica has a hexagonal, concave carapace around 12 centimetres (4.7 in) wide, the whole animal being pale green to olive green in colour.

It occurs naturally in the waters around Japan, Korea and Malaysia, but has become an invasive species in New Zealand. It has also been recorded as an alien species in the Adriatic Sea and off Australia.

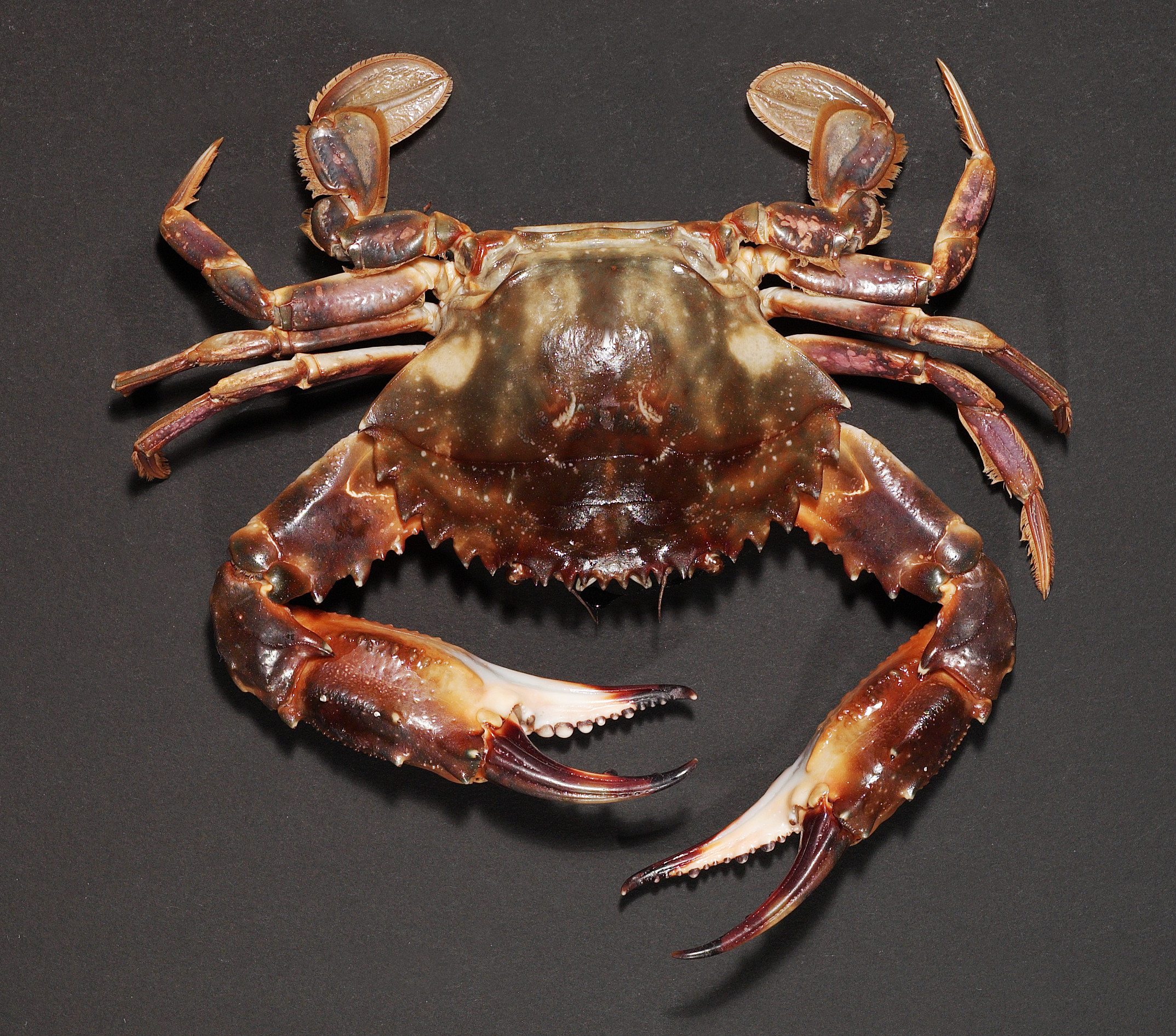
Dorsal view

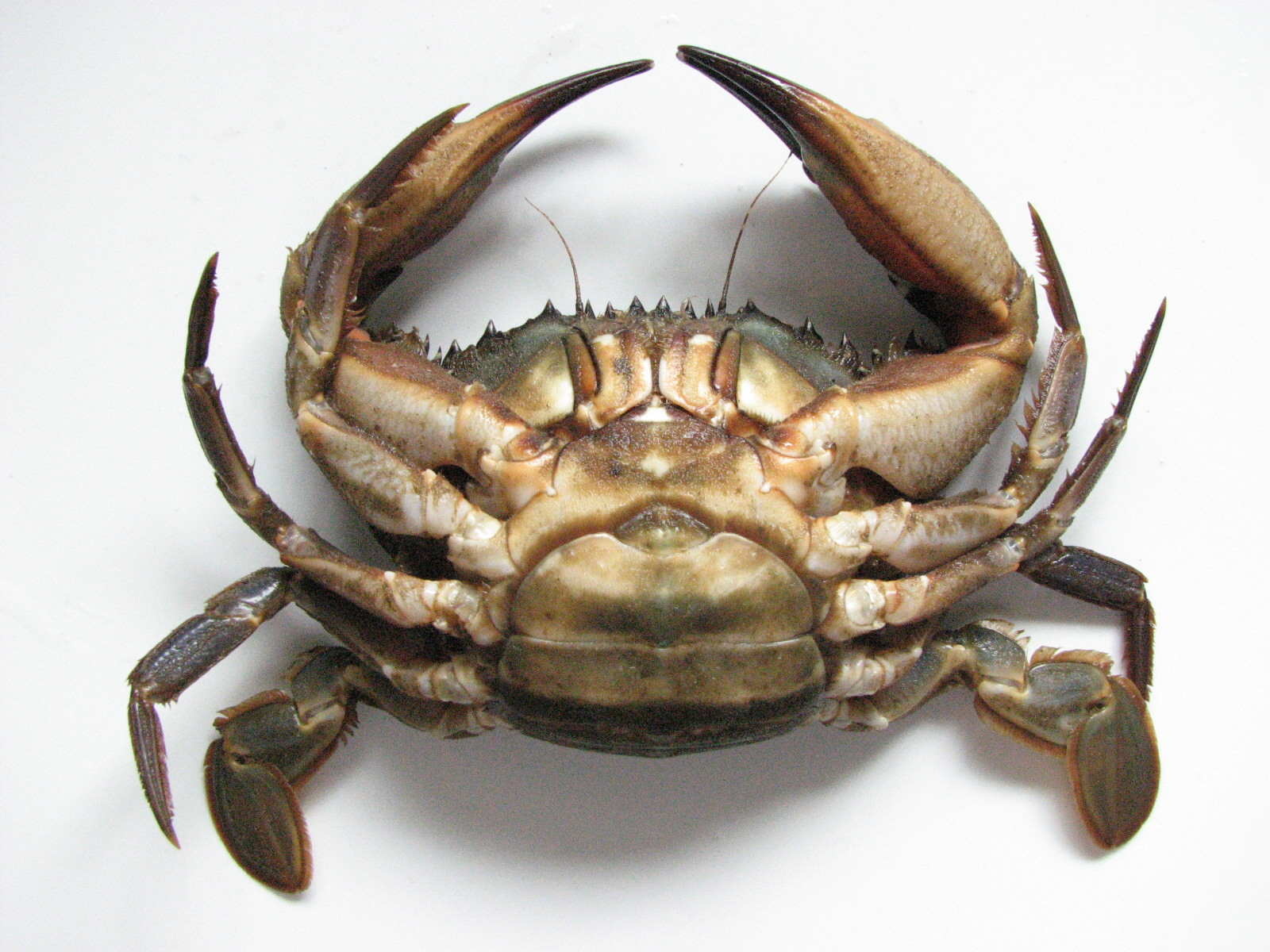
Ventral view
