= Puerto Triunfo =

- Municipality and town
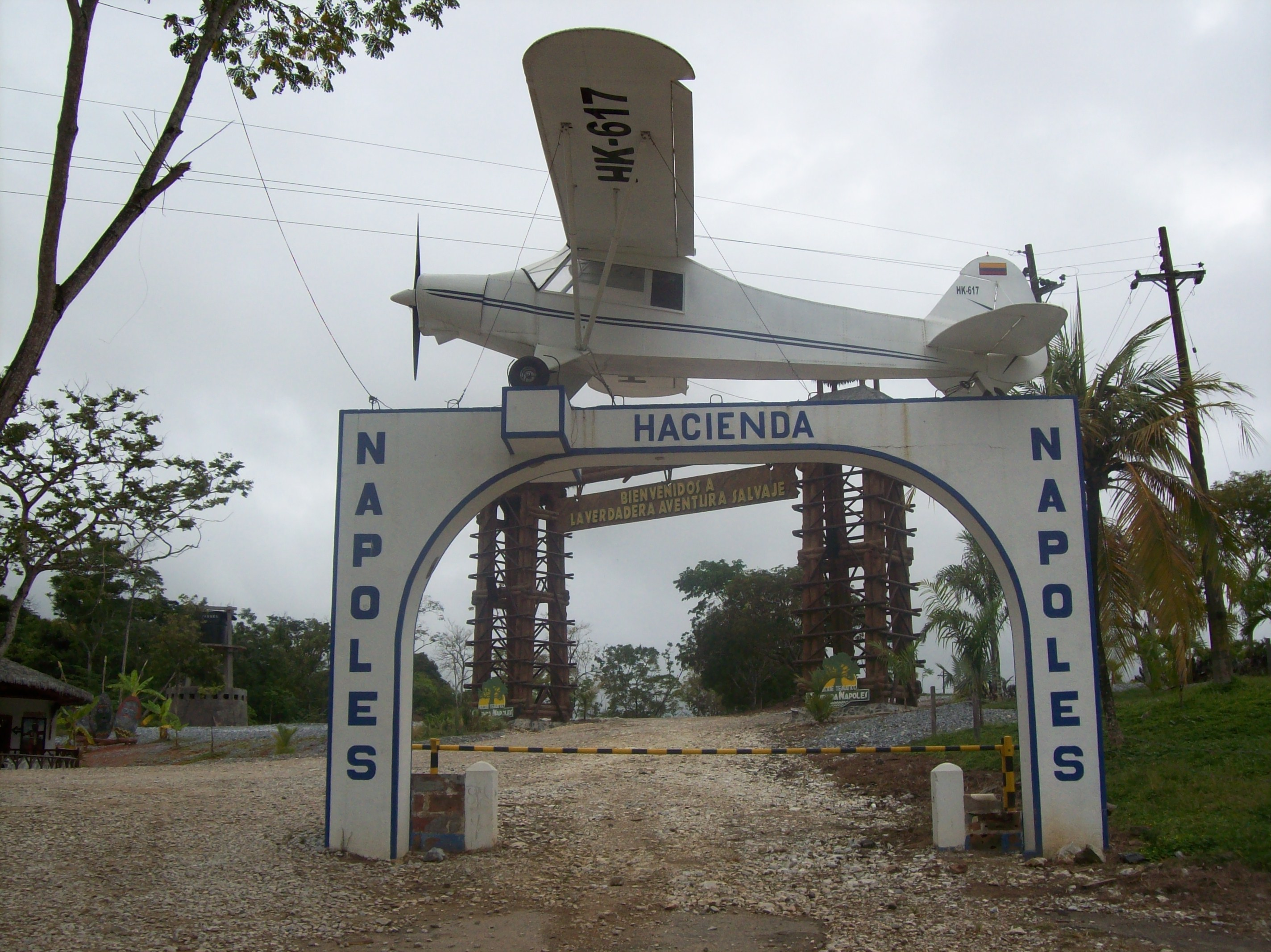

- Flag Coat of arms

- Location of the municipality and town of Puerto Triunfo in the Antioquia Department of Colombia
- Coordinates: 6°11′4″N 74°35′1″W
- Country: Colombia
- Department: Antioquia Department
- Subregion: Magdalena Medio

Population (Census 2018)
  - Total: 17,231
- Time zone: UTC-5 (Colombia Standard Time)

Puerto Triunfo is a town and municipality in Antioquia Department, Colombia. It is part of the Magdalena Medio Antioquia sub-region.

Near this town is located the Hacienda Napoles, which was once owned by Pablo Escobar.

== Natural wonders ==
- Claro river canyon
- La Danta caves
