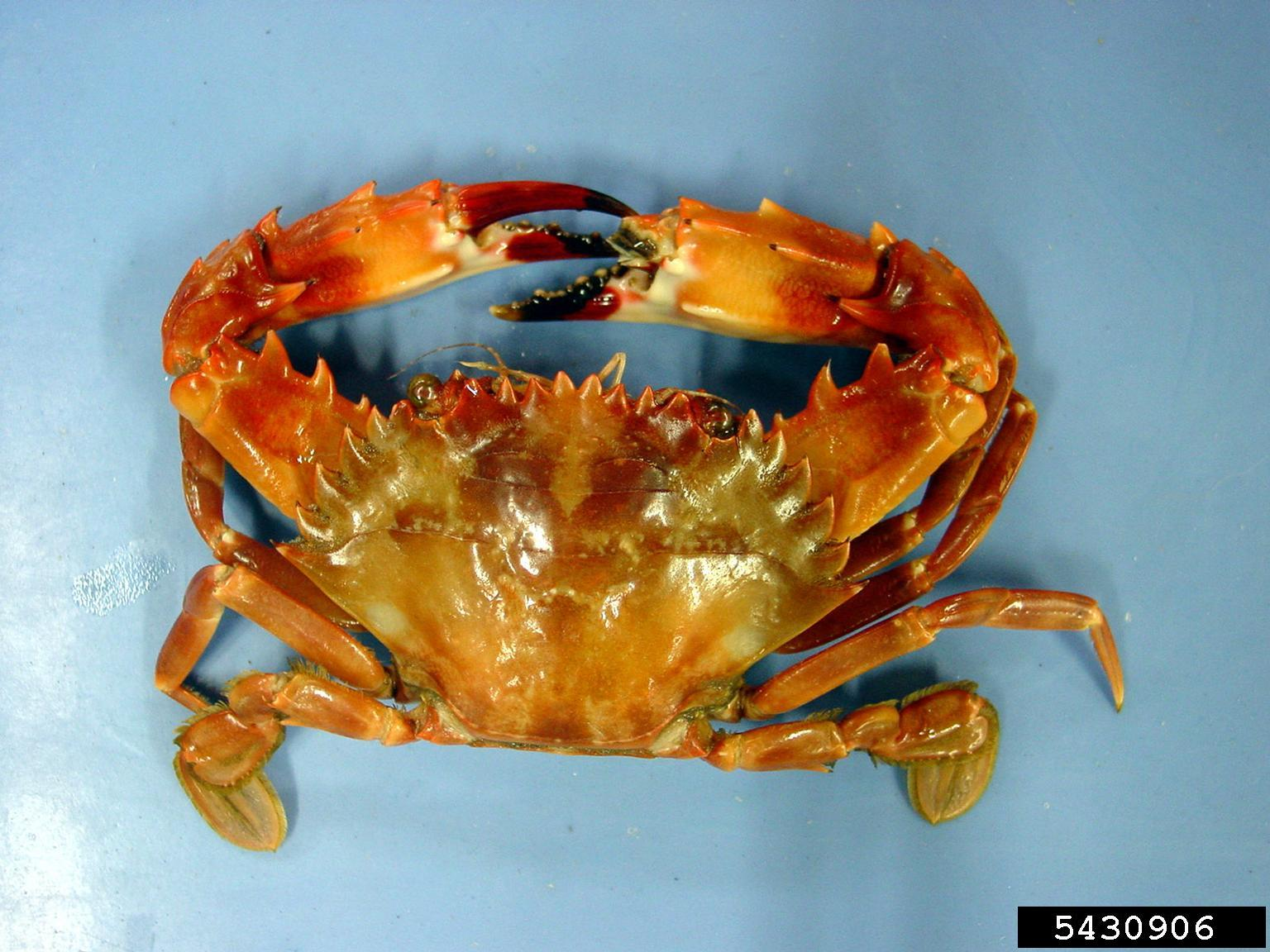

Scientific classification
- Kingdom: Animalia
- Phylum: Arthropoda
- Clade: Pancrustacea
- Class: Malacostraca
- Order: Decapoda
- Suborder: Pleocyemata
- Infraorder: Brachyura
- Family: Portunidae
- Genus: Charybdis
- Species: C. hellerii

Binomial name
- Charybdis hellerii (A. Milne-Edwards, 1867)

Synonyms
- Charybdis merguiensis de Man, 1887; Goniosoma hellerii A. Milne-Edwards, 1867

= Charybdis hellerii =

Species of crab

Charybdis hellerii, the Indo-Pacific swimming crab or spiny hands is a species of crab from the swimming crab family, the Portunidae. Its native range covers the Indian and Pacific Oceans but it has been introduced to the western Atlantic and has invaded the Mediterranean. It is a commercially exploited species in south-east Asia.

== Description ==
Charybdis hellerii has a hexagonal carapace which is convex and covered in long, soft hairs. There are grainy transverse ridges present on frontal, protogastric, mesogastric and branchial regions. There are six prominent frontal teeth: two sharp inner orbitals plus four blunt submedian teeth, the median teeth have an elliptical lower plane which projects beyond the submedian teeth, the lateral teeth are acutely triangular, separated from the submedian teeth by a deep V-shaped cleft. The inner supraorbital lobe is roughly triangular and the outer infraorbital lobe has a convex margin; there are six sharp teeth on the anterolateral margin which have black, brown or red tips and are separated by deep notches and of which the most anterior tooth is the smallest. The basal antennal article is swollen and excludes the antennal flagellum from the orbit. The claws are large, unequal and are covered in short, fine hairs with three spines on the anterior margin of the merus and a small spine at towards the tip. The carpus has a strong spine on the interior margin and three ridges on the external surface; chela has four spines on upper surface and a single spine close to the carpal joint, lower surface smooth. The merus and carpus of the fifth leg has a spine on posterior margin, the posterior margin of the propodus is toothed, the dactyl is oval in shape. In males the first pleopod is tapering and is curved towards the tip which bears spines. The carapace is a mottled brownish-grey in colour, the spines on the chelipeds have brown tips, while the fingers are distally black tipped with white.

== Distribution ==
=== Native ===
Charybdis hellerii has a native range which encompasses the Indo-Pacific region from the Red Sea and the east coast of Africa south to South Africa, east through the Indian Ocean and into the western Pacific north to Japan and south to eastern Australia. The type specimen was taken in New Caledonia.

=== Mediterranean ===
C. hellerii was first recorded in the Mediterranean off Palestine when specimens were collected in 1924 and 1925, it was subsequently recorded off Egypt in 1936 and by 2006 it had spread as far as Rhodes in the Dodecanese Islands. The most likely route of colonisation was by Lessepsian migration from the Gulf of Suez through the Suez Canal. The population in the Mediterranean decreases in density in the northern and western parts of its range suggesting that the spread of C. helleri may be restricted by water temperatures.

=== Western Atlantic ===
C. hellerii has been introduced to the tropical western Atlantic and the first records were from the Cuba in the 1980s and it has now spread to south eastern United States of America, throughout the West Indies, Colombia, Venezuela and Brazil. In the United States C. helleriis now abundant on the Atlantic coasts of Florida, South Carolina and North Carolina and although no live specimens been collected in Georgia the remains of this species were discovered in the intestines of a Kemp’s ridley sea turtle Lepidochelys kempii which was found dead on the beach of Wassaw Island, Georgia, which indicates that C. hellerii may have colonised the coasts of Georgia. This species was apparently widespread in the Caribbean before it was recorded by biologists. It probably reached the Caribbean by being transported by shipping, most likely from ports in the eastern Mediterranean. In 2004 there was a single record of an egg bearing female from Tampa Bay on the Gulf of Mexico coast of Florida.

=== Elsewhere ===
It was recorded in Pearl Harbor, Oahu in 1954 but this was a single individual and no further specimens have been found since in Hawaii It has also been recorded in New Zealand in the early 2000s when a specimen was recorded on a fishing vessel hauled out for maintenance on the South Island.

== Habitat ==
Charybdis hellerii occurs in a number of different habitats from the intertidal zone down to around 50 m in depth. It lives in areas with softer substrates like sand or mud flats so long as there are some stones. It also occurs in habitats with hard substrates where it can hide under rocks and among live corals, in tidal rock pools, among meadows of Thalassia and on mangrove roots (Rhizophora mangle). The juveniles have been observed co-existing in association with the bryozoan Schizoporella unicornis.

== Biology ==
Charybdis hellerii is a generalist carnivore which opportunistically exploits whatever food resources are available to it. It matures at a smaller size than related species, with a female reared in a laboratory recorded as being sexually mature at 12 months old and 77mm. They are fast breeders, producing over six broods of eggs throughout the year and the females are thought to be able to store sperm for as much as five months. Each brood can consist of 22,500 in small females to 3,200,000 eggs in the largest females. The free swimming larvae develop through six stages in 40 days, a longer development period than other Charybdis crabs, with a 4-day post larval stage, giving a total larval development period of 44 days. Its fecundity, sperm storage and long larval development time are factors which have probably facilitated the successful colonisation of new habitats by C. hellerii.

Large fish, such as groupers, octopus and sea turtles have been recorded as predators of C. hellerii. It has also been recorded as carrying the acorn barnacle (Chelonibia patula) on its carapace and chelipeds. 1.3% of specimens of C. hellerii sampled in Australian waters were infected with parasitic barnacles of the genus Sacculina.

== Human use ==
Charybdis hellerii has been cultivated in the Philippines and is commercially exploited by fisheries elsewhere in south-east Asia but where it is non native it does not have any market value and is not exploited.
