= Goniosupradens hawaiensis =

Scientific classification
- Kingdom: Animalia
- Phylum: Arthropoda
- Class: Malacostraca
- Order: Decapoda
- Suborder: Pleocyemata
- Infraorder: Brachyura
- Family: Portunidae
- Genus: Goniosupradens
- Species: G. hawaiensis

Binomial name
- Goniosupradens hawaiensis (Edmondson, 1954)

Species of swimming crabs

Goniosupradens hawaiensis, formerly known as Charybdis hawaiensis, is a species of swimming crab in the family Portunidae found in the tropical Pacific including Hawai'i.
