= Jentina E. Leene =

Dutch scientist

- Born: 5 September 1906; Amsterdam
- Died: 28 October 1994 (aged 88); Voorschoten
- Citizenship: Dutch
- Education: Amsterdam University
- Scientific career
- Fields: Zoology, Carcinology, Conservation and restoration of textiles
- Workplaces: Delft University of Technology
- Author abbrev. (zoology): Leene

Jentina E. Leene (5 September 1906 – 28 October 1994) was a Dutch scientist who had an early career in zoology, specifically carcinology, was a science teacher and then a textile scientist. Her zoological work was highly regarded, especially her doctoral thesis on the swimming crabs of the genus Charybdis.

== Early career ==
Leene was born in Amsterdam on 5 September 1906. She was educated in Amsterdam, going to Amsterdam University where she graduated in 1931 with a master's degree in zoology, specialising in comparative anatomy, studying the hearts of monitor lizards from the genus Varanus. She went on to study for a Ph.D. and she chose to study the taxonomy of crabs, probably under the influence of her teacher Professor J.E.W. Ihle who was working on the specimens collected by the Siboga expedition of 1899-1900. He allocated the swimming crabs, Portunidae, to Leene who attempted to write a monograph of the family and visited a number of museums in the Netherlands and abroad in the course of this work. Her thesis was published in 1930, proving to be a thorough treatment of the swimming crabs of the genus Charybdis and some other smaller genera of the family Portunidae, she hoped to complete a monograph of the family over subsequent years. Leene was awarded her doctoral degree cum laude on 22 June 1938 and her thesis is still considered as an important work for workers on the Portunidae.

== Teaching ==
The economic situation in the 1930s meant that Leene could not continue her zoology career and to make ends meet she became a high school biology teacher, teaching at a number of schools in different towns in order to gate an income she could survive on. This left little time for her to continue her studies in carcinology. On 15 October 1939 she was appointed as a teacher of biology at a girls' school for technical education in Arnhem, while having another job teaching in Haarlem. When a teacher specialising in textile fibre research left Leene was asked to take that subject on too. She became interested and proficient in this subject ad in 1945 she was appointed as a curator in the Division of Fibre Technology in the Department of Mechanical Technology of Technische Hogeschool Delft (Delft Institute of Technology).

== Resumption of science career ==
Her teaching work between 1938 and 1945 had left her little time for scientific research but she renewed her career, this time in the field of fibre technology. Leene was appointed a lecturer in fibre technology as Delft University and was later appointed a full professor, eventually retiring in 1971.

Leene published a carcinological paper in 1949 in collaboration with Miss A.M. Buitendijk in which she described 3 new species. This was in a special edition of Bijdragen tot de Dierkunde to celebrate the 70th birthdays of Professor Ihle and another of her teachers, Professor L.F. de Beaufort who had been director of the Zoological Museum of Amsterdam. The paper was severely edited but the renowned carcinologist Lipke Holthuis found the full manuscript among Miss Buitendijk's papers following her death in 1950. With Leene's help he published the remainder of the paper in 1952.

== Retirement ==
Leene retired from her position at the Delft University of Technology in 1971 and she retired to the town of Voorschoten where she lived in an apartment in a retirement home with a friend until her death in 1996 at the age of 88.

== Publications ==
=== Zoology ===
In her carcinological career Leene published the following:

- 1930 J. E. Leene & A. G. Vorstman, Note on the structure of the heart of Varanus as compared with other reptilian hearts. Tijdschrift Nederlandsche Dierkundige Vereeniging 3 (2) 62-66
- 1936 Note on Charybdis erythrodactyla, Charybdis acutifrons and Charybdis obtusifrons nov. spec. Zoologische Mededelingen Leiden 19 117-127
- 1937 Notes on Charybdis demani nov. spec, Charybdis variegata var. brevispinosa nov. var. and other Charybdis species. Zoologische Mededelingen 19 165-176;
- 1938 The Decapoda Brachyura of the Siboga-Expedition. VII. Brachygnatha: Portunidae. Siboga Expeditie Monografie, 39 (c3) 1-156
- 1940 Biological Results of the Snellius Expedition. VI. The Portunidae of the Snellius Expedition (Part I). Temminckia 5: 163-188
- 1949 Jentina E. Leene & Alida M. Buitendijk Note on Charybdis ihlei nov. spec., Charybdis beauforti nov. spec., and Charybdis edwardsi nom. nov., from the collection of the British Museum (Natural History), London. Bijdragen tot de Dierkunde 28 : 291-298.
- 1950 In Memoriam A.M. Buitendijk, Mededelingen van de Nederlandsche Vereniging van Vrouwen met Academische Opleiding 16 (4) 1.
- 1952 Jentina E. Leene & Alida M. Buitendijk On some Portunid crabs from the Indo-west pacific region Zoologische Mededelingen Leiden 31 (19)213-223

=== Conservation and restoration of textiles ===
- Sieders, R., J. W. H. Uytenbogaart, and J. E. Leene, "The restoration and preservation of old fabrics", Studies in conservation, vol. 2, no. 4, pp. 161–169, 1956
- Textile Conservation. Jentina E. Leene, ed. New York: Smithsonian Institution. 1972.
