= Hilarimorphidae =

Scientific classification
- Kingdom: Animalia
- Phylum: Arthropoda
- Clade: Pancrustacea
- Class: Insecta
- Order: Diptera
- Suborder: Brachycera
- Family: Hilarimorphidae; Williston, 1896

Family of flies

The Hilarimorphidae or hilarimorphid flies are a family of Diptera. They are of uncertain placement and may be related to the Acroceridae. Most species are Nearctic.

== Species ==
Genus †Cretahilarimorpha Myskowiak, Azar & Nel, 2016

- †Cretahilarimorpha lebanensis Myskowiak, Azar & Nel, 2016

Genus Hilarimorpha Schiner, 1860

- Hilarimorpha abuta Webb, 1974
- Hilarimorpha bumulla Webb, 1974
- Hilarimorpha californica Webb, 1974
- Hilarimorpha clavata Webb, 1974
- Hilarimorpha cunata Webb, 1974
- Hilarimorpha desta Webb, 1974
- Hilarimorpha ditissa Webb, 1975
- Hilarimorpha kena Webb, 1974
- Hilarimorpha lamara Webb, 1974
- Hilarimorpha lantha Webb, 1974
- Hilarimorpha loisae Webb, 1974
- Hilarimorpha mandana Webb, 1974
- Hilarimorpha mentata Webb, 1974
- Hilarimorpha mikii Williston, 1888
- Hilarimorpha modesta Webb, 1974
- Hilarimorpha obscura Bigot, 1887
- Hilarimorpha parva Webb, 1974
- Hilarimorpha pitans Webb, 1974
- Hilarimorpha punata Webb, 1974
- Hilarimorpha pusilla Johnson, 1923
- Hilarimorpha reparta Webb, 1974
- Hilarimorpha rivara Webb, 1975
- Hilarimorpha robertsoni Webb, 1974
- Hilarimorpha sidora Webb, 1974
- Hilarimorpha singularis Webb, 1974
- Hilarimorpha stena Webb, 1974
- Hilarimorpha tempa Webb, 1974
- Hilarimorpha ussuriensis Makarkin, 1992
