= Turtle weed =

Turtle weed may refer to:

- Batis maritima, a vascular plant species
- Chlorodesmis, a genus of algae
- Chlorodesmis fastigiata, a species of algae
