= Incultus brockii =

Scientific classification
- Kingdom: Animalia
- Phylum: Arthropoda
- Clade: Pancrustacea
- Class: Malacostraca
- Order: Decapoda
- Suborder: Pleocyemata
- Infraorder: Brachyura
- Family: Portunidae
- Genus: Incultus
- Species: I. brockii

Binomial name
- Incultus brockii (De Man, 1888)

Synonyms
- Neptunus Brockii De Man, 1888; Portunus (Xiphonectes) brockii (De Man, 1888); Xiphonectes brockii (De Man, 1888)

Species of crab

Incultus brockii is a species of swimmer crab in the family Portunidae. It is found in sandy mud from Japan to the eastern Indian Ocean including China, Singapore, Philippines, Indonesia and Australia.
