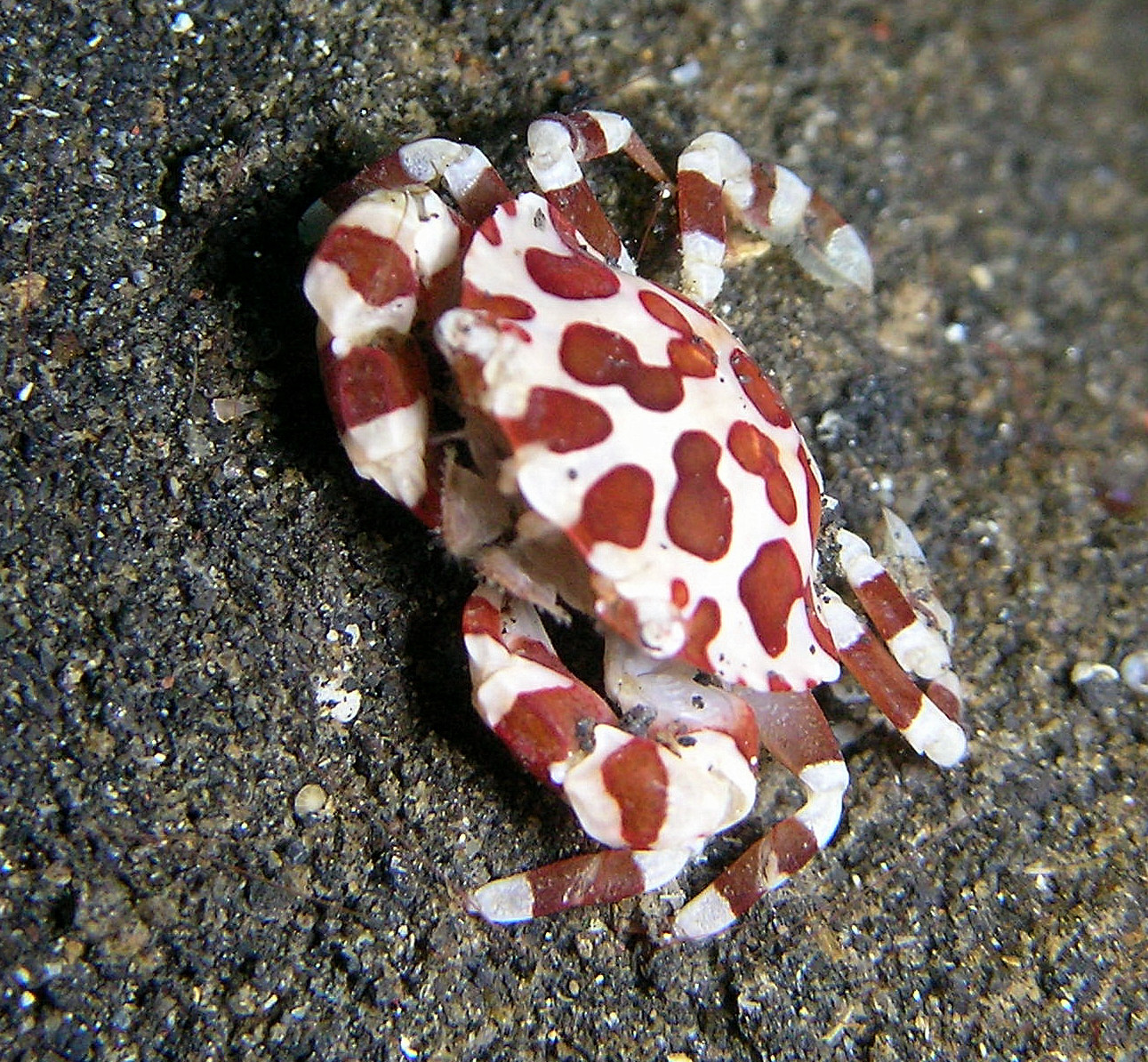

Scientific classification
- Kingdom: Animalia
- Phylum: Arthropoda
- Clade: Pancrustacea
- Class: Malacostraca
- Order: Decapoda
- Suborder: Pleocyemata
- Infraorder: Brachyura
- Family: Portunidae
- Genus: Lissocarcinus
- Species: L. orbicularis

Binomial name
- Lissocarcinus orbicularis Dana, 1852

Synonyms
- Lissocarcinus pulchellus Müller, 1887

= Lissocarcinus orbicularis =

Species of crab

Lissocarcinus orbicularis, common names sea cucumber crab, red-spotted white crab, and harlequin crab is a species of crab in the family Portunidae. This species gains one of its names from its close-knit relationship with holothuroids, the sea cucumbers. L. orbicularis should not be confused with L. laevis, a similar species of swimming crab, or Camposcia retusa, both of which are also commonly referred to as the harlequin crab. L. orbicularis displays numerous morphological and social adaptations for feeding and has a large distribution throughout the Indo-West Pacific.

== Morphology ==
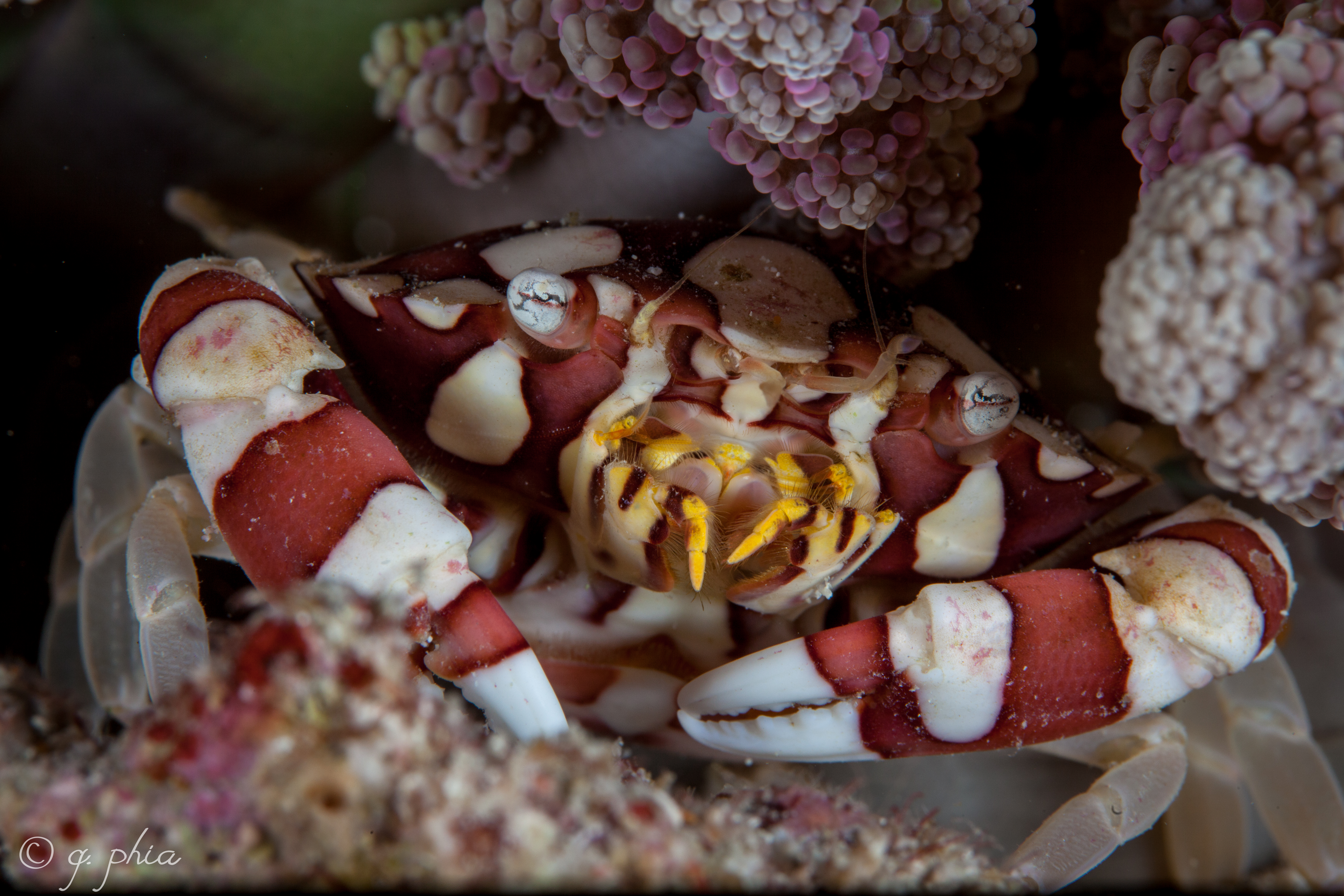
Close up Harlequin crab at Wakatobi, 2018

Lissocarcinus orbicularis grows to about 4 cm (1.6 in), and has a smooth, sub-circular carapace with a curved frontal margin that lacks defined teeth or a medial notch. L. orbicularis can be distinguished from L. holothuricola due to its generally smoother carapace. The carapace is broader than it is long, ranging from 0.3 to 1.4 cm in length, and has a highly medial convex dorsal surface.

L. orbicularis can be distinguished from other members of the Portunidae family by their distinctive spotted carapace and banded pereiopods. This pattern varies from red-brown with white spots to white or yellowish with red-brown spots. The patterning is symmetrically arranged with spots of various sizes. These spots have also been documented having a near-black border in individuals in the Celebes Sea. They also exhibit changes in carapace coloration and patterning during molting. The background carapace color typically mimics that of the body of their hosts, such as Thelenota ananas.

As Decapods, these crabs have ten legs, the first three pairs of which function for feeding and are referred to as maxillipeds. The remaining pairs are primarily walking legs referred to as pereiopods. The set of legs with enlarged pincers, or chelae, are further defined as chelipeds. This species is morphologically adapted to latch onto the integument of their hosts via "hooks" on each of their pereiopods. The pincer-like claws are also rounded, allowing these crabs to firmly attach to their hosts without causing damage.

Also designated true crabs, L. orbicularis and other Brachyurans, have all five pairs of legs fully visible and short tails typically hidden beneath the thorax. The abdomen of true crabs is also modified into a simple flap that is used to cover reproductive accessories and protect maturing eggs.

== Reproduction & Development ==
Unlike many marine invertebrates, the Harlequin crab partakes in a monogamous mating system and can be found inhabiting sea cucumbers in heterosexual pairs or along with their progeny.

This species also displays weak sexual dimorphism in which female crabs are significantly larger than their male counterparts. The larger size of females allows for greater resource allocation and energy utilization for producing offspring. Females have been observed to reproduce throughout the year, rearing roughly 500 eggs at a time. For most of the year, females also dominate in population numbers. These crabs undergo internal fertilization, with many females brooding their eggs until they are prepared to hatch as free-swimming, planktonic larvae.

In species of Portunidae, including L. orbicularis, the male will carry his anticipated mate, the female, in her pre-molt stage. For multiple days the two will remain in close proximity, with her carapace or sternum in direct contact with his sternum, until the female is prepared to molt. Subsequently, after molting, the two individuals mate. In many species the male may continue carrying the female after intercourse until her new integument has begun hardening to further ensure his sperm are properly established. Male individuals within the family Portunidae also often produce sperm plugs, blocking the females' genital duct in order to prevent insemination by other male competitors and to ensure fertilization by his own sperm, though it is not documented specifically in L. orbicularis.

== Ecology ==
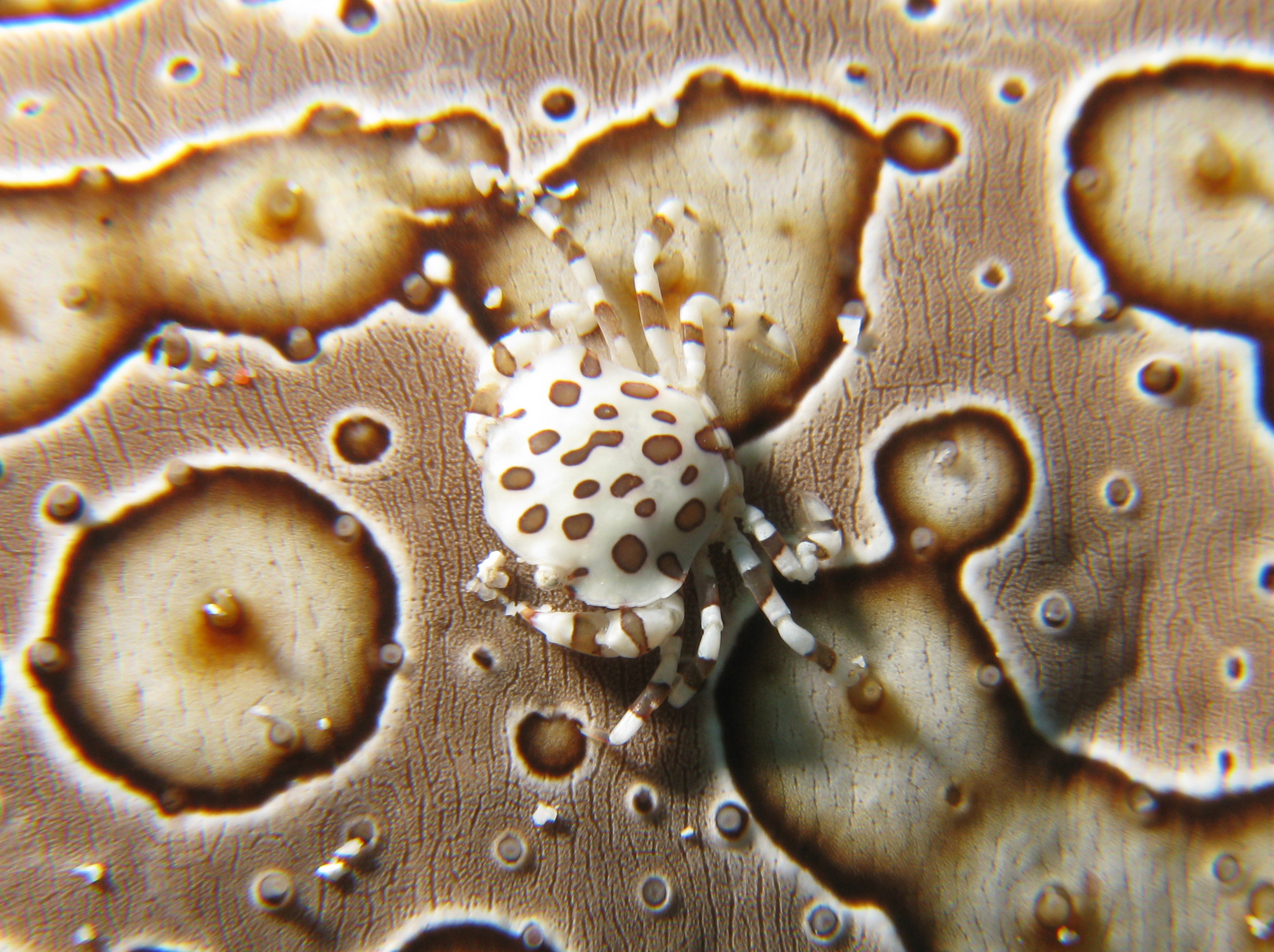
L. orbicularis attached to the outer body of Bohadschia argus

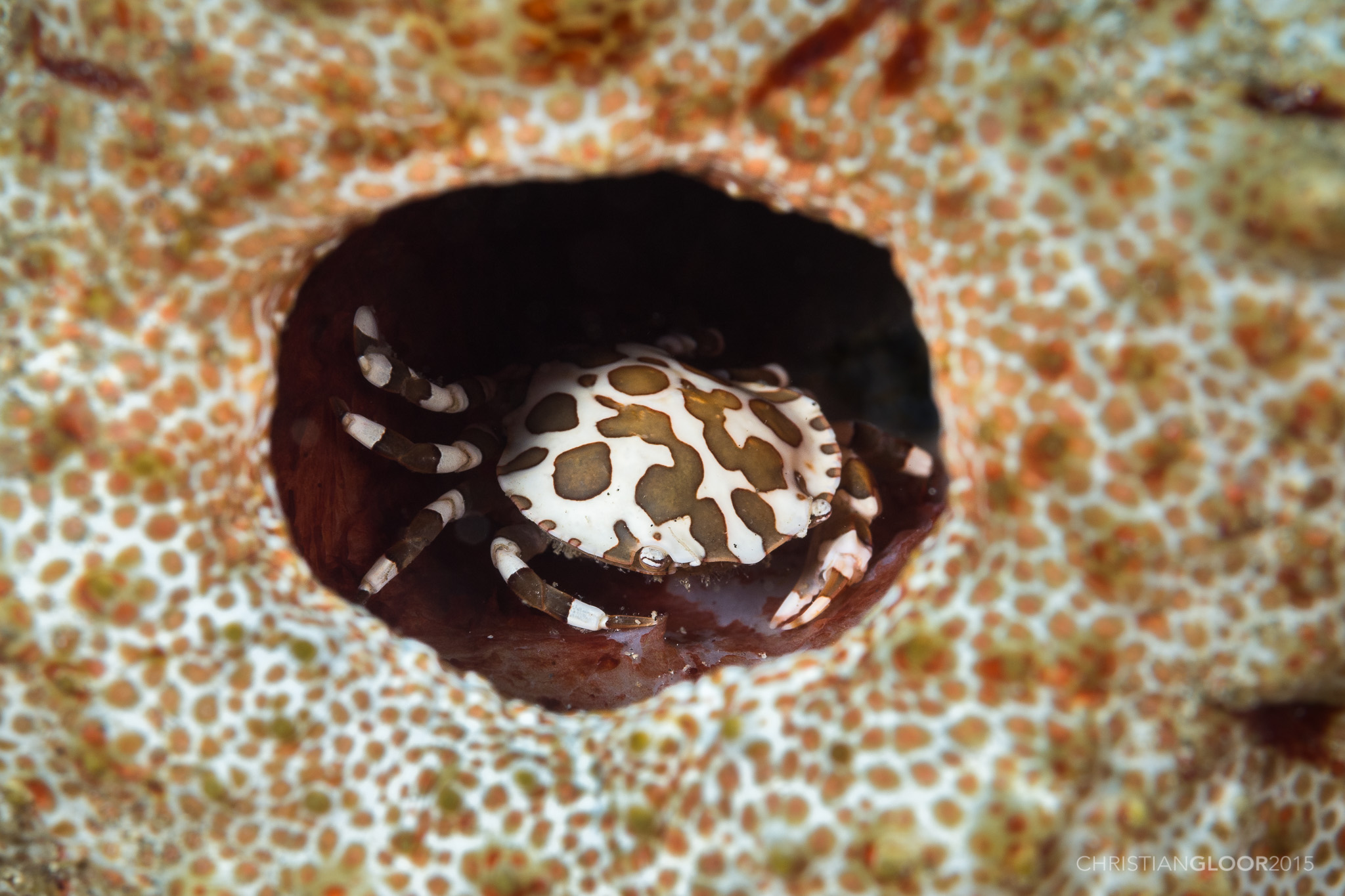
Sea cucumber crab inhabiting the anal cavity of a holothuroid host

Only three of nine species of the genus Lissocarcinus are known to be obligate symbionts of holothurians. The inter-specific interaction between Harlequin crabs and their sea cucumber hosts is a defining characteristic of this species. L. orbicularis specifically has a commensal relationship with certain sea cucumbers and has no known negative effects on their hosts. It can be found along the outer body integument within the gut cavity, or near the oral tentacles and anus of sea cucumber species Holothuria whitmaei, Actinopyga obesa, and most commonly Holothuria atra. Sea cucumbers are known to produce "cytotoxic secondary metabolites" known as saponins, to repel predators. Interestingly, these emissions also act as kairomones, which are chemical signals that attract symbiotic animals, including the Harlequin crab. These signals typically act to alert organisms of the sea cucumber's toxic nature, but in the case of the Harlequin crab and other symbionts these organisms have evolved to register the saponins as key signals alerting them to potential hosts. Living off a toxic host may also serve as a defense tool towards the Harlequin crab's own predators. Generally, they display a preference for larger holothuroids across the genera Thelenota, Bohadschia and Holothuria, likely due to their associated levels of toxicity and subsequent signaling.

Typically, only one adult crab or a heterosexual pair will occupy a single holothuroid host, although multi-infested individuals may be found with adult pairs and their young. Adults also display strong territorial defense against same-sex adults, guarding their host as they tend to be few and far between.

May be mistaken with L. laevis, which shares the same common name, though this species does not display the same banding pattern on all legs and it is a common symbiont on sea anemones rather than sea cucumbers.

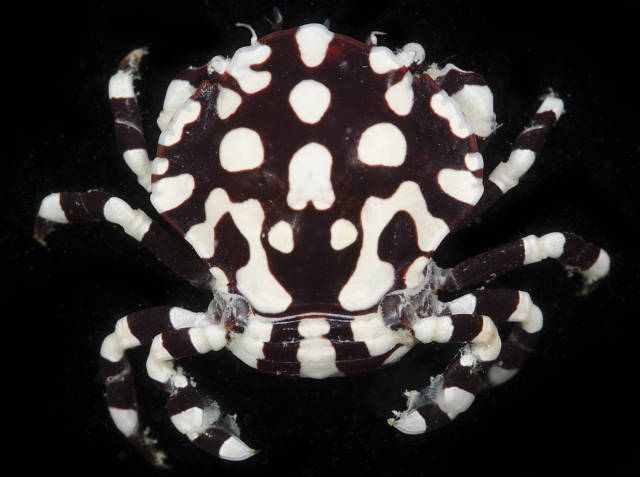
Lissocarcinus orbicularis

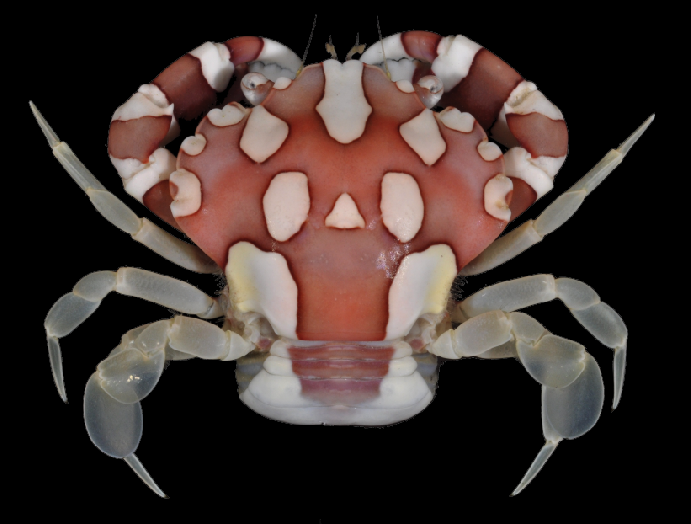
Lissocarcinus laevis

== Diet ==
L. orbicularis has an obligatory relationship with sea cucumbers of the genera Thelenota, Bohadschia and Holothuria, feeding on the surface tissue of these tropical echinoderms. Although these crabs feed off the upper integumentary layer, they do not cause their hosts any serious damage, classifying them as having a commensal relationship. While their hosts provide a significant component of nutrition, this species is also known to feed on a diverse array of food including sea grasses, and they also absorb and digest organic matter. Gastric mills, a moveable grinding apparatus in the pharynx, are used to eat the organic matter that their hosts intake or that is found on their exterior. A large proportion of these gastric mills have been discovered to be empty, suggesting that they do not continuously nor regularly feed. This variety of food sources blurs how their trophic relationship status is defined; though generally considered commensal and acquiring external food sources, they could be classified as parasites due to their infrequent feeding on sea cucumber spicules, or kleptoparasites because they also feed on the same sediment as their hosts.

== Distribution ==
The type locality for this species is Fiji, and it is widely distributed in shallow waters of the Indo-West Pacific, including Tanzania, Kenya, Somalia, Seychelles, Madagascar, Sri Lanka, Japan, Taiwan, Australia, Hawaii, and the eastern coast of South Africa. Nigam and his associates at the Zoological Survey of India also recorded Lissocarcinus orbicularis in the Maldives, Marshall Islands, Palau, Moorea Island, Society Islands, Philippines, Gulf of Tadjoura in Djibouti, Moorea Island, Society Islands, Mayotte Island, Comoros Islands, Caroline Islands, New Caledonia, Oman, Papua New Guinea, Vanuatu, Europa Island, Iles Eparses, and most recently India, in addition to the previously listed regions. It is also found in the Red Sea. Individuals in Madagascar were described as tending to associate with holothuroids living in sea grass beds, at the end of external slopes, on patchy reefs or reef flats near external slopes. In India, L. orbicularis was also found to associate with echinoderms in a major coral reef community, including individuals of the Classes Crinoidea, Holothuroidea, and Echinoidea.

The first collection of L. orbicularis, and a member of Portunidae in general, reported in Taiwan was in the 90s andThelenota ananas was the first host of Harlequin crabs recorded near a Malaysian island in the north east of the Celebes Sea in 2012.
