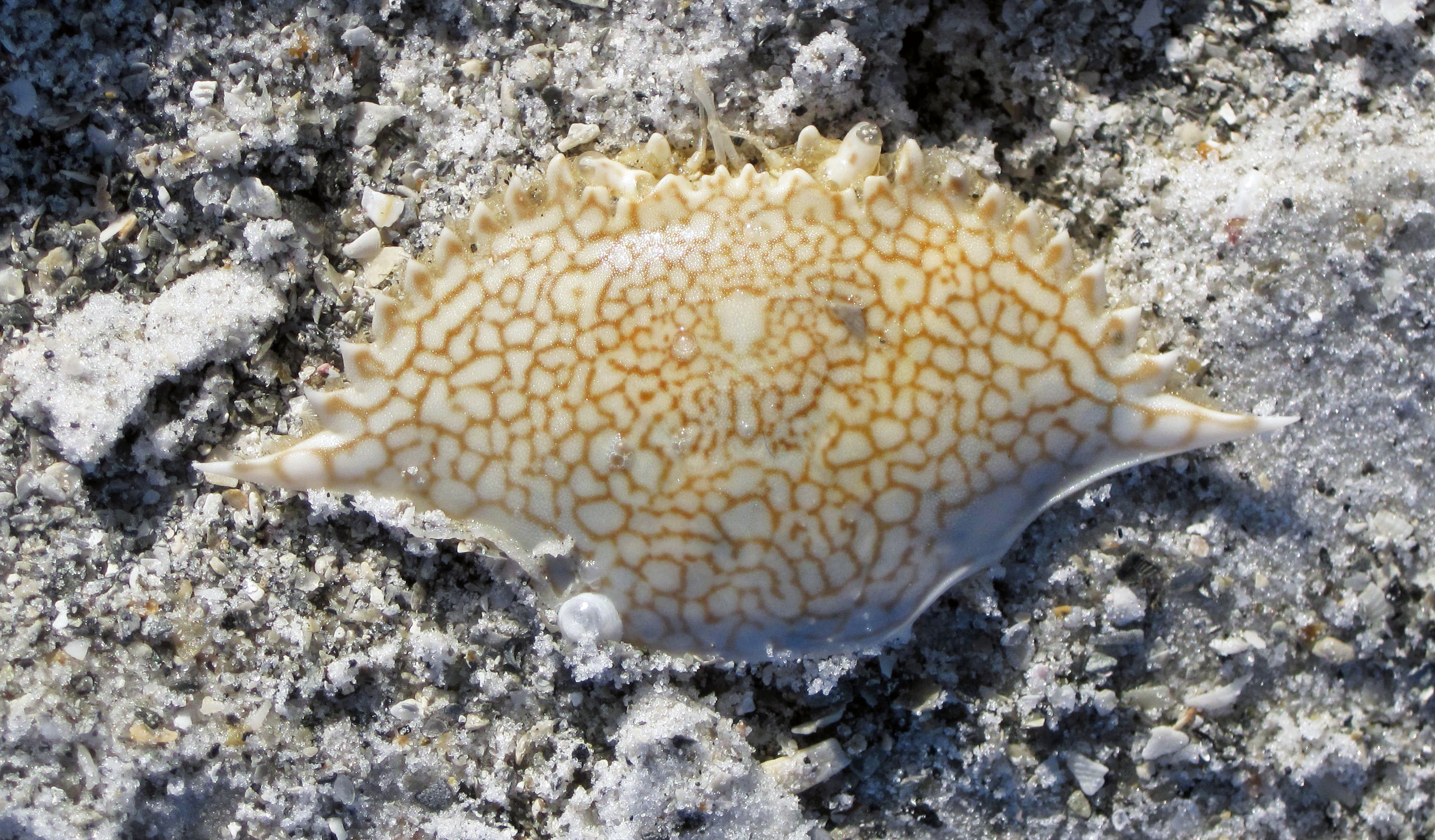

Scientific classification
- Kingdom: Animalia
- Phylum: Arthropoda
- Clade: Pancrustacea
- Class: Malacostraca
- Order: Decapoda
- Suborder: Pleocyemata
- Infraorder: Brachyura
- Family: Portunidae
- Genus: Arenaeus
- Species: A. cribrarius

Binomial name
- Arenaeus cribrarius (Lamarck, 1818)

Synonyms
- Portunus cribrarius Lamarck, 1818; Lupa maculata Say, 1818; Arenaeus websteri Jones, 1968

= Arenaeus cribrarius =

Species of crustacean

Arenaeus cribrarius, the speckled swimming crab, is a species of swimming crab in the family Portunidae.

== Habitat ==
The crabs can be found from Massachusetts, U.S. to areas in Argentina. They are common in shallow water on sand in ocean beaches, but can be found in depths up to two hundred feet (61 m) deep. They are typically found in temperate or tropical waters between eleven and twenty-nine degrees Celsius with a salinity between twenty-eight and thirty-five PSU. Arenaeus cribrarius often bury themselves entirely in sand, but leave a gap for water to pass to their gills. The crabs maintain the gap by clearing the sand with their claws and hairs around their mouth area. Arenaeus cribrarius is a nocturnal and solitary organism, which only interacts with other crabs of its species when it wants to breed.

=== Feeding ===
The Speckled swimming crab eats primarily detritus, but have also been recorded eating fish, mollusks, and other crustaceans. They ambush prey that go near their buried bodies. Speckled swimming crabs have been recorded capturing sea turtle hatchlings. Sea turtles are the primary predator to Arenaeus cribrarius. The crabs use their coloration and spines to ward off such predators.

== Anatomy ==
They share a very similar overall shape with the Atlantic Blue Crab. The carapace of a Speckled swimming crab is light brown, light maroon, or olive with many white or tan irregular round spots. The males tend to be more colorful. The carapace can reach lengths between 4.5 and 6 inches wide (~120-150mm). Each side of the carapace consists of nine lateral teeth with the last extending outward. Between the eye sockets there are six partially fused frontal teeth.

Arenaeus cribrarius has ten legs since it is a part of the order decapoda. The first four pairs of legs have yellow tips and are used for walking. These are referred to as broad pereopods. They fifth pair of pereopods are used for swimming. They are a wide flattened paddle shape. Overall, Arenaeus cribrarius can weigh as much as forty-five grams (1.6 ounces).

== Reproduction ==
When the Arenaeus cribrarius reaches sexual maturity around five to seven years of age they begin to mate. Arenaeus cribrarius breed year-round and are polygynandrous. The male crab, who is between molts, will select a premolt female who is expressing courtship behavior. The crabs communicate with one another through chemical, visual, and acoustic cues. The male then carries the female for thirty days in a precopulatory position under his body until the female molts. When the female's shell is still soft the male will invert her to position themselves with their abdomens in contact together. The male then transfers his spermatophores to her gonopores. Once mating has occurred, the eggs will spawn around fifty-seven days later and will have an fecundity between 135,000 and 680,000. Nauplia will hatch from the Speckled swimming crab eggs around eighteen days and will grow into the first stage of crab thirteen days later. The average age for a Speckled swimming crab is two years.

== Commercial usage ==
In some parts of the world Arenaeus cribrarius is important in fisheries, particularly along the Brazilian coast. The crab is harvested for its meat and residual proteins are used to produce fertilizers and feed for livestock. Along with the consumption of meat, the Speckled swimming crab is harvested for its byproducts. Chitin can be extracted from the crab and used in products like adhesives, cosmetics, photographic emulsions, and anticoagulants.
