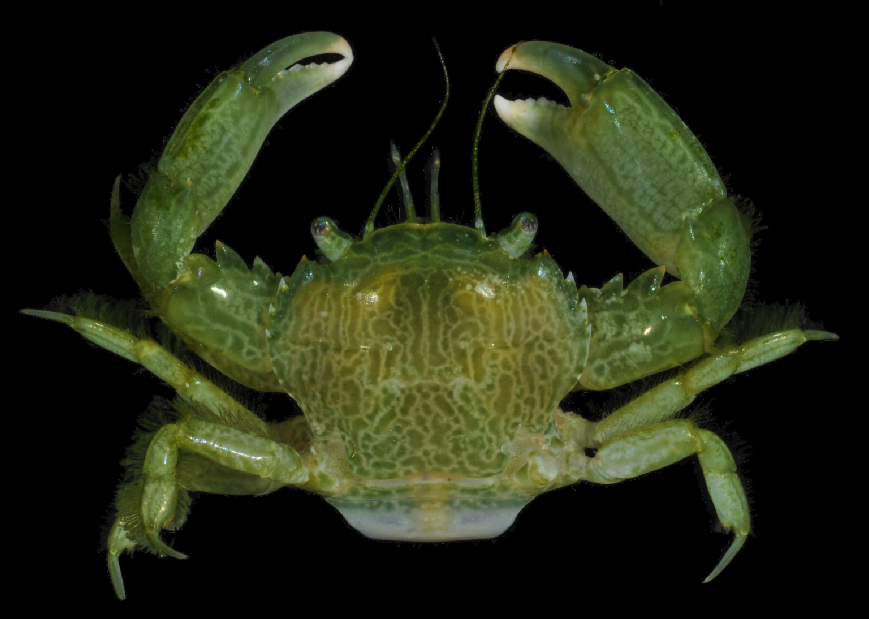

Scientific classification
- Kingdom: Animalia
- Phylum: Arthropoda
- Clade: Pancrustacea
- Class: Malacostraca
- Order: Decapoda
- Suborder: Pleocyemata
- Infraorder: Brachyura
- Family: Portunidae
- Genus: Caphyra
- Species: C. rotundifrons

Binomial name
- Caphyra rotundifrons (A. Milne-Edwards, 1869)

Synonyms
- Camptonyx rotundifrons A. Milne-Edwards, 1869; Trierarchus rotundifrons A. Milne-Edwards, 1869

= Caphyra rotundifrons =

Species of herbivorous crab

Caphyra rotundifrons is a species of crab in the genus Caphyra. It is notable for being strictly herbivorous, with a diet adapted to the algae Chlorodesmis fastigiata.

== Description ==
It is lime green in colour, similar to that of the algae it selectively shelters in and feeds on.

== Ecology ==
Caphyra rotundifrons has a diet specialized to the macroalgae Chlorodesmis fastigiata. Its use of this algae as a food source and habitat leads it to experience reduced predation, since the algae is toxic and shunned by both herbivorous and carnivorous fish.

== Taxonomy ==
The genus Caphyra is currently placed in the subfamily Thalamitinae of the family Portunidae.
