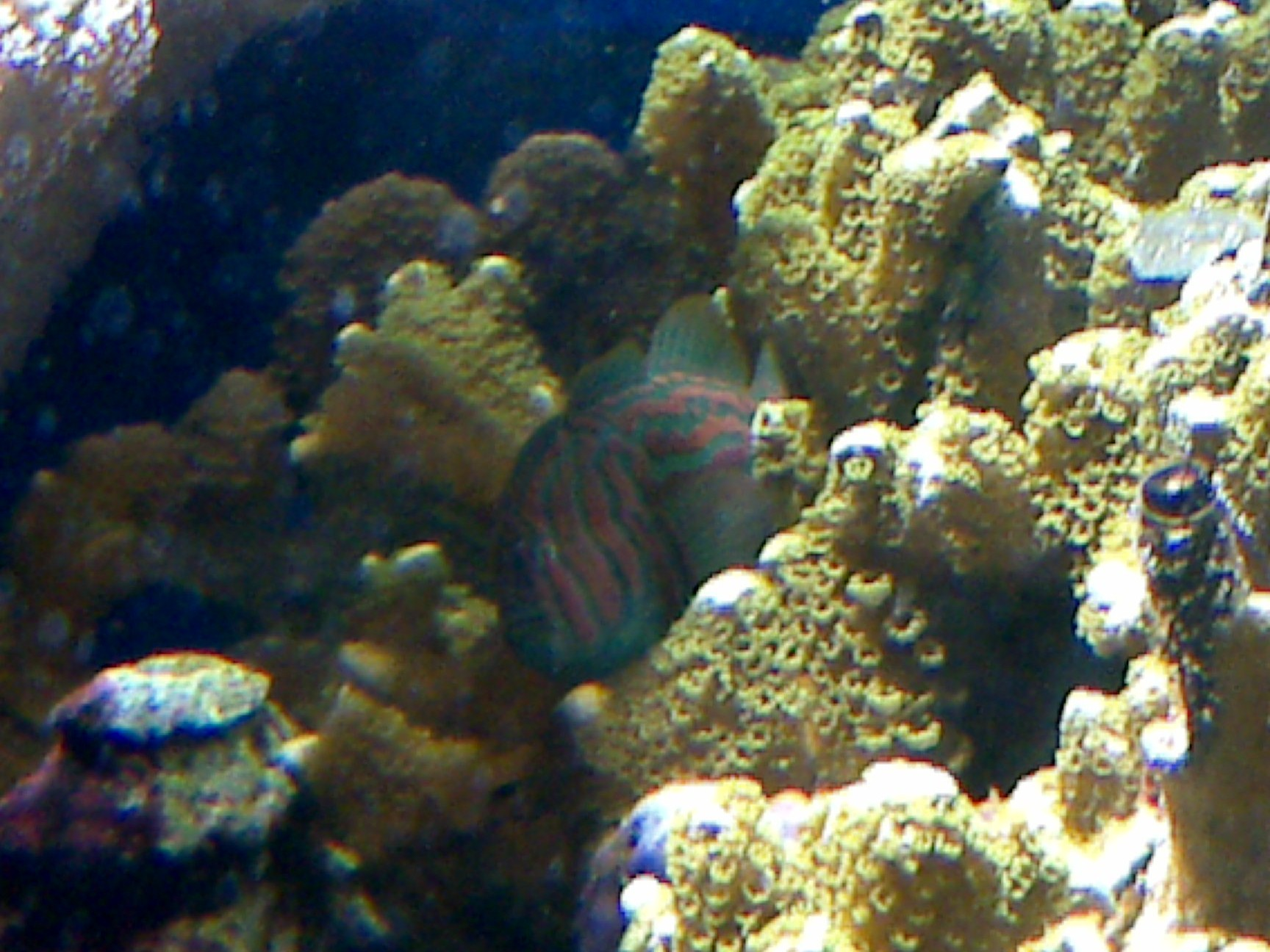

Conservation status
- Least Concern (IUCN 3.1)

Scientific classification
- Kingdom: Animalia
- Phylum: Chordata
- Class: Actinopterygii
- Order: Gobiiformes
- Family: Gobiidae
- Genus: Gobiodon
- Species: G. histrio

Binomial name
- Gobiodon histrio (Valenciennes, 1837)

Synonyms
- Gobius histrio Valenciennes, 1837; Gobiodon unicolor (Castelnau, 1873); Gobiodon verticalis Alleyne & W. J. Macleay, 1877

= Gobiodon histrio =

Species of fish

Gobiodon histrio, the Broad-barred goby, is a species of goby native to the Indian Ocean from the Red Sea to the western Pacific Ocean to southern Japan, Samoa and the Great Barrier Reef. This species is a reef dweller, being found at depths of from 2 to 15 metres (6.6 to 49.2 ft). It can reach a length of 3.5 centimetres (1.4 in) TL. This species can also be found in the aquarium trade.

This fish produces a toxin that deters predators. When disturbed, it releases compounds that inhibit the locomotion of other fish. At high enough concentrations, the toxin causes the predator to lose equilibrium and tip over. It takes part in a mutualistic relationship with a species of coral, Acropora nasuta. When the coral is damaged by toxic Chlorodesmis algae, it produces a compound that attracts the fish. The fish eat the alga and this enhances their toxicity.

G. histrio can change sex in either direction. When a pair of gobies of the same sex colonize a new coral patch, one of them changes to the opposite sex.
