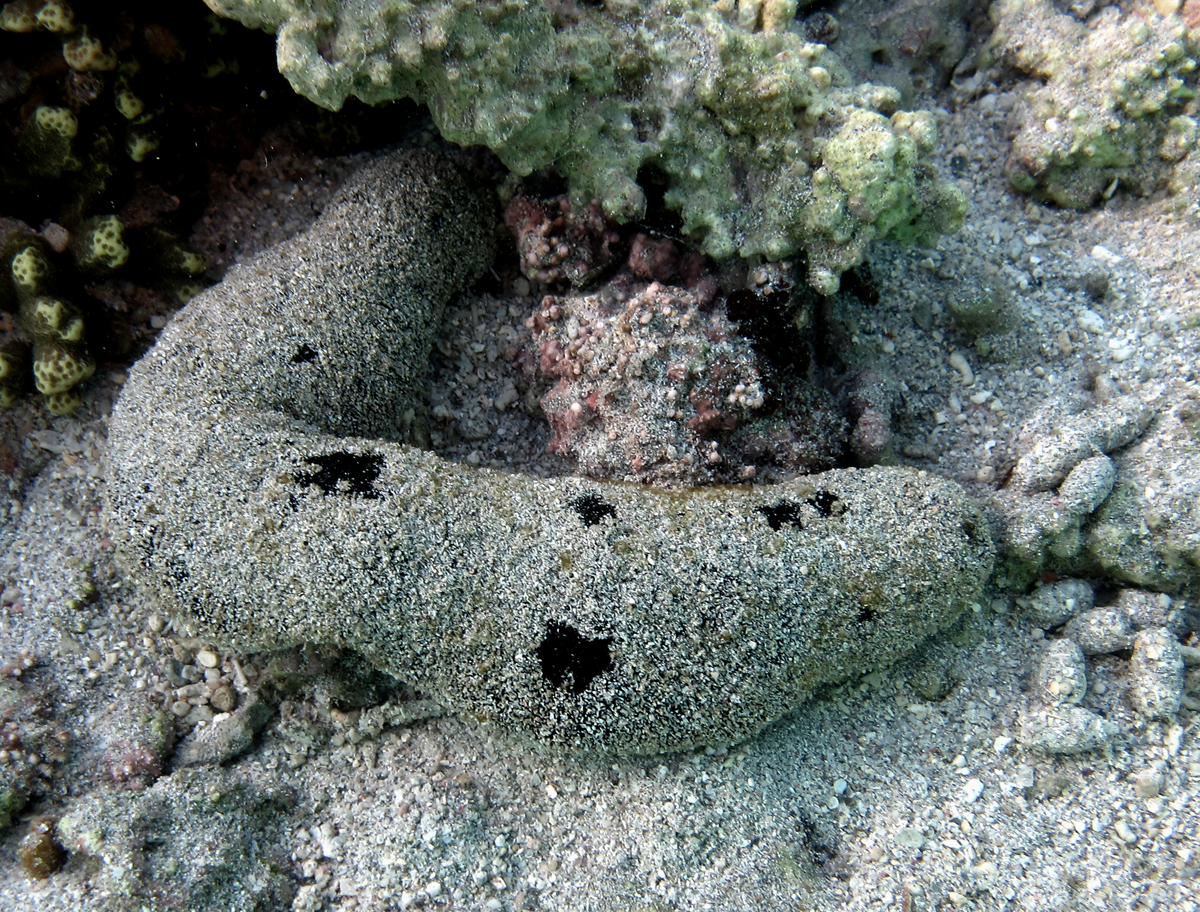

Conservation status
- Least Concern (IUCN 3.1)

Scientific classification
- Kingdom: Animalia
- Phylum: Echinodermata
- Class: Holothuroidea
- Order: Holothuriida
- Family: Holothuriidae
- Genus: Holothuria
- Species: H. atra

Binomial name
- Holothuria atra Jaeger, 1833

Synonyms
- Halodeima atra Jaeger, 1833; Holothuria affinis Brandt, 1835; Holothuria amboinensis Semper, 1868; Holothuria radackensis Chamisso & Eysenhardt, 1821; Holothuria sanguinolenta Saville-Kent, 1893

= Holothuria atra =

Species of sea cucumber

Holothuria atra, commonly known as the black sea cucumber or lollyfish, is a species of marine invertebrate in the family Holothuriidae. It was placed in the subgenus Halodeima by Pearson in 1914, making its full scientific name Holothuria (Halodeima) atra. It is the type species of the subgenus.

== Description ==
Holothuria atra is a sea cucumber that can grow to a length of 60 centimetres (24 in) but 20 centimetres (7.9 in) is a more common size. It has a smooth, pliable, entirely black skin which often has sand adhering to it, especially in smaller individuals. The mouth is on the underside at one end and is surrounded by a fringe of 20 black, branched tentacles. The anus is at the other end.

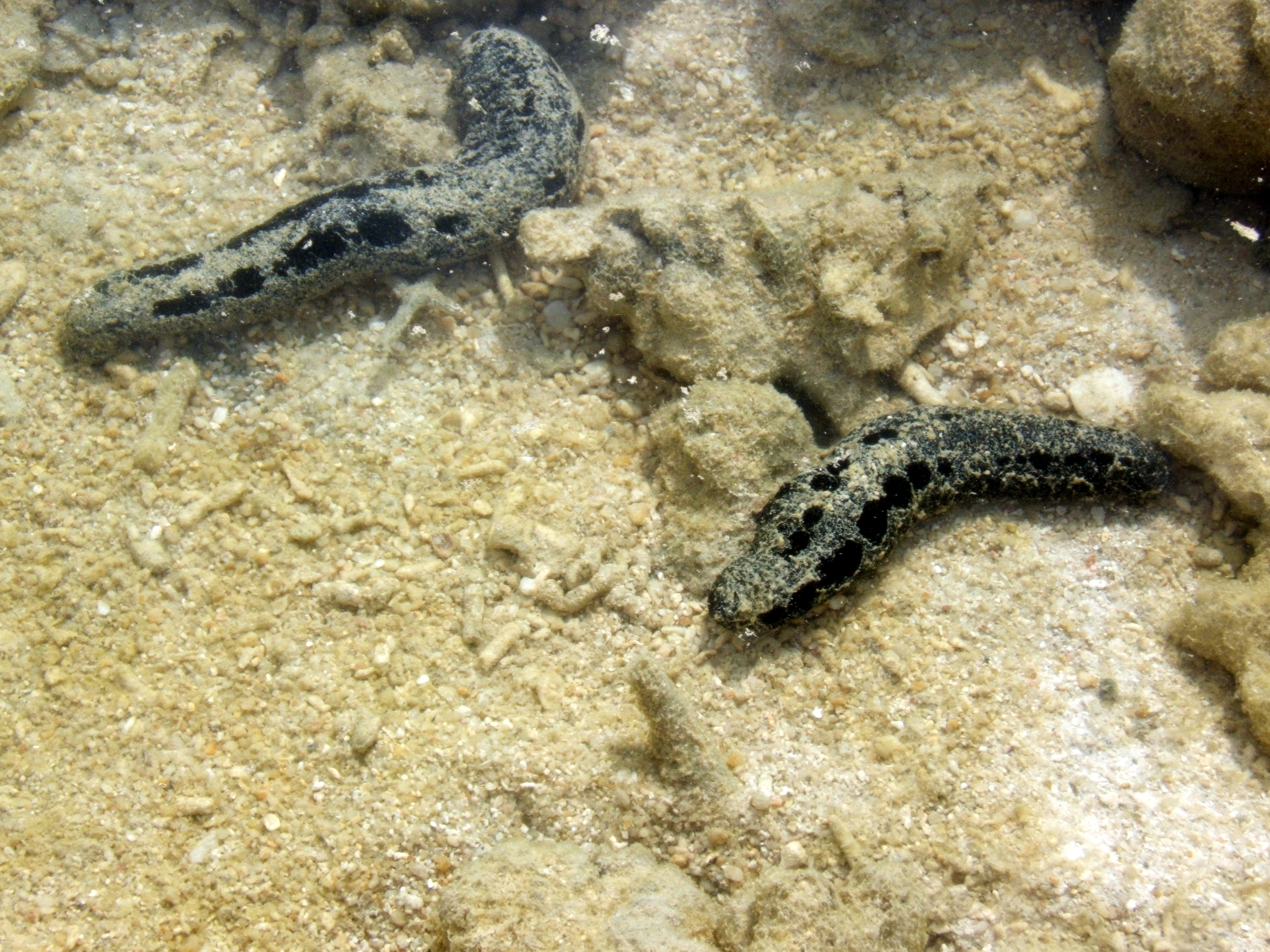
In Malaysia

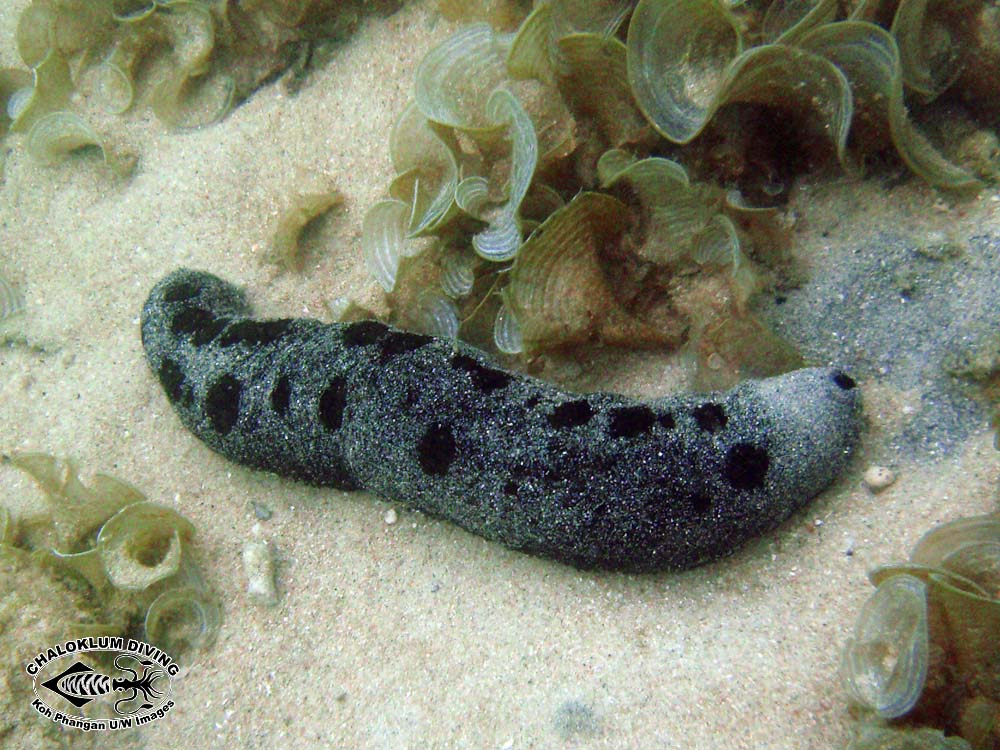
In Thailand

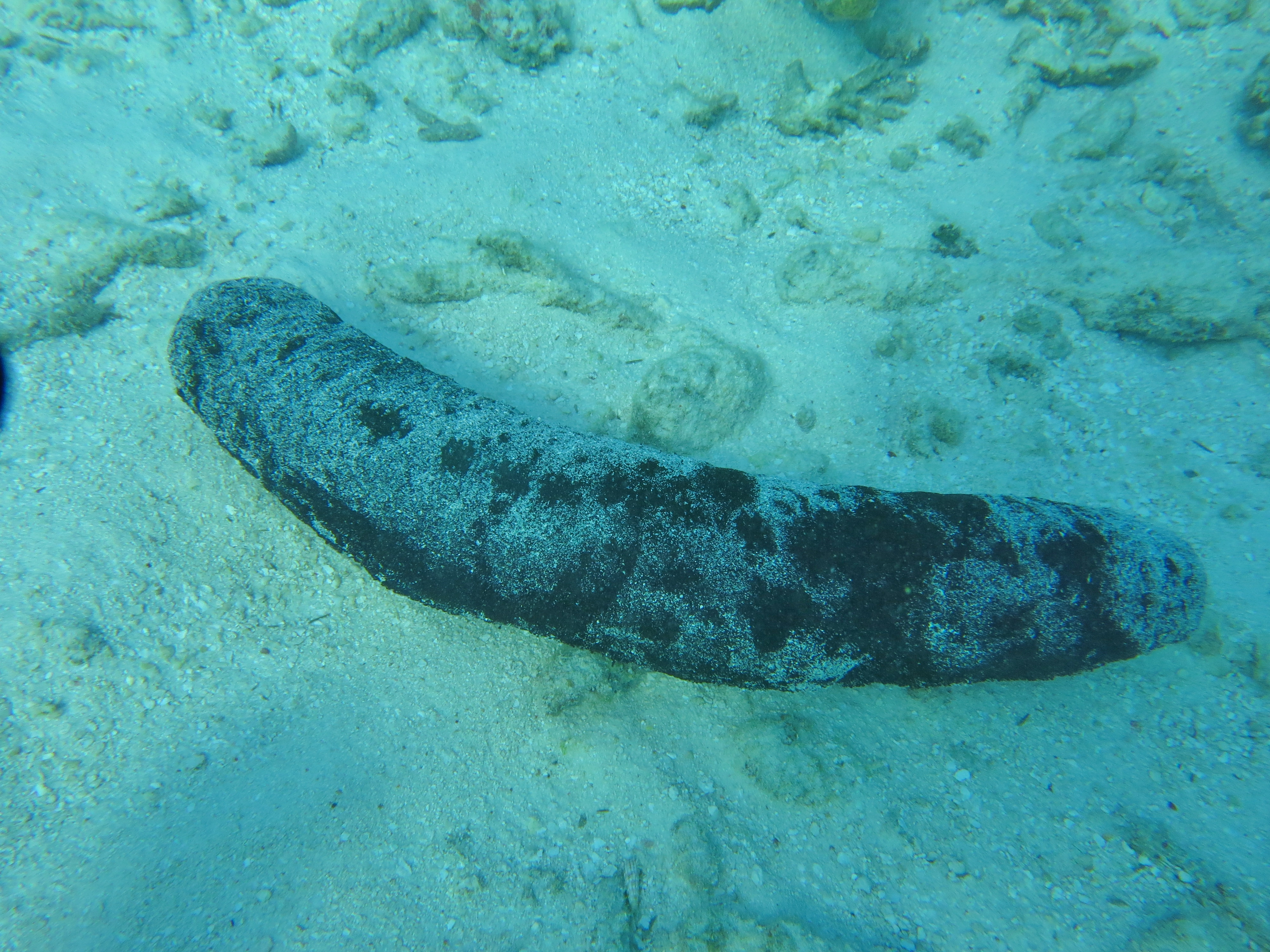
In Maldives

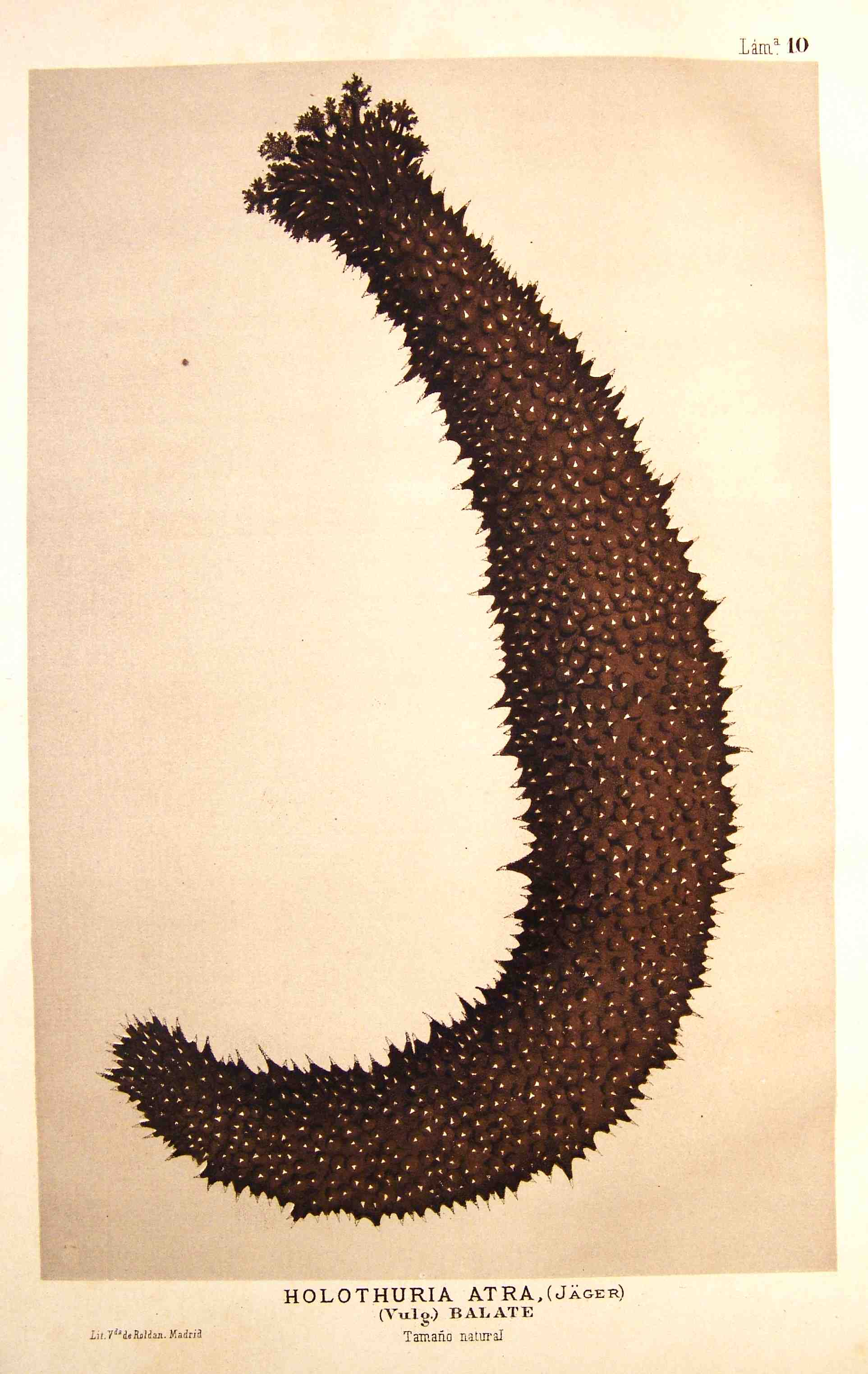
Drawing

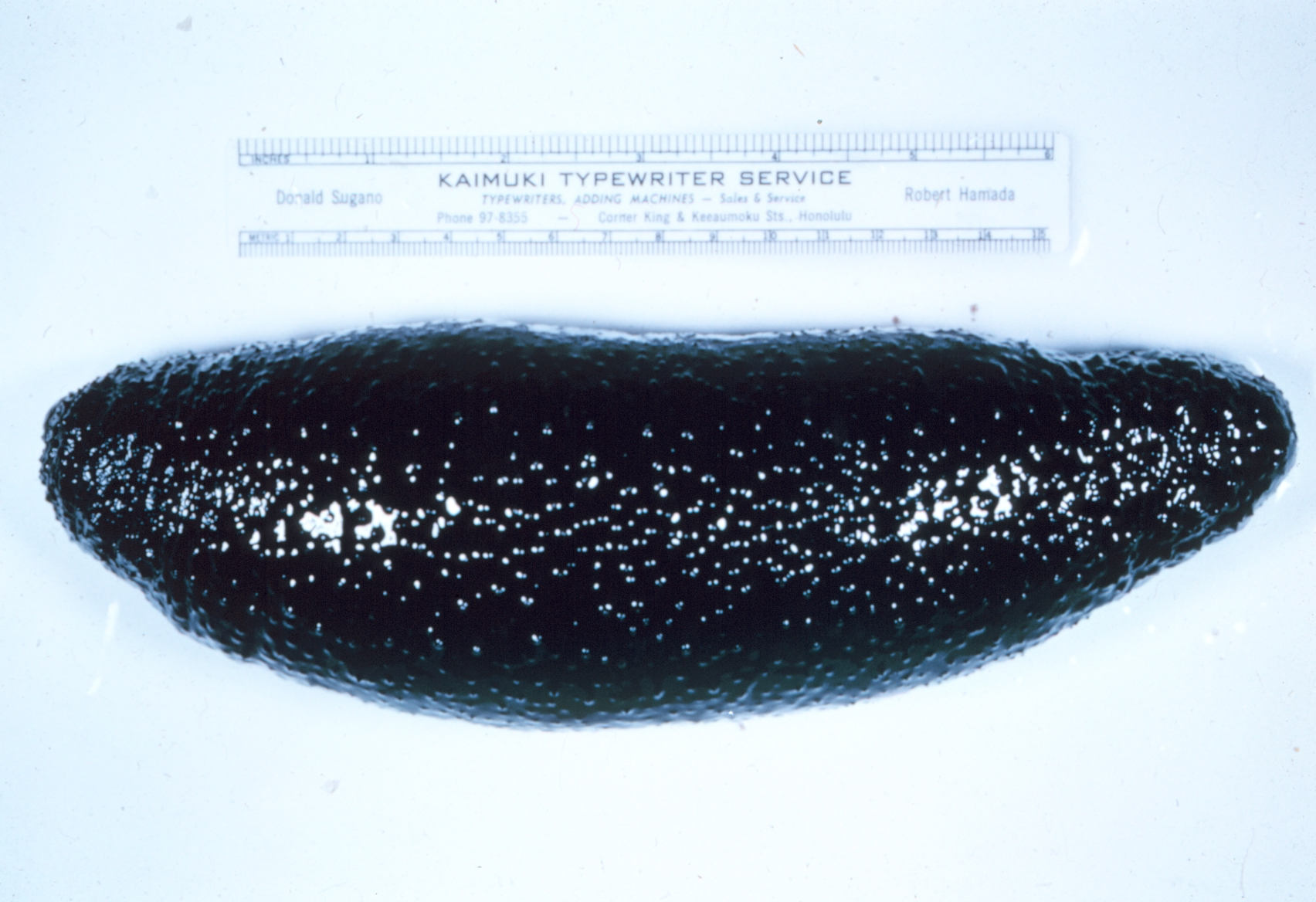
Museum specimen

== Distribution and habitat ==
Holothuria atra is found in the tropical Indo-Pacific region, its range extending from the Red Sea and East Africa to Australia. It is found on the seabed, in shallow waters on reefs and sand flats and in seagrass meadows at depths of up to 20 metres (66 ft). Its colouring makes it conspicuous but it is very often camouflaged by a coating of sand which may also serve to keep it cool by protecting it from the sun's rays. It favours reef flats where it is not fully exposed to the waves but the water is well aerated, and shallows beside slabs of rock from under which cool water wells out when the tide retreats. In such places it is often found in pools above the low tide mark which are warmed by the sun during the day. Holothuria atra seems to tolerate these high temperatures well and individuals appeared healthy and were feeding when the water temperature rose as high as 39 °C.

== Biology ==
Holothuria atra is an omnivore, sifting through the sediment with its tentacles and feeding on detritus and other organic matter. As a defence against predators, Holothuria atra emits a toxic red fluid when its skin is rubbed or damaged. When attacked, it does not eject Cuvierian tubules in the way that some sea cucumbers do, but instead extrudes its internal organs through its anus.

It is not possible to distinguish between male and female Holothuria atra externally. Maturity is reached at a body length of about 16 centimetres (6.3 in) and spawning mostly takes place during the summer and autumn although in equatorial waters it may take place all year round. It takes a minimum of 18-25 days for Holothuria atra to reach natural competence. Holothuria atra is also fissiparous, meaning that it can reproduce by transverse fission. It is mostly smaller individuals which divide in this way. A constriction appears, becomes deeper and deeper, and after some time the integument separates leaving two relatively wide but short individuals. No sand adheres to the newly separated surfaces as there are no tube feet present to retain the grains.

== Ecology ==
Holothuria atra, like many echinoderms, engage in sediment bioturbation—a process which plays an important role in the health of coral reefs. Holothuria atra is often found associated with the polychaete worm Gastrolepidia clavigera, a black worm which crawls about over the sea cucumber's skin. Holothuria atra seems to have few natural predators.

Lissocarcinus orbicularis, a small crab, is known to live on this species in a commensal relationship.

== Uses ==
In the Pacific Islands, Holothuria atra is collected by diving or by wading at low tide, and used for human consumption; its commercial value, however, is low. On Guam, the toxic red fluid that Holothuria atra releases is utilized to drive octopuses out of hiding holes.

Compounds of potential biomedical importance are present in Holothuria atra, including lectin, steroidal sapogenins and triterpene glycoside.
