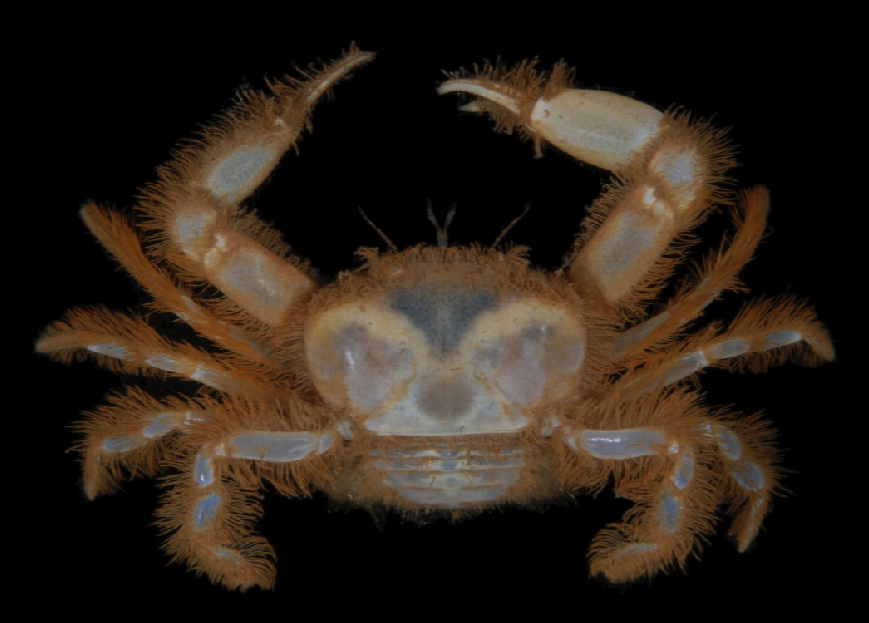

Scientific classification
- Domain: Eukaryota
- Kingdom: Animalia
- Phylum: Arthropoda
- Class: Malacostraca
- Order: Decapoda
- Suborder: Pleocyemata
- Infraorder: Brachyura
- Family: Portunidae
- Subfamily: Carupinae
- Genus: Libystes; A. Milne-Edwards, 1867

Type species
- Libystes nitidus A. Milne-Edwards, 1867

Synonyms
- Carcinoplacoides Kesling, 1958

= Libystes =

Genus of crabs

Libystes is a genus of crabs, containing six species:

- Libystes edwardsi Alcock, 1899
- Libystes lepidus Takeda & Miyake, 1970
- Libystes nitidus A. Milne-Edwards, 1867
- Libystes paucidentatus Stephenson & Campbell, 1960
- Libystes vietnamensis Tien, 1969
- Libystes villosus Rathbun, 1924
