= Incultus =

Scientific classification
- Kingdom: Animalia
- Phylum: Arthropoda
- Clade: Pancrustacea
- Class: Malacostraca
- Order: Decapoda
- Suborder: Pleocyemata
- Infraorder: Brachyura
- Family: Portunidae
- Subfamily: Portuninae
- Genus: Incultus; Koch, Spiridonov & Ďuriš, 2022

Genus of crabs

Incultus is a genus of crabs in the family Portunidae. It contains three species.

== Species ==
Incultus contains the following species:

- Incultus alcocki (Nobili, 1906)
- Incultus brockii (De Man, 1888)
- Incultus tuberculosus (A. Milne-Edwards, 1861)
