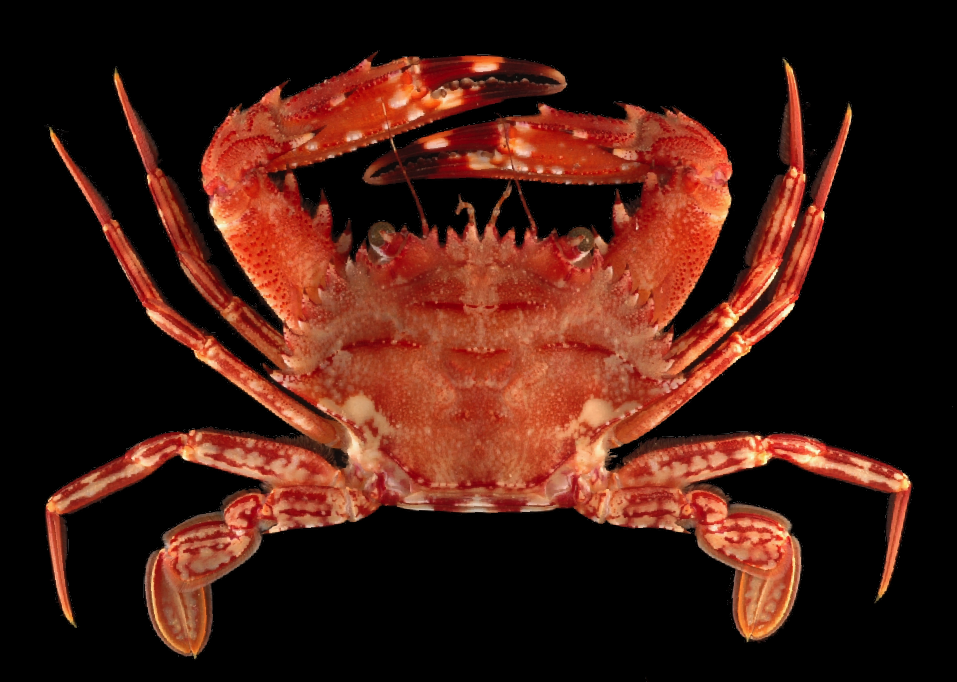
- Cronius ruber

Scientific classification
- Domain: Eukaryota
- Kingdom: Animalia
- Phylum: Arthropoda
- Class: Malacostraca
- Order: Decapoda
- Suborder: Pleocyemata
- Infraorder: Brachyura
- Family: Portunidae
- Subfamily: Portuninae
- Genus: Cronius; Stimpson, 1860

Species
- Cronius ruber (Lamarck, 1818); Cronius tumidulus (Stimpson, 1871)

Synonyms
- Charybdella Rathbun, 1897

= Cronius =

Genus of crabs

Cronius is a genus of crabs containing the two species Cronius ruber and Cronius tumidulus.
