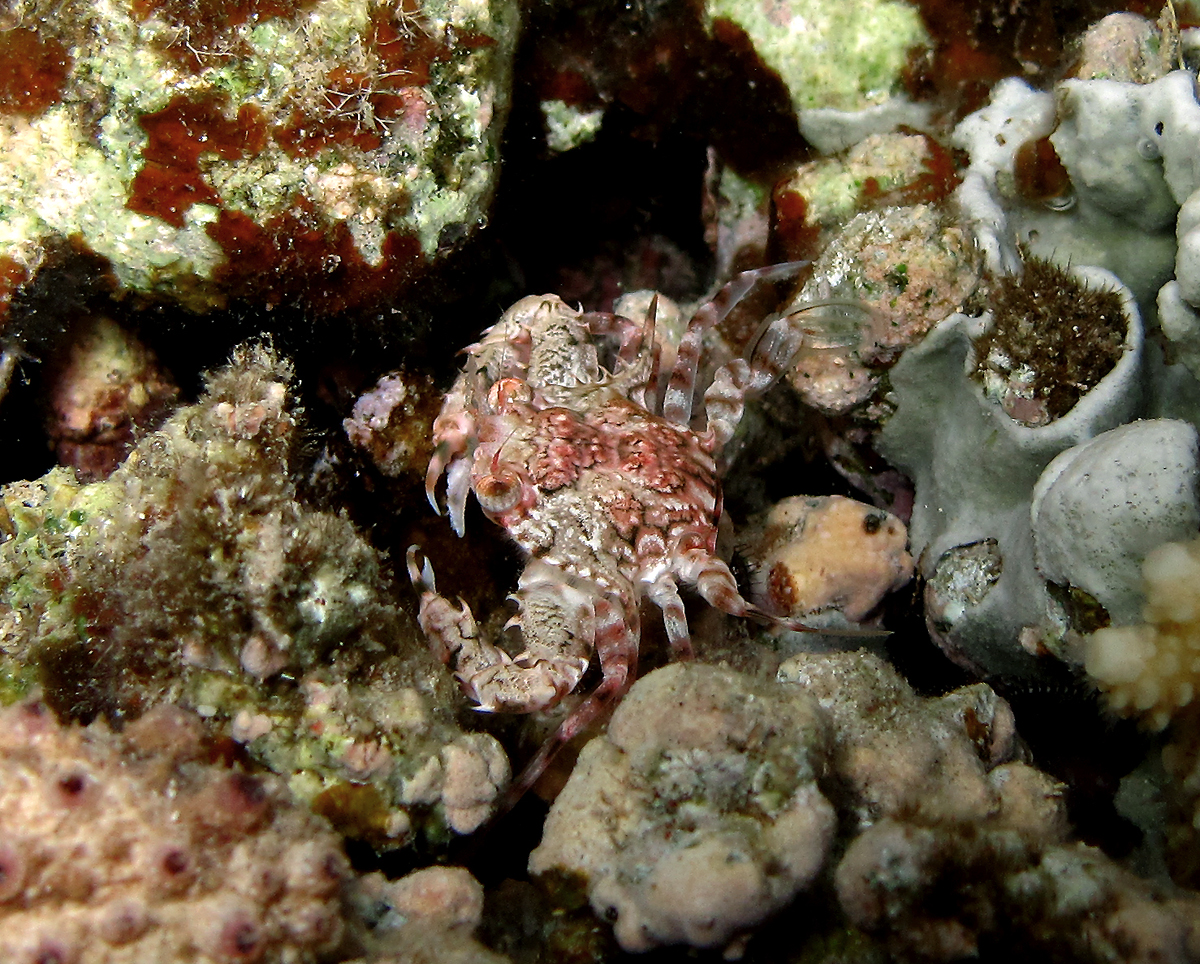
- Xiphonectes longispinosus

Scientific classification
- Kingdom: Animalia
- Phylum: Arthropoda
- Class: Malacostraca
- Order: Decapoda
- Suborder: Pleocyemata
- Infraorder: Brachyura
- Family: Portunidae
- Subfamily: Portuninae
- Genus: Xiphonectes; A. Milne-Edwards, 1873

Type species
- Amphitrite vigilans Dana, 1852

= Xiphonectes =

Genus of crabs

Xiphonectes (from Ancient Greek ξίφος (xíphos), meaning "sword", and νήκτης (nḗktēs), meaning "swimmer") is a genus of crabs within the family Portunidae. Members of this genus are found distributed in the Indian and Pacific Ocean.

== Species ==
- Xiphonectes aculeatus Koch & Ďuriš, 2019
- Xiphonectes bidens (Laurie, 1906)
- Xiphonectes gracillimus (Stimpson, 1858)
- Xiphonectes guinotae (Stephenson & Rees, 1961)
- Xiphonectes hainanensis (Chen, 1986)
- Xiphonectes iranjae (Crosnier, 1962)
- Xiphonectes latibrachium (Rathbun, 1906)
- Xiphonectes leptocheles A. Milne-Edwards, 1873
- Xiphonectes longispinosus (Dana, 1852)
- Xiphonectes macrophthalmus (Rathbun, 1906)
- Xiphonectes paralatibrachium (Crosnier, 2002)
- Xiphonectes stephensoni (Moosa, 1981)
- Xiphonectes tenuicaudatus (Stephenson, 1961)
- Xiphonectes tuerkayi Spiridonov, 2016
