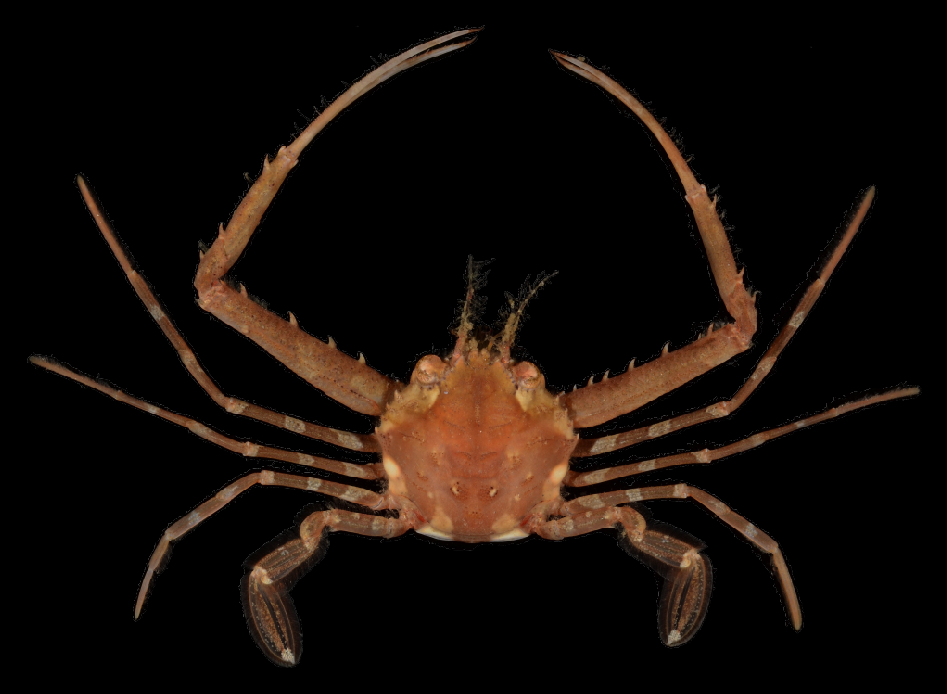
- Lupocyclus philippinensis

Scientific classification
- Domain: Eukaryota
- Kingdom: Animalia
- Phylum: Arthropoda
- Class: Malacostraca
- Order: Decapoda
- Suborder: Pleocyemata
- Infraorder: Brachyura
- Family: Portunidae
- Subfamily: Portuninae
- Genus: Lupocyclus; Adams & White, 1849

Type species
- Lupocyclus rotundatus Adams & White, 1849

= Lupocyclus =

Genus of crabs

Lupocyclus is a genus of crabs, containing six species:

- Lupocyclus inaequalis (Walker, 1887)
- Lupocyclus mauriciensis Ward, 1942
- Lupocyclus philippinensis Semper, 1880 (scissor swimming crab)
- Lupocyclus quinquedentatus Rathbun, 1906
- Lupocyclus rotundatus Adams & White, 1849
- Lupocyclus tugelae Barnard, 1950
