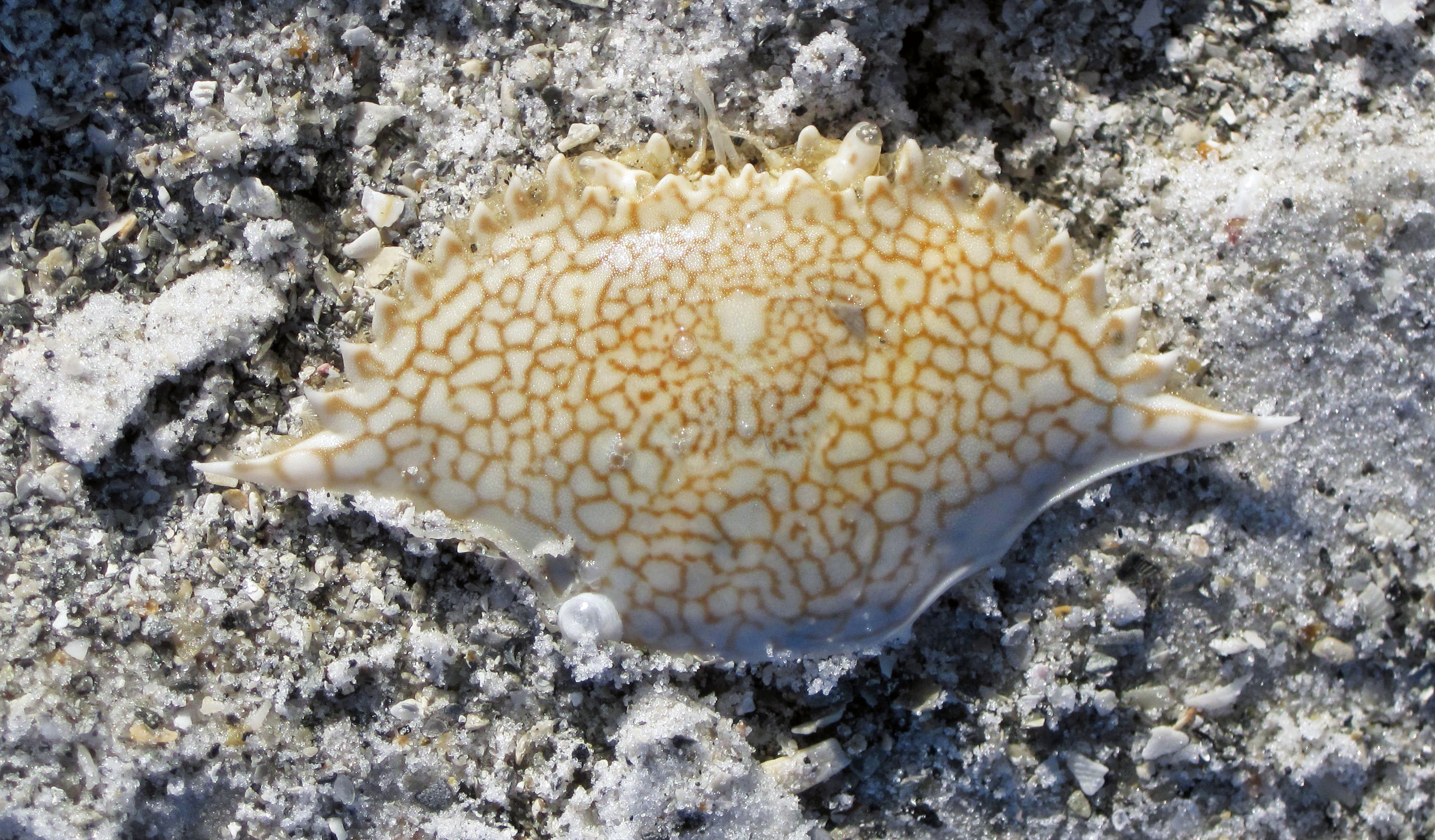
- Arenaeus cribrarius

Scientific classification
- Domain: Eukaryota
- Kingdom: Animalia
- Phylum: Arthropoda
- Class: Malacostraca
- Order: Decapoda
- Suborder: Pleocyemata
- Infraorder: Brachyura
- Family: Portunidae
- Subfamily: Portuninae
- Genus: Arenaeus; Dana, 1851

= Arenaeus =

Genus of crabs

Arenaeus is a genus of swimming crabs in the family Portunidae. These two species belong to the genus Arenaeus:

- Arenaeus cribrarius (Lamarck, 1818)
- Arenaeus mexicanus (Gerstaecker, 1856)
