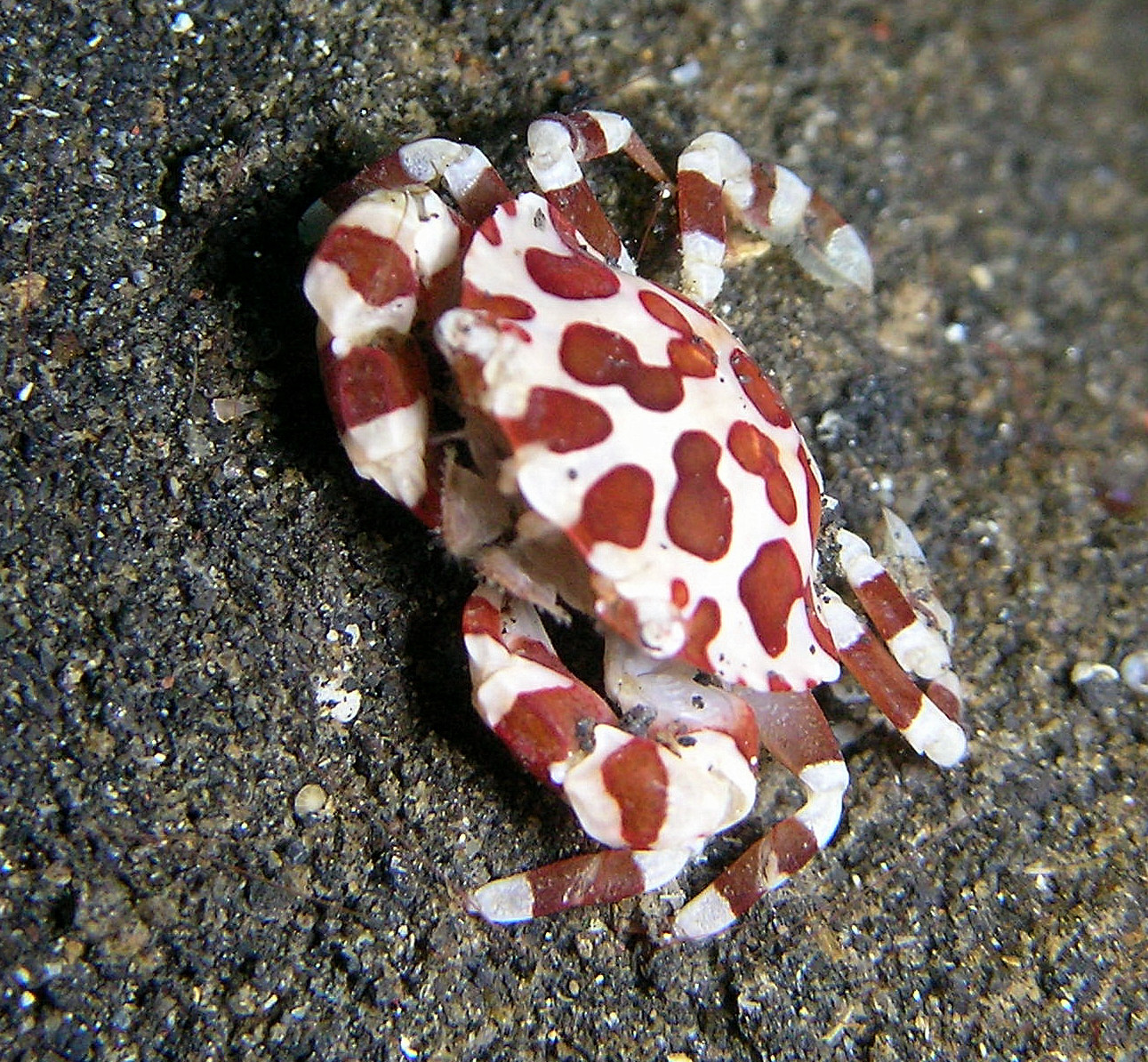
- Lissocarcinus orbicularis

Scientific classification
- Domain: Eukaryota
- Kingdom: Animalia
- Phylum: Arthropoda
- Class: Malacostraca
- Order: Decapoda
- Suborder: Pleocyemata
- Infraorder: Brachyura
- Family: Portunidae
- Subfamily: Caphyrinae
- Genus: Lissocarcinus; Adams & White, 1848

Species
- See text

= Lissocarcinus =

Genus of crabs

Lissocarcinus is a genus of crabs containing the following nine species :

- Lissocarcinus arkati Kemp, 1923
- Lissocarcinus boholensis Semper, 1880
- Lissocarcinus echinodisci Derijard, 1968
- Lissocarcinus elegans Boone, 1934
- Lissocarcinus holothuricola (Streets, 1877)
- Lissocarcinus laevis Miers, 1886
- Lissocarcinus orbicularis Dana, 1852
- Lissocarcinus ornatus Chopra, 1931
- Lissocarcinus polybioides Adams & White, 1849
