= Caphyra =

Scientific classification
- Kingdom: Animalia
- Phylum: Arthropoda
- Class: Malacostraca
- Order: Decapoda
- Suborder: Pleocyemata
- Infraorder: Brachyura
- Family: Portunidae
- Subfamily: Thalamitinae
- Genus: Caphyra; Guérin, 1832

Genus of crustaceans

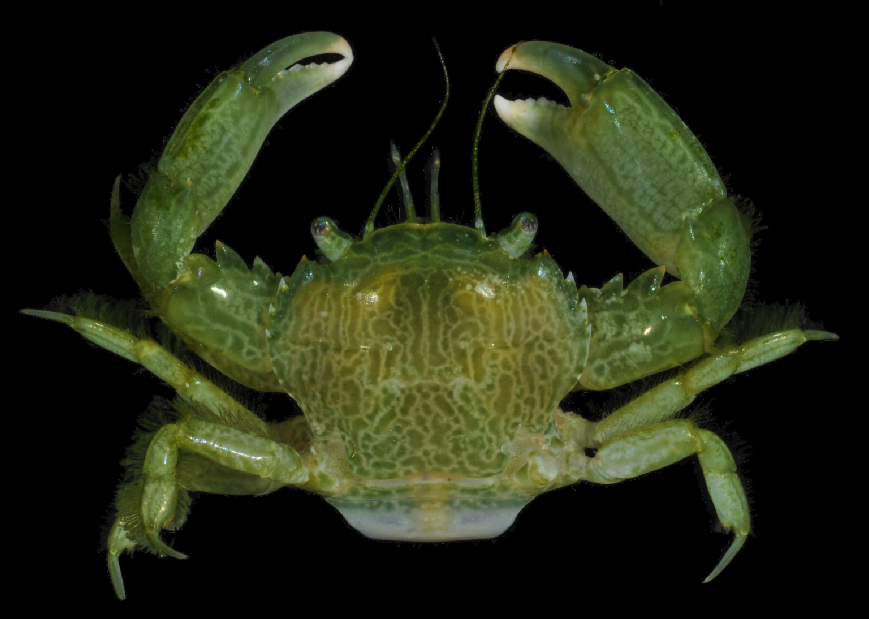

Caphyra is a genus of marine crabs.

The following species are assigned to this genus:

- Caphyra acheronae Takeda & Webber, 2006
- Caphyra alata Richters, 1880
- Caphyra alcyoniophila Monod, 1928
- Caphyra bedoti (Zehntner, 1894)
- Caphyra curtipes Stephenson & Rees, 1968
- Caphyra fulva Stephenson & Campbell, 1960
- Caphyra hemisphaerica Rathbun, 1911
- Caphyra holocarinata Stephenson & Rees, 1968
- Caphyra loevis (A. Milne-Edwards, 1869)
- Caphyra minabensis Sakai, 1983
- Caphyra polita (Heller, 1860)
- Caphyra rotundifrons (A. Milne-Edwards, 1869)
- Caphyra rouxii Guérin, 1832
- Caphyra tricostata Richters, 1880
- Caphyra tridens Richters, 1880
- Caphyra unidentata Lenz, 1910
- Caphyra yookadai Sakai, 1933
