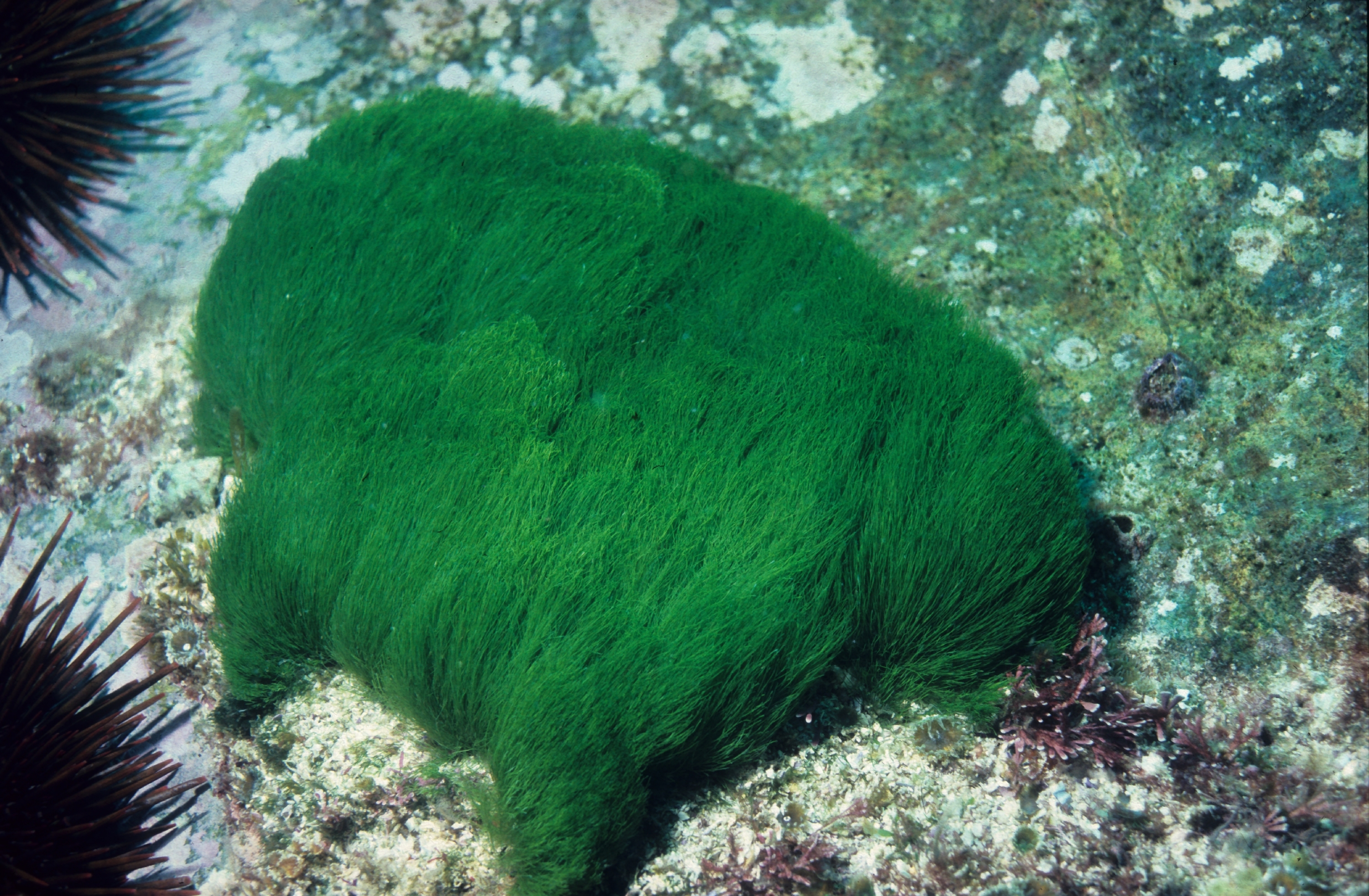
- Turtle weed, Chlorodesmis fastigiata, at 6 meters depth

Scientific classification
- Domain: Eukaryota
- Clade: Archaeplastida
- Clade: Viridiplantae
- Division: Chlorophyta
- Class: Ulvophyceae
- Order: Bryopsidales
- Family: Udoteaceae
- Genus: Chlorodesmis; Harvey & Bailey, 1841

Type species
- Chlorodesmis comosa

Species
- Chlorodesmis baculifera; Chlorodesmis caespitosa; Chlorodesmis dotyi; Chlorodesmis fastigiata; Chlorodesmis haterumana; Chlorodesmis hildebrandtii; Chlorodesmis major; Chlorodesmis mexicana; Chlorodesmis papenfussii; Chlorodesmis sinensis

= Chlorodesmis =

Genus of algae

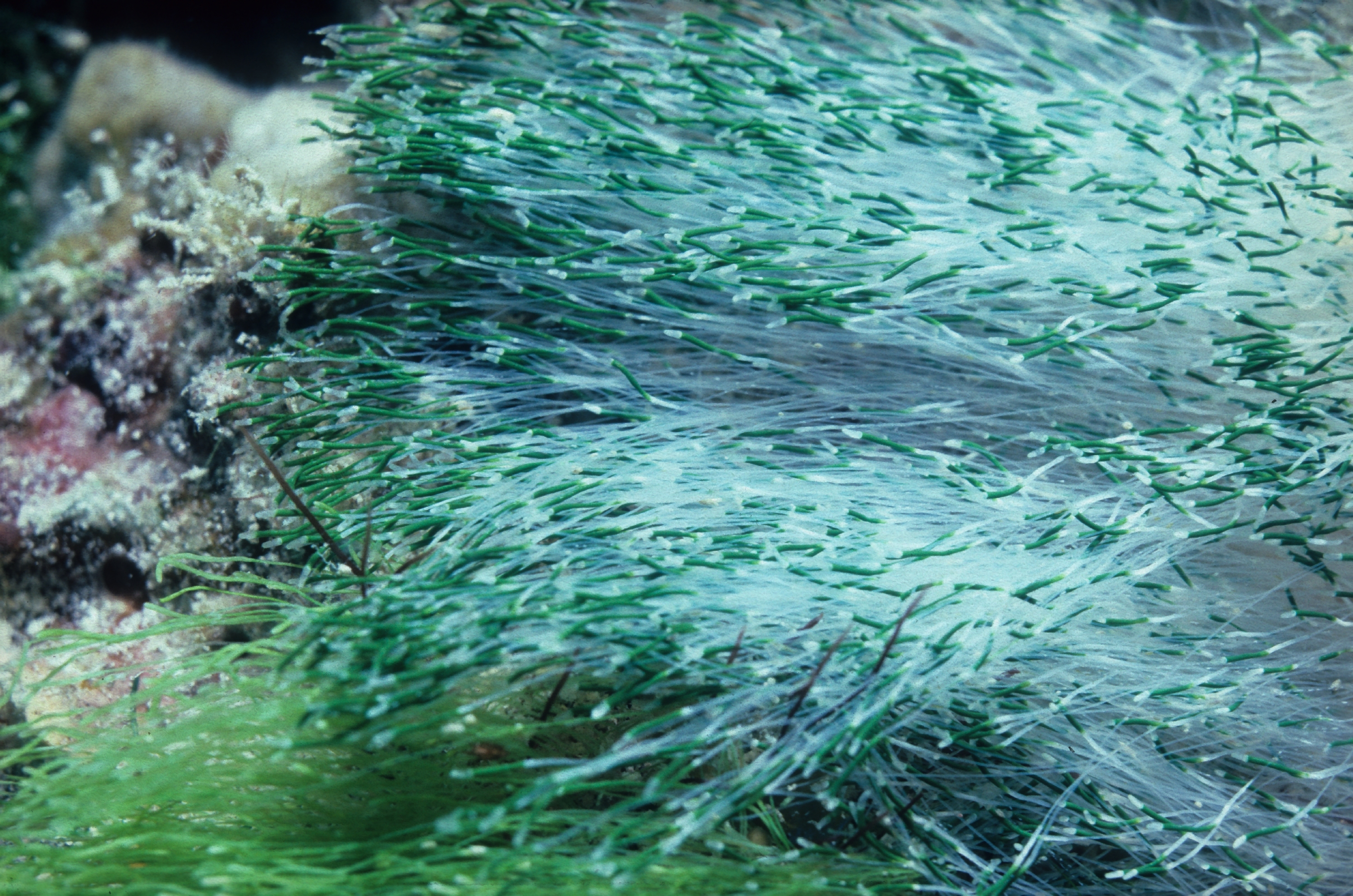
File:Turtle weed, Chlorodesmis fastigiata, with zooidangia

Chlorodesmis is a genus of green algae in the family Udoteaceae. Algae in this genus produce the toxic diterpene chlorodesmin to defend themselves against generalist herbivores This toxin also kills certain corals that touch the alga. Certain fish like the green coral goby that live in the corals eat the alga to enhance their own toxicity. Other coral dwelling fish like Paragobiodon echinocephalus actively trim the alga even though they don't eat it.
