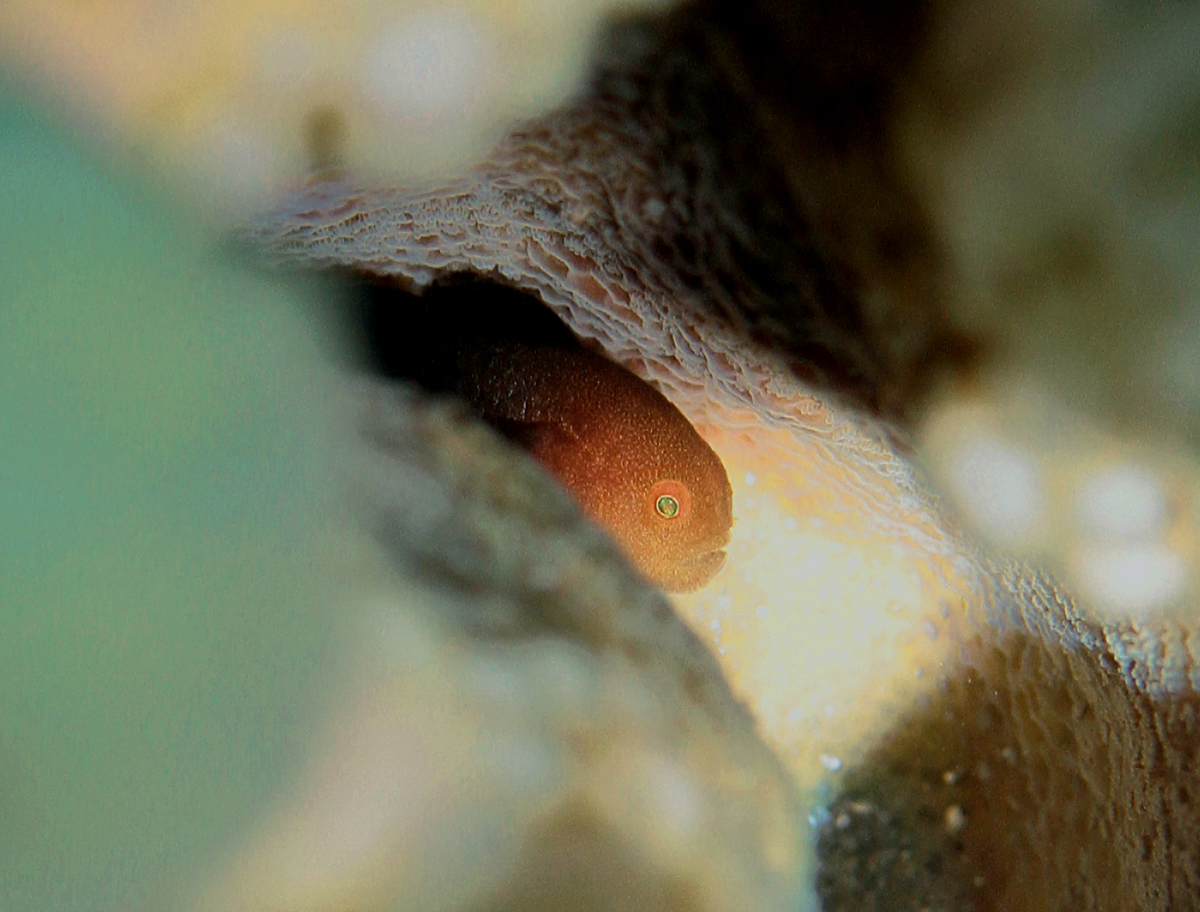
- Warthead goby (Paragobiodon modestus) hiding in a Pocillopora coral.

Scientific classification
- Kingdom: Animalia
- Phylum: Chordata
- Class: Actinopterygii
- Order: Gobiiformes
- Family: Gobiidae
- Genus: Paragobiodon; Bleeker, 1873

Type species
- Gobius echinocephalus Rüppell, 1830

Synonyms
- Ruppellia Swainson, 1839

= Paragobiodon =

Genus of fishes

Paragobiodon is a genus of gobies native to reef habitats of the Indian Ocean and the western Pacific Ocean.

== Species ==
There are currently five recognized species in this genus:

- Paragobiodon echinocephalus (Rüppell, 1830) (Redhead goby)
- Paragobiodon lacunicolus (Kendall & Goldsborough, 1911) (Blackfin coral goby)
- Paragobiodon melanosomus (Bleeker, 1853) (Dark coral goby)
- Paragobiodon modestus (Regan, 1908) (Warthead goby)
- Paragobiodon xanthosoma (Bleeker, 1853) (Emerald coral goby)

== Gallery ==
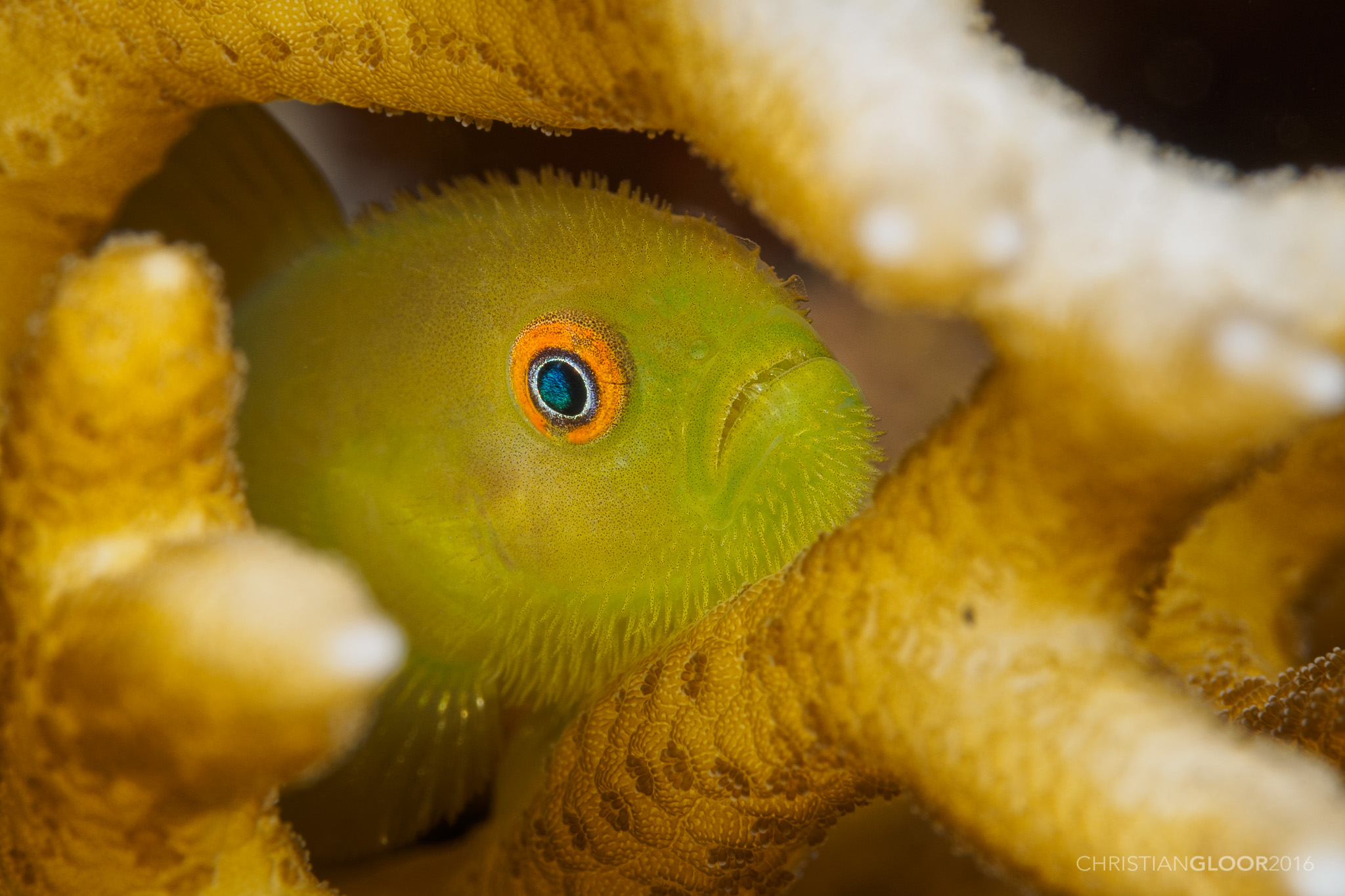
Paragobiodon xanthosoma at Wakatobi National Park

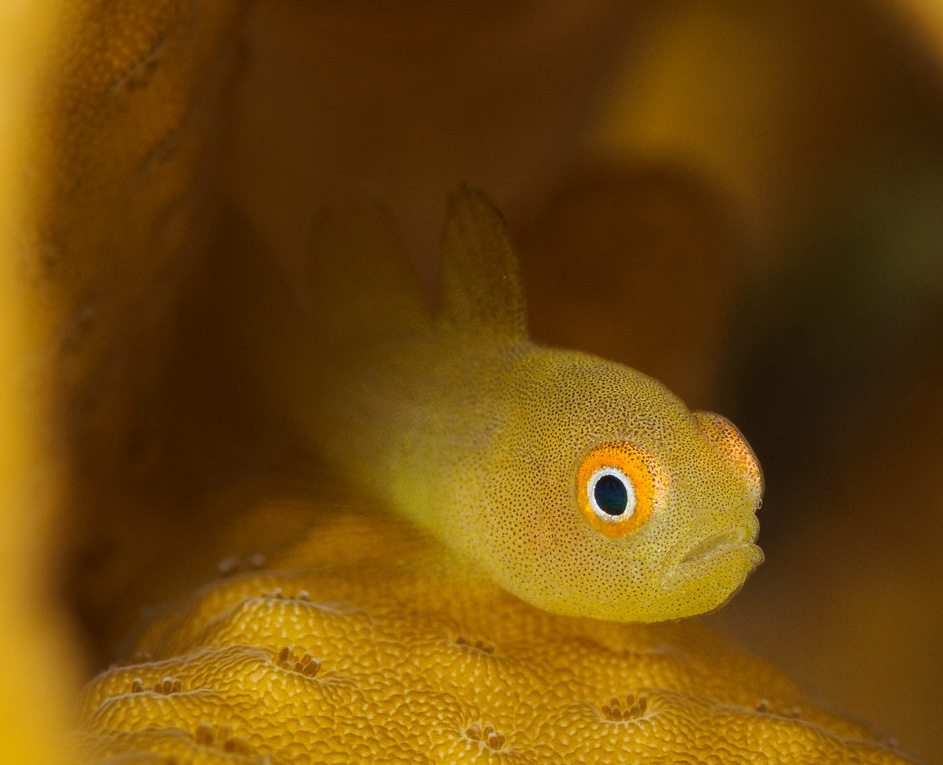
Paragobiodon xanthosoma at North Sulawesi

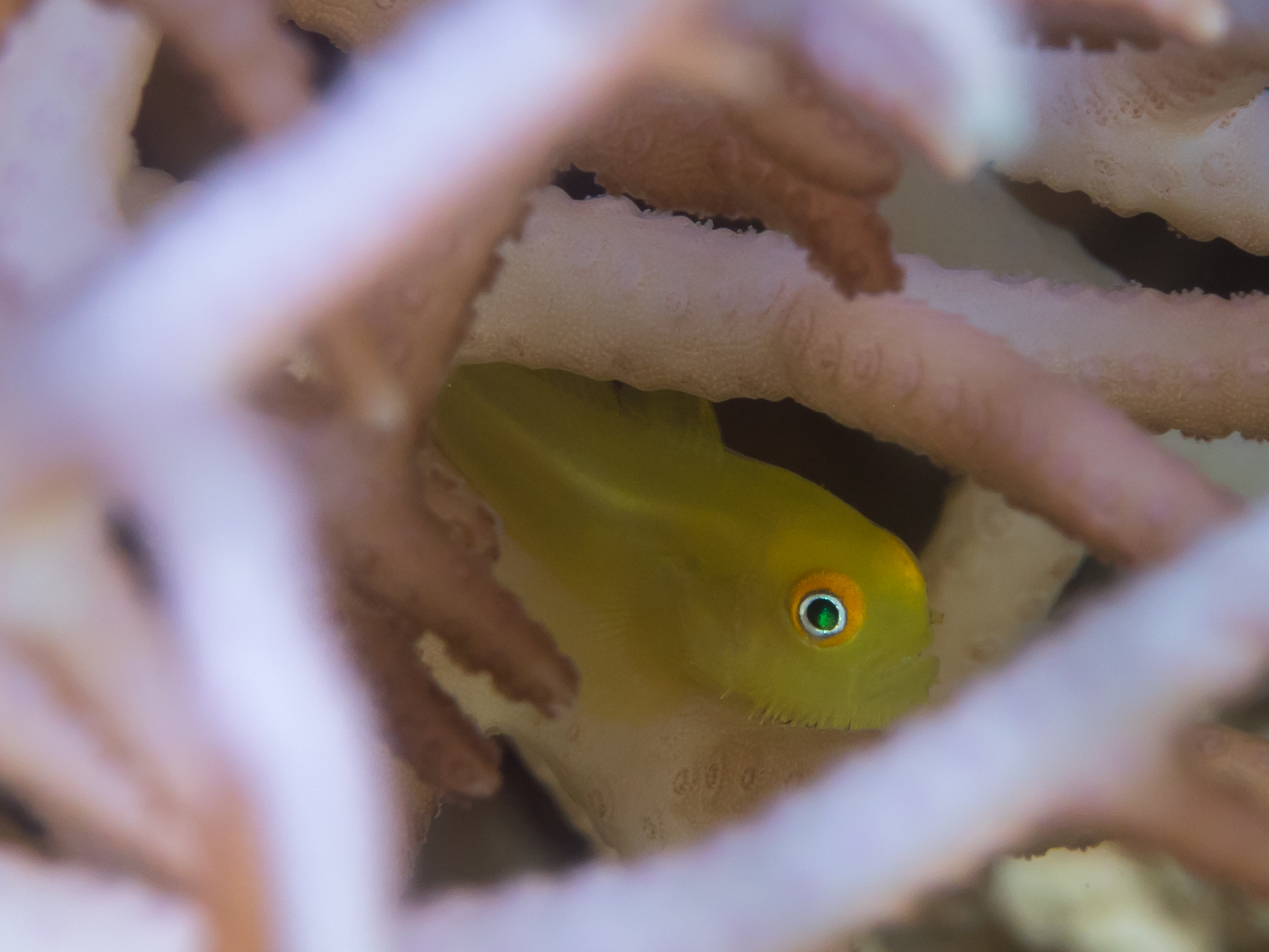
Paragobiodon xanthosoma at Rao west of Morotai Indonesia
