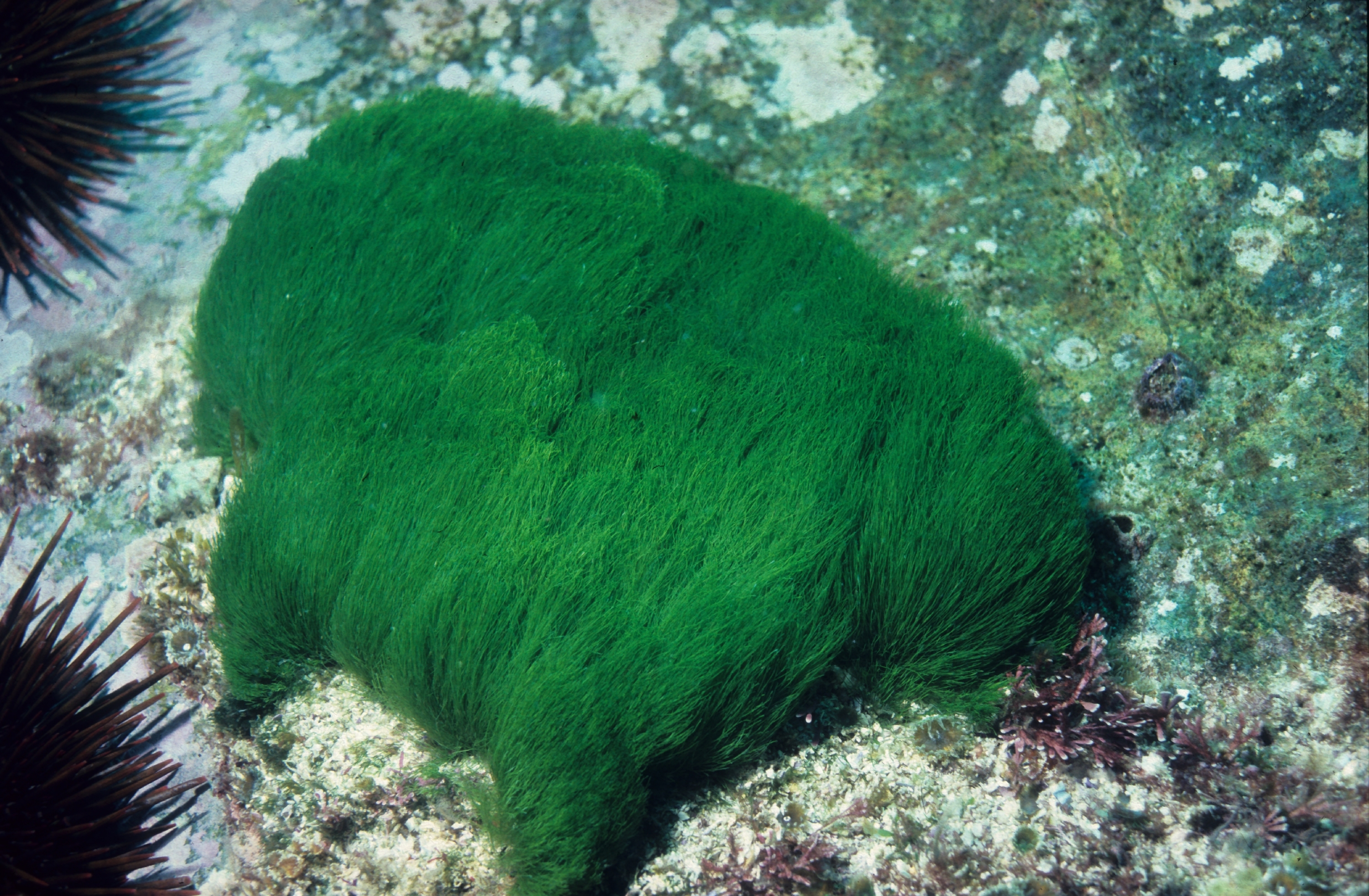

Scientific classification
- Kingdom: Plantae
- Division: Chlorophyta
- Class: Ulvophyceae
- Order: Bryopsidales
- Family: Udoteaceae
- Genus: Chlorodesmis
- Species: C. fastigiata

Binomial name
- Chlorodesmis fastigiata (C.Ag.) Ducker

= Chlorodesmis fastigiata =

Species of algae

Chlorodesmis fastigiata, sometimes called turtle weed, is a species of algae belonging to the family Udoteaceae.

== Taxonomy ==
C. fastigiata was originally described as Vaucheria fastigiata by Carl Adolph Agardh in 1824. It was relocated to the genus Chlorodesmis in 1969 by Sophie Charlotte Ducker. It also has two heterotypic synonyms: Chlorodesmis comosa Harvey & Bailey 1851 and Avrainvillea comosa (Harvey & Bailey) G.Murray & Boodle 1889.

== Distribution ==
C. fastigiata grows in marine waters. The species is found primarily in the Indian Ocean and the western central Pacific Ocean.

== Ecology ==
C. fastigiata is the sole food source for Caphyra rotundifrons, which also uses it as shelter.
