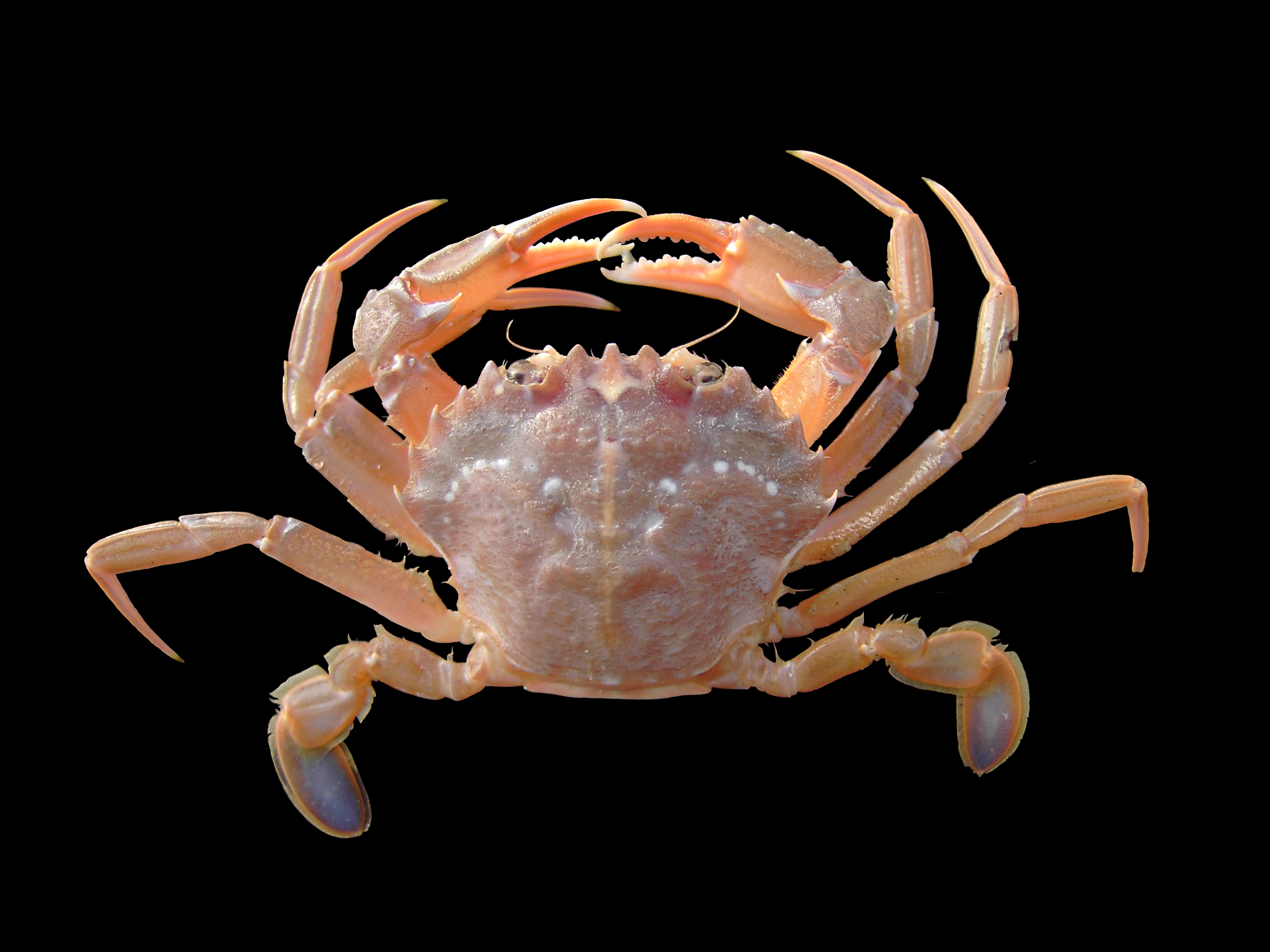
- Liocarcinus depurator

Scientific classification
- Kingdom: Animalia
- Phylum: Arthropoda
- Clade: Pancrustacea
- Class: Malacostraca
- Order: Decapoda
- Suborder: Pleocyemata
- Infraorder: Brachyura
- Superfamily: Portunoidea
- Family: Portunidae; Rafinesque, 1815

Subfamilies
- Achelouinae Spiridonov, 2020 Carupinae Paul'son, 1875; Coelocarcininae Števćić, 1991 Lupocyclinae Alcock, 1899; Necronectinae Glaessner, 1928 Podophthalminae Dana, 1851; Portuninae Rafinesque, 1815 Thalamitinae Paul'son, 1875

= Portunidae =

Family of crabs

Portunidae is a family of crabs which contains the swimming crabs. Its members include well-known shoreline crabs such as the blue crab (Callinectes sapidus) and velvet crab (Necora puber).

== Description ==
Portunid crabs are characterised by the flattening of the fifth pair of legs into broad paddles, which are used for swimming. This ability, together with their strong, sharp claws, allows many species to be fast and aggressive predators.

== Taxonomy ==
Swimming crabs reach their greatest species diversity in the Pacific and Indian Oceans. Portunidae consists of the following subfamilies and genera: (Note: Extinct genera are marked with an obelisk.)

Achelouinae Spiridonov, 2020

- Achelous De Haan, 1833

Caphyrinae Guérin, 1832

- Caphyra Guérin, 1832
- Coelocarcinus Edmondson, 1930
- Lissocarcinus Adams & White, 1849
- †Mioxaiva Müller, 1978

Carupinae Paulson, 1875

- Carupa Dana, 1851
- Catoptrus A. Milne-Edwards, 1870
- †Euronectes Karasawa, Schweitzer & Feldmann, 2008
- Kume Naruse & Ng, 2012
- Laleonectes Manning & Chace, 1990
- Libystes A. Milne-Edwards, 1867
- Pele Ng, 2011
- †Rakosia Müller, 1984
- Richerellus Crosnier, 2003

Coelocarcininae Števćić, 1991

- Coelocarcinus Edmondson, 1930

Lupocyclinae Alcock, 1899

- Lupocycloporus Alcock, 1899
- Lupocyclus Adams & White, 1849

Necronectinae Glaessner, 1928

- †Necronectes A. Milne-Edwards, 1881
- Scylla De Haan, 1833

Podophthalminae Dana, 1851

- Euphylax Stimpson, 1860
- †Paraeuphylax Varela & Schweitzer, 2011
- †Phenophthalmus Feldmann, Schweitzer & Encinas, 2010
- Podophthalmus Lamarck, 1801
- †Psygmophthalmus Schweitzer, Iturralde-Vinent, Hetler & Velez-Juarbe, 2006
- †Sandomingia Rathbun, 1919
- †Saratunus Collins, Lee & Noad, 2003
- †Viaophthalmus Karasawa, Schweitzer & Feldmann, 2008
- Vojmirophthalmus Števčić, 2011

Portuninae Rafinesque, 1815

- †Acanthoportunus Schweitzer & Feldmann, 2002
- Alionectes Koch, Spiridonov & Ďuriš, 2022
- Allomonomia Koch, Spiridonov & Ďuriš, 2022
- †Archaeoportunus Artal, Ossó & Domínguez, 2021
- Arenaeus Dana, 1851
- Atoportunus Ng & Takeda, 2003
- Callinectes Stimpson, 1860
- Carupella Lenz in Lenz & Strunck, 1914
- Cavoportunus Nguyen & Ng, 2010
- †Colneptunus Lőrenthey in Lőrenthey & Beurlen, 1929
- Cycloachelous Ward, 1942
- Eodemus Koch, Spiridonov & Ďuriš, 2022
- Incultus Koch, Spiridonov & Ďuriš, 2022
- Monomia Gistel, 1848
- †Persianus Garassino, Pasini, Mirzaie Attabadi & Nyborg in Garassino, Pasini, Mirzaie Ataabadi, Hadi, Parsazad, Nyborg & Vega, 2024
- Portunus Weber, 1795
- †Rathbunites Schweitzer, Dworschak & Martin, 2011
- Sanquerus Manning, 1989
- Trionectes Koch, Spiridonov & Ďuriš, 2022
- Xiphonectes A. Milne-Edwards, 1873

Thalamitinae Paulson, 1875

- Caphyra Guérin, 1832
- Charybdis De Haan, 1833
- Cronius Stimpson, 1860
- †Eocharybdis Beschin, Busulini, De Angeli & Tessier, 2002
- Gonioinfradens Leene, 1938
- Goniosupradens Davie, 2002
- †Lessinithalamita De Angeli & Ceccon, 2015
- Lissocarcinus Adams & White, 1849
- †Mioxaiva Müller, 1979
- Thalamita Latreille, 1829
- Thalamitoides A. Milne-Edwards, 1869
- Zygita Evans, 2018

incertae sedis

- †Neptocarcinus Lörenthey, 1897
- †Pseudoachelous Portell & Collins, 2004
