= Blue crab =

Blue crab may refer to:

- Blue Crab 11, an American sailboat design
- Callinectes sapidus – Chesapeake or Atlantic blue crab of the West Atlantic, introduced elsewhere
- Cardisoma guanhumi – blue land crab of the West Atlantic
- Tuerkayana celeste – Christmas Island blue crab
- Paralithodes platypus – blue king crab of the North Pacific
- Portunus pelagicus – blue swimmer crab of Australia and Southwest Pacific
- Portunus segnis - a Western Indian Ocean species, was recently recorded in Tunisian waters, where it is invasive
- Portunus trituberculatus – Japanese blue crab of the Northwest Pacific
