= Wanli Crab =

Wanli Crab is a brand name for the wild sea-crab caught by the crab-fishermen from the Wanli District of the New Taipei City in Taiwan. As more than 80% of these crab were caught by Wanli fishermen, the New Taipei City Government decided to establish a Wanli Crab brand name in 2012 to boost the market value of the branded crab.

Once caught, the Wanli Crab are immediately tied up using a unique neon-green nylon cord. This unique colored cord thus becomes the identification to distinguish Wanli Crab from other crab caught by non-Wanli fishermen.

== Species ==
The Wanli Crab brand includes three species: the flower crab (Charybdis feriatus), the three-spot crab (Portunus sanguinolentus, red-spotted swimming crab), and ridged swimming crab (Charybdis natator).

== Fisheries ==
Most of the Wanli Crab comes from the Northwest Fishery located 35 nautical miles from the Fugui Cape in New Taipei City. Besides unloading the crab caught at nearby fishing ports in Wanli and Shimen, Wanli Crab fishermen will also distribute the crab via ports in Taichung and Penghu when they go crabbing down-south during the spring emerging to summer seasons. Approximately 550 to 600 tons of Wanli Crab are caught each year. Wanli Crab accounts for more than 80% of the annual production of sea-crab in Taiwan.

== Crabbing methods ==
Wanli Crab fishermen use fishy lures boxed inside a round-shaped crabbing cage to lure the crab to come inside via one of the three openings in the cage. Fishermen dropped up to 360 cages per fishing rope to seabeds and let them sit for 16 to 20 hours before retrieving. Once caught, each crab will be tied up with the symbolic neon-green nylon cord before putting them back to the water tank inside the bottom of the crabbing boat.

Starting in April 2014, the government in Taiwan mandated that the crab caught must be larger than 6 to 8 cm by measuring their back-shells. Also all egg-bearing crab caught must be released immediately between August 16 and November 15. Violators can be fined up to 150,000 New Taiwan Dollars. In 2022 the size regulations were modified to 7 to 9 cm and the egg-bearing protection period was lengthened to between August 1 and December 31. In 2023 a new regulations was added that all crab caught, displayed, possessed, and sold must have their abdominal flaps intact between August 1 and December 31.
