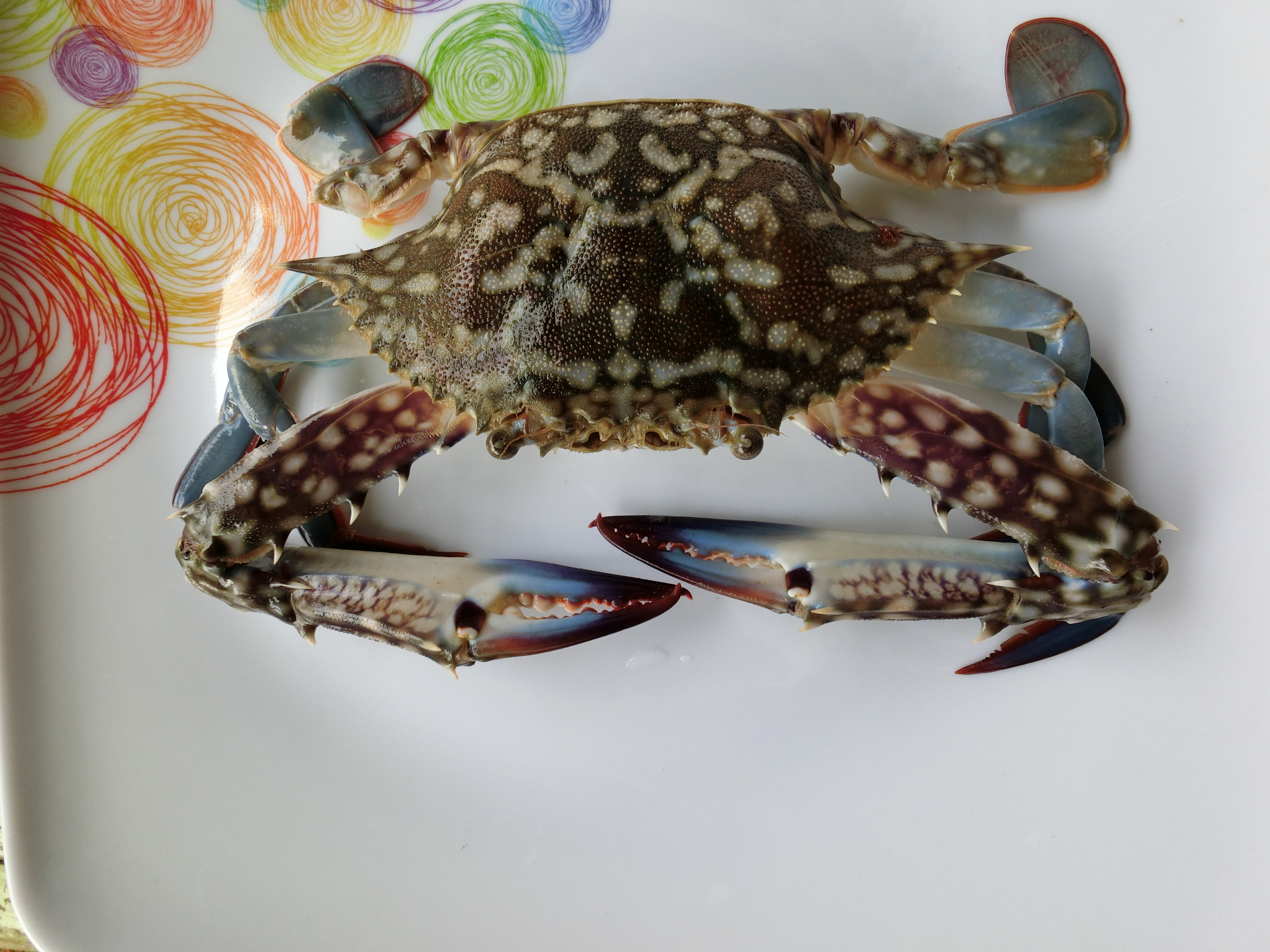

Scientific classification
- Kingdom: Animalia
- Phylum: Arthropoda
- Class: Malacostraca
- Order: Decapoda
- Suborder: Pleocyemata
- Infraorder: Brachyura
- Family: Portunidae
- Genus: Portunus
- Species: P. armatus

Binomial name
- Portunus armatus (A. Milne-Edwards, 1861)

= Portunus armatus =

Species of crustacean

Portunus armatus (also known as Neptunus armatus) is a species of crustacean, a swimming crab in the family Portunidae found in Australia and eastwards to New Caledonia. Common names include blue swimmer crabs, Blue manna, Blueys, and Jennies (for females). The species was originally considered as a geographic variation of Portunus pelagicus, however in 2010 the Portunus pelagicus species was reviewed using DNA, as well as physical characteristics including measurements and four species recognised: Portunus pelagicus, Portunus armatus, Portunus reticulatis and Portunus segnis. The range of Portunus armatus overlaps with Portunus pelagicus in the Northern Territory of Australia.

Portunus armatus is a commercially and recreationally important fishing crab. Although it is resilient to overfishing, collapse of populations have occurred in some areas where there has been adverse environmental conditions and heavy fishing.

These crabs inhabit waters from 50 m depth through to the intertidal zone, moving from shallower to deeper water in winter. Individuals in estuaries will move to the ocean in response to fresh water from winter rains. They prefer areas with flat muddy or sandy bottoms with seagrass or algae. They reach maturity in one year, and live to an age of 2-3 years. Maximum size across the carapace is around 200mm to 250mm, with up to 800mm maximum claw span.

The color is variable, but the carapace of males is generally dark blue-green with spots overall and bands at the front, whereas females are similarly pattered but brownish and with the tips of the claws deep brownish red. Behind the eye on each side of the carapace, is a total of 9 teeth or spines, including one long spine at the side. The last limb ends in a flat paddle.

Diet is mostly small fish and other crustaceans, molluscs, worms, and less so algae and seagrass.
