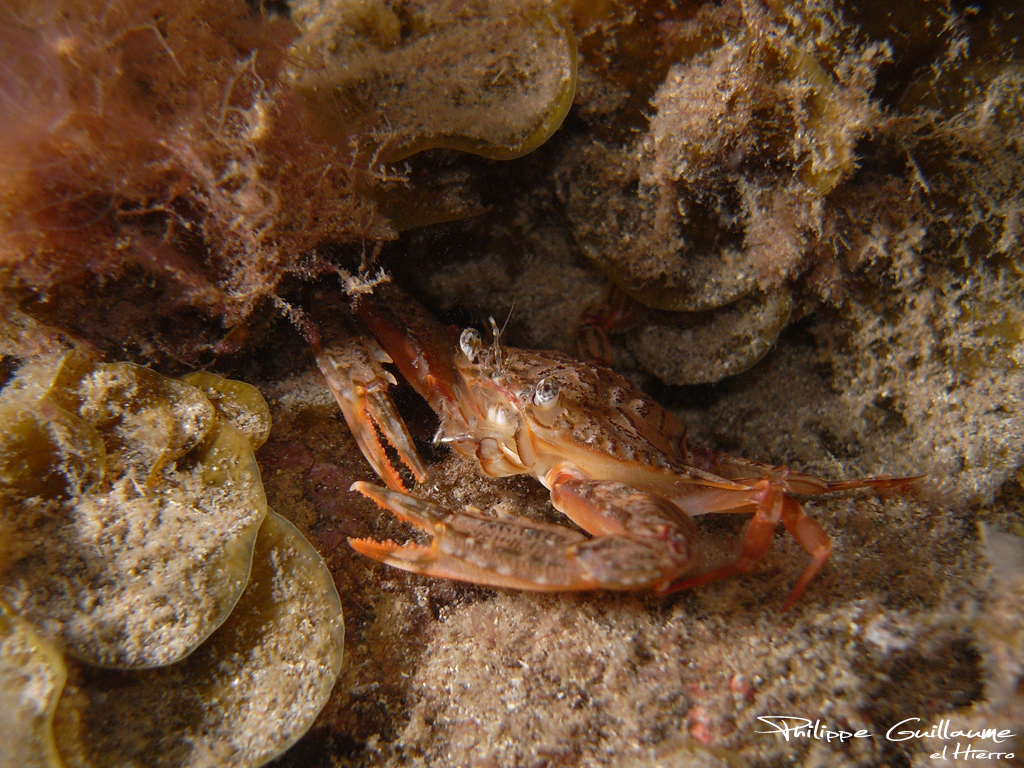
- Portunus hastatus

Scientific classification
- Kingdom: Animalia
- Phylum: Arthropoda
- Class: Malacostraca
- Order: Decapoda
- Suborder: Pleocyemata
- Infraorder: Brachyura
- Family: Portunidae
- Subfamily: Portuninae
- Genus: Portunus; Weber, 1795

Type species
- Cancer pelagicus Linnaeus, 1758

Synonyms
- Lupa Leach, 1814; Lupea Leach, 1814; Neptunus De Haan, 1833

= Portunus =

Portunus Temporal range: Paleogene - Recent

Genus of crabs

Portunus is a genus of crabs which includes several important species for fisheries, such as the blue swimming crab and the Gazami crab. Other species, such as the three-spotted crab are caught as bycatch.

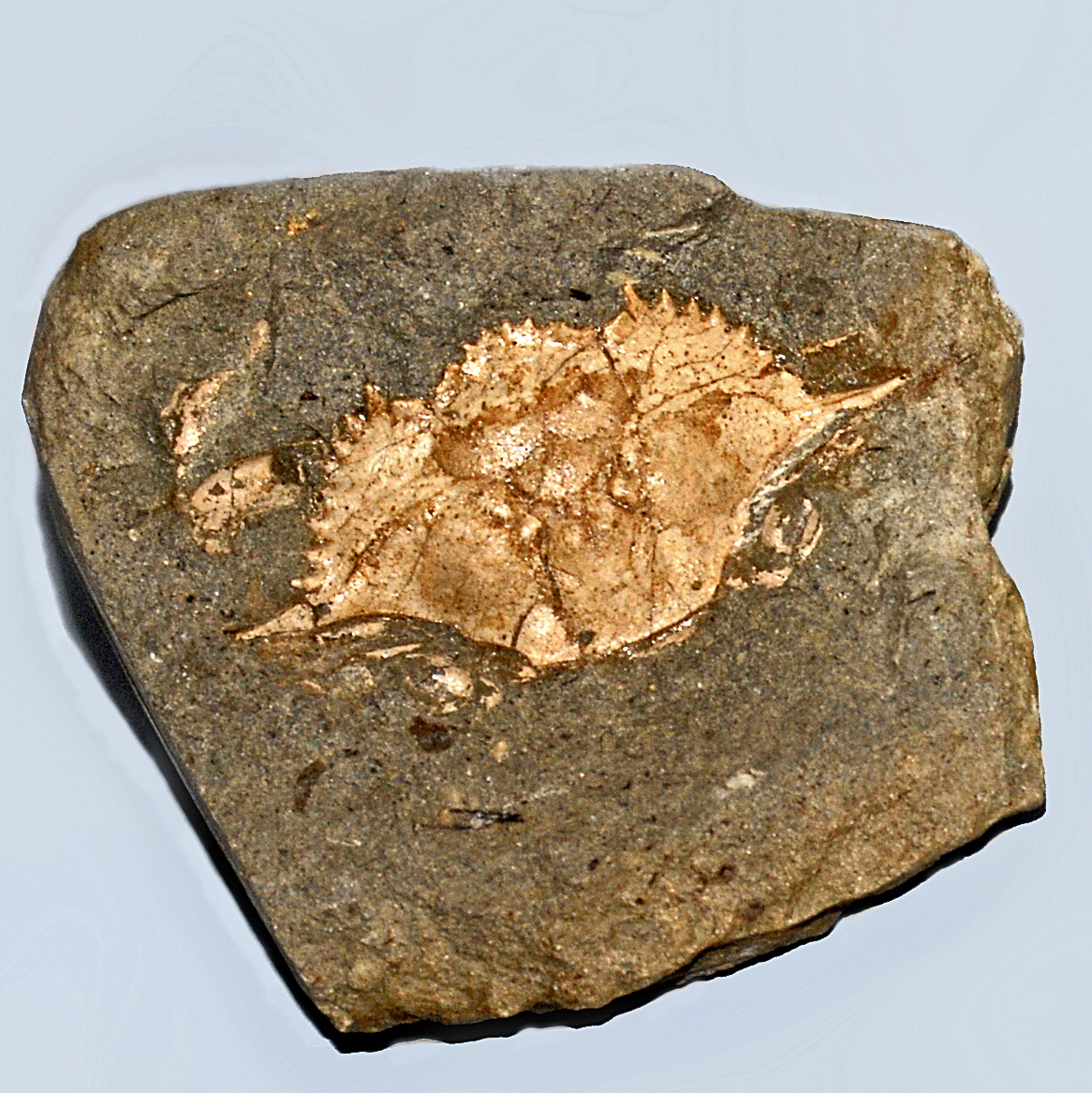
Fossil of Portunus convexus

The genus Portunus contains 13 extant species and another 26 species known only from fossils. Fossils of crabs within this genus can be found in sediment of Europe, the United States, Mexico, Venezuela, Brazil and Australia from Paleogene to recent (age range: 48.6 to 0.0 million years ago).

== Species ==
The following species are recognised in the genus Portunus:

- †Portunus alphonsei Karasawa, Schweitzer & Feldmann, 2008
- †Portunus arcuatus (A. Milne-Edwards, 1860)
- Portunus armatus (A. Milne-Edwards, 1861)
- †Portunus atecuicitli Vega, Feldmann, Villalobos-Hiriart & Gío-Argíez, 1999
- †Portunus bericensis De Angeli & Bellin, 2024
- †Portunus brouweri Van Straelen, 1924
- †Portunus catalaunicus (Vía, 1941)
- Portunus convexus De Haan, 1835
- †Portunus delgadoi (Fontannes, 1884)
- †Portunus edwardsi Sismonda, 1861
- †Portunus ferreirai (Brito, 1971)
- †Portunus gabbi Rathbun, 1919
- †Portunus gallicus (A. Milne-Edwards in de Bouillé, 1873)
- †Portunus haitensis Rathbun, 1923
- Portunus hawaiiensis Stephenson, 1968
- †Portunus incertus (A. Milne-Edwards, 1860)
- †Portunus kisslingi Studer, 1892
- †Portunus kochii (Bittner, 1893)
- †Portunus krambergeri (Bittner, 1893)
- †Portunus larteti (A. Milne-Edwards, 1860)
- †Portunus levigatus Rathbun, 1945
- Portunus madagascariensis (Hoffmann, 1874)
- †Portunus miocaenicus Müller, 1984
- Portunus mokyevskii Zarenkov, 1970
- †Portunus monspeliensis (A. Milne-Edwards, 1860)
- †Portunus muelleri Collins, 2014
- †Portunus neogenicus Müller, 1979
- †Portunus oblongus Rathbun, 1920
- †Portunus obtusus (A. Milne-Edwards, 1860)
- †Portunus obvallatus Morris & Collins, 1991
- †Portunus pankowskiorum Schweitzer & Feldmann, 2015
- Portunus pelagicus (Linnaeus, 1758)
- †Portunus pirabaensis Martins-Neto, 2001
- Portunus pirabensis (Brito, 1971)
- †Portunus planargiaensis Pasini & Garassino, 2024
- Portunus pubescens (Dana, 1852)
- †Portunus radobojanus (Bittner, 1884)
- †Portunus regulensis (Van Straelen, 1939)
- Portunus reticulatus (Herbst, 1799)
- †Portunus ristorii Karasawa, Schweitzer & Feldmann, 2008
- Portunus rufiarcus Davie, 1987
- Portunus sanguinolentus (Herbst, 1783)
- †Portunus sanshianus Hu, 1984
- Portunus sayi (Gibbes, 1850)
- Portunus segnis (Forskål, 1775)
- †Portunus sijuensis (Satsangi & Parida, 1980)
- †Portunus stenaspis (Bittner, 1884)
- †Portunus straeleni (Vía, 1948)
- †Portunus suessii (Bittner, 1875)
- †Portunus tenuis Rathbun, 1919
- †Portunus thalae Macarovici, 1970
- †Portunus tongfai Hu, 1981
- Portunus trituberculatus (Miers, 1876)
- †Portunus vectensis (Carter, 1898)
- †Portunus viai Secrétan in Philippe & Secrétan, 1971
- †Portunus vicentinus (A. Milne-Edwards, 1860)
- †Portunus withersi (Glaessner, 1933)
- †Portunus woodwardi Morris & Collins, 1991
- †Portunus wynneanus (Stoliczka, 1871)
- †Portunus yaucoensis Schweitzer, Iturralde-Vinent, Hetler & Velez-Juarbe, 2006
