= Wanli District, New Taipei =

District in Taiwan

Wanli 萬里區 Banri
- District
- Wanli District
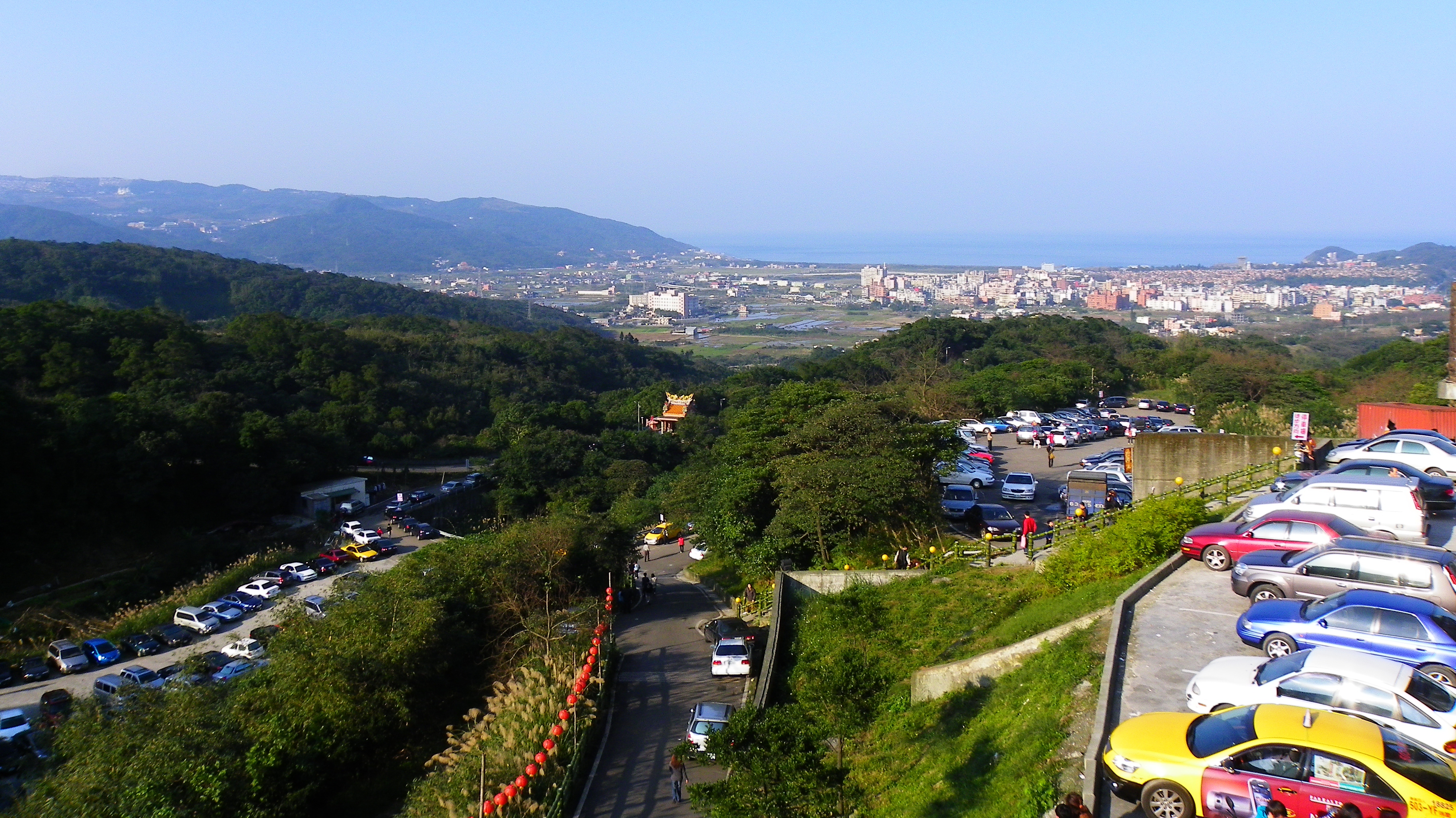

- Location of Wanli in New Taipei City
- Coordinates: 25°10′03″N 121°38′22″E
- Country: Republic of China (Taiwan)
- Region: Northern Taiwan
- Special municipality: New Taipei City

Area
  - Total: 63.38 km^{2} (24.47 sq mi)

Population (March 2023)
  - Total: 21,012
- Time zone: UTC+8 (CST)
- Postal code: 207
- Area code: 02
- Website: www.wanli.ntpc.gov.tw (in Chinese)

Wanli District
- Traditional Chinese: 萬里區
Transcriptions
Standard Mandarin
- Hanyu Pinyin: Wànlǐ Qū
- Bopomofo: ㄨㄢˋ ㄌㄧˇ ㄑㄩ
- Tongyong Pinyin: Wànlǐ Cyu
Hakka
- Romanization: Van-lî Khî
Southern Min
- Hokkien POJ: Bān-lí-khu

Wanli District (Chinese: 萬里區; pinyin: Wànlǐ Qū), known in Basay as Masu, is a rural district on the rocky seacoast in northeastern New Taipei City in northern Taiwan. Wanli is a popular tourist destination and the site of the Cape Yehliu Miocene Formation which features distinctive hoodoo outcrops. The "Queen's Head" outcrop is a Taiwanese icon and serves as an informal trademark for the township. Kataw in the adjacent Jinshan District features the Wanli Taiwanese hot springs area, which is connected with the Jinshan Hot Springs (金山溫泉).

== History ==
The village of Masu (瑪鋉) was inhabited by Taiwanese aborigines before the era of European colonization. The area first came under the control of the Spanish, who were then ousted by the Dutch. The area began to develop when Hoklo people came to set up fishing operations.

The Ming dynasty loyalist Koxinga landed his troops at Wanli in 1661 to expel the Dutch from their northern strongholds while their principal fortress in Tainan was under siege.

In 1683, following the Qing dynasty conquest of Taiwan, the area was incorporated into Zhuluo County. In 1875, it was a member of Kimpauli (金包里堡), Kelung Sub-Subprefecture (基隆支廳).

In 1891, during Qing dynasty rule, the village was destroyed by military force as punishment for engaging in raids against Chinese camphor men and soldiers near Tokoham (modern-day Daxi).

When the Japanese took control of the island in 1895, Wanli (called Banri by the Japanese) became part of Kīrun Subprefecture, Taihoku Ken. In 1901, a reorganisation split Taihoku Ken up into smaller prefectures, with Banri becoming part of Kinpori (Kimpauli) Subprefecture, Kīrun Prefecture (基隆廳). In 1909, Kīrun Prefecture was amalgamated into the larger Taihoku Prefecture (臺北廳). This situation remained in place until the Republic of China took over administration of Taiwan at the end of World War II: Taihoku Prefecture became Taipei County, and Banri Village became Wanli Township.

== Geography ==
Wanli is bordered to the northwest by Jinshan District, New Taipei, to the northeast by the Pacific Ocean, to the east by the Anle and Qidu Districts of Keelung. To the south is a short border with Xizhi District of New Taipei City, and to the southwest is Taipei City's Shilin District. The topography of the area is marked by the rocky Pacific coastline and the forested, mountainous interior.

== Administration ==
Since 25 December 2010, Wanli has been administered as a district of New Taipei City. Prior to this date, Wanli was a township under Taipei County. Wanli is further subdivided into ten villages: Wanli (萬里里), Beiji (北基里), Guihou (龜吼里), Yehliu (野柳里), Dapeng (大鵬里), Huangtan (磺潭里), Shuangxing (雙興里), Xidi (溪底里), Kanjiao (崁腳里), and Zhongfu (中幅里). Prior to the 2010 reorganization, Wanli elected its own mayor, but now as a district of New Taipei City the District Chief is appointed by the mayor of New Taipei City.

== Economy ==
The crabbing industry is important, and in 2012 the government established the Wanli Crab brand name to boost sales.

== Infrastructure ==
- Kuosheng Nuclear Power Plant

== Tourist attractions ==
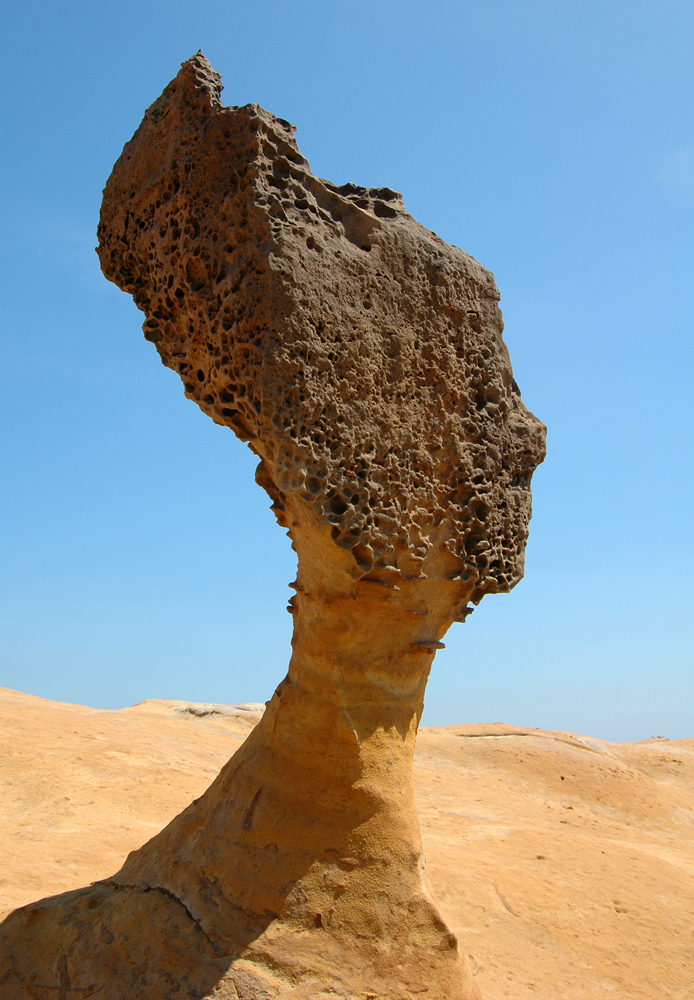
The Queen's Head (女王頭)

- Yehliu
- Yehliu Ocean World
- Feicui Bay (翡翠灣)
- Wanli UFO village, a large collection of prefabricated Futuro and Venturo homes

== Notable natives ==
- Huang Yee-ling, singer
- Lai Ching-te, President of the Republic of China

== See also ==
- New Taipei
