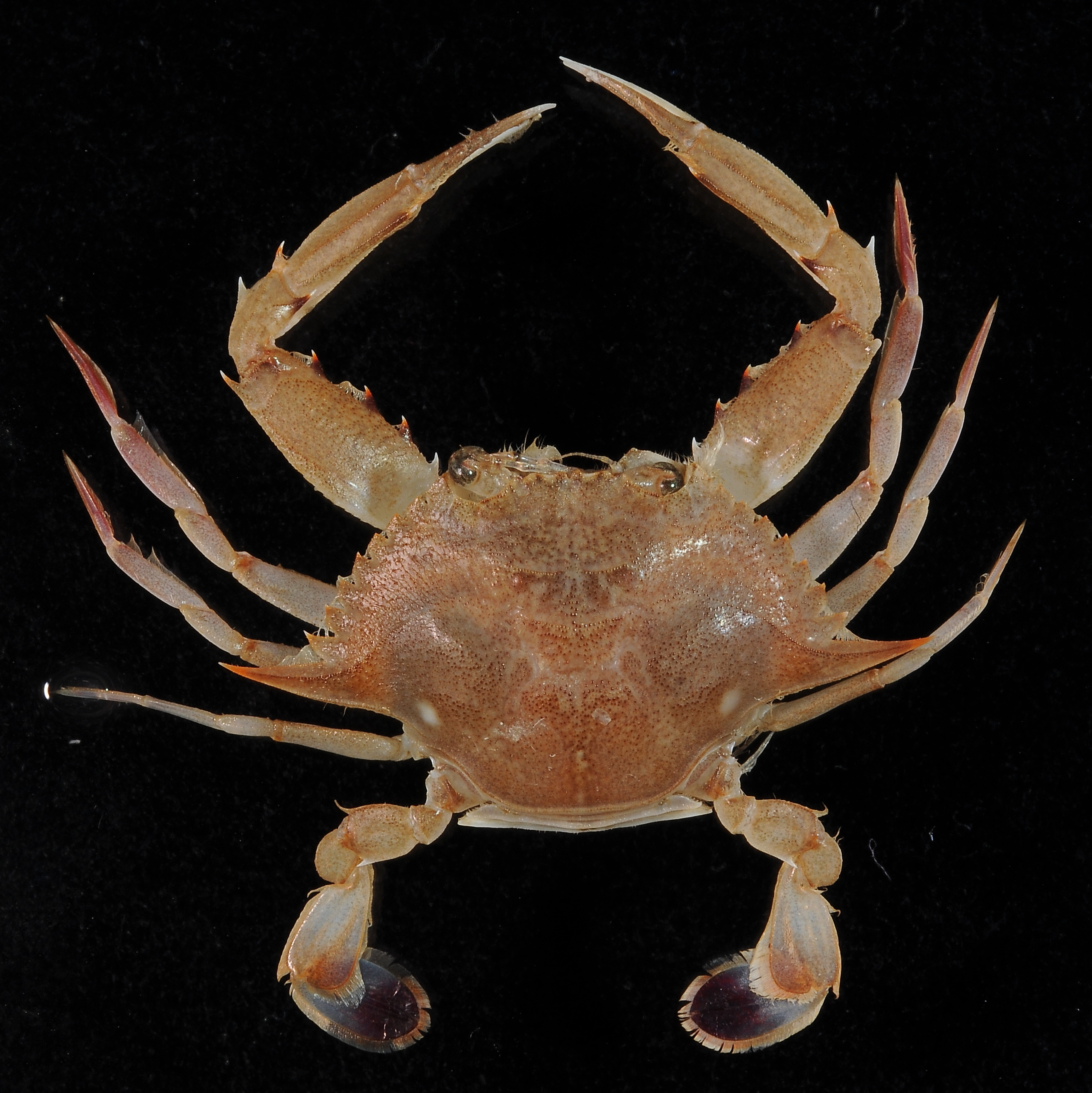

Scientific classification
- Kingdom: Animalia
- Phylum: Arthropoda
- Clade: Pancrustacea
- Class: Malacostraca
- Order: Decapoda
- Suborder: Pleocyemata
- Infraorder: Brachyura
- Family: Portunidae
- Genus: Portunus
- Species: P. sayi

Binomial name
- Portunus sayi (Gibbes, 1850)

Synonyms
- Lupa parvula Desbonne 1867; Lupa sayi Gibbes, 1850; Lupea pudica Gerstaecker, 1856; Portunus tropicalis Marion de Procé, 1822

= Portunus sayi =

Species of crab

Portunus sayi, the sargassum swimming crab, is a species of pelagic crab in the family Portunidae. It is found in the western Atlantic Ocean and the Caribbean Sea where it makes its home among floating mats of Sargassum seaweed. It was named in honour of the American naturalist Thomas Say.

== Description ==
Portunus sayi grows to a length of about 5 to 7.5 cm (2 to 3 in). Its smooth, shiny carapace is nearly twice as broad as it is long and has six interorbital teeth. The chelipeds (claws) are larger in males than in females and the spines they bear have orange margins. The carapace, claws and legs are usually pale brown with large white or flesh-coloured blotches but the brown colour may have a purplish or greenish tinge. This crab, like other members of its family, is specially adapted for swimming rather than walking as its fourth pair of legs are modified with flattened, paddle-like surfaces. It swims sideways rather than forwards and can move surprisingly swiftly.

== Distribution ==
Portunus sayi occurs in the western Atlantic Ocean and Caribbean Sea. Its range extends from Nova Scotia and the Gulf of Maine to southern Florida, Bermuda, the Bahamas and the Gulf of Mexico. It is found at depths down to about 18 metres (59 ft).

== Behaviour ==
Portunus sayi is a swimming crab that lives among the tangled masses of Sargassum, a type of brown seaweed that floats in the Sargasso Sea. It is part of a community inhabiting these floating masses which includes fish, nudibranchs, crustaceans, hydroids, bryozoans and polychaete worms. Its colouring provides camouflage among the fronds of seaweed through which it hunts or lies in wait to ambush small items of prey. It has been shown that the crab chooses Sargassum spp. over similar seaweeds such as Thalassia testudinum by detecting chemical cues in the water.

This crab has also been found as an epibiont of loggerhead turtles along with the goose barnacles Lepas anatifera and Conchoderma virgatum, various other crabs, sea spiders, tunicates and hydroids. This is not surprising as young loggerhead turtles live among the floating mats of Sargassum algae feeding on the fauna found there.
