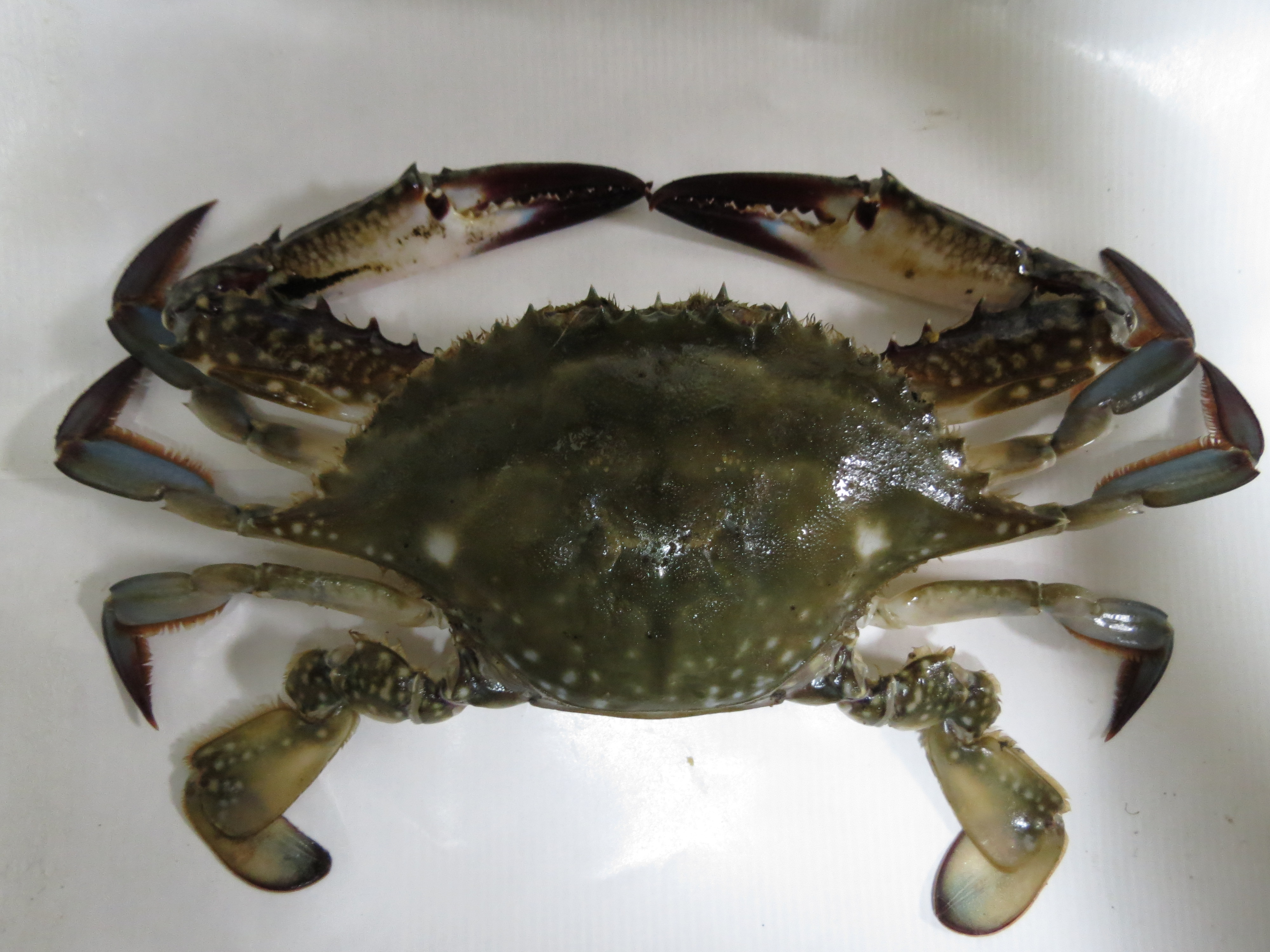

Scientific classification
- Kingdom: Animalia
- Phylum: Arthropoda
- Clade: Pancrustacea
- Class: Malacostraca
- Order: Decapoda
- Suborder: Pleocyemata
- Infraorder: Brachyura
- Family: Portunidae
- Genus: Portunus
- Species: P. trituberculatus

Binomial name
- Portunus trituberculatus (Miers, 1876)

Synonyms
- Neptunus trituberculatus Miers, 1876

= Portunus trituberculatus =

Species of crab

Portunus trituberculatus, also known as the gazami crab, Japanese swimming crab or horse crab, is a species of crab commonly found off the coasts of East Asia and is closely related to Portunus armatus.

== Fishery ==
Global capture production of Gazami crab (Portunus trituberculatus) in thousand tonnes from 1950 to 2022, as reported by the FAO

Portunus trituberculatus is the most widely fished species of crab in the world, with over 300,000 tonnes being caught annually, 98% of it off the coast of China. The species is considered highly nutritious, especially in regard to crab cream (roe).

== Distribution ==
Portunus trituberculatus is found off the coasts of Korea, Japan, China, and Taiwan.

== Description ==
The carapace may reach 15 centimetres (5.9 in) wide, and 7 cm (2.8 in) from front to back. P. trituberculatus may be distinguished from the closely related (and also widely fished) P. armatus by the number of broad teeth on the front of the carapace (three in P. trituberculatus, four in P. armatus) and on the inner margin of the merus (four in P. trituberculatus, three in P. armatus).

== Relationship to humans ==
=== Controversy ===
Due to the increased farming breeding of Portunus trituberculatus, the natural habitat environment of the crab has significantly declined. It has also diminished the gazami crab's immune system which has led to the decline in its ability to fight off diseases. P. trituberculatus has suffered from many dieases most notably Decapod iridescent virus 1 (DIV1) Vibrio parahaemolyticus.

These diseases have ultimately reduced the overall health of the crabbing industry.

== Taxonomy ==
Portunus trituberculatus was first described in 1876 by Edward J. Miers, under the name Neptunus trituberculatus. To better understand the species development, evolution and reproduction a reference genome has been sequenced, assembling to 1.0 Gb in size and anchoring to 50 chromosomes. And demonstrating it diverged from the Chinese mitten crab around 183.5 million years ago.

== Virus research ==
In 2019 it was discovered that gazami crab populations in China are commonly infected with the Flavivirus Wenzhou shark flavivirus which was previously identified in all tissues of the Pacific spadenose shark, Scoliodon macrorhynchos. While currently unknown if Wenzhou shark flavivirus causes disease in infected shark hosts, this virus moves horizontally between gazami crabs and sharks in ocean ecosystems in a manner similar to other Flavivirus infections such as Dengue virus, which cycle horizontally between arthropod (mosquito) and vertebrate hosts.
