= Yehliu Ocean World =

Oceanarium in Wanli, New Taipei, Taiwan

Yehliu Ocean World 野柳海洋世界
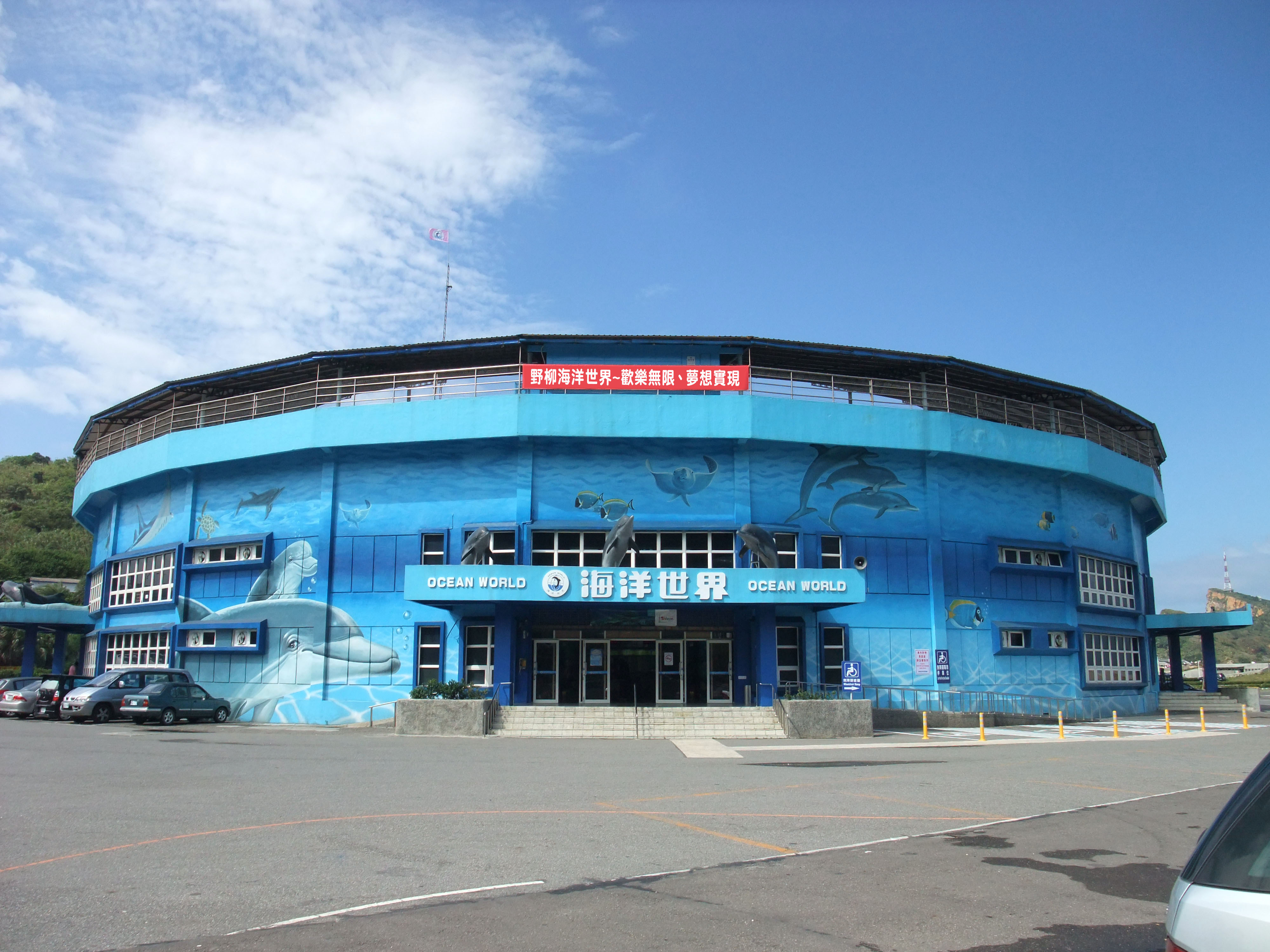
- Interactive map of Yehliu Ocean World 野柳海洋世界
- Location: Wanli, New Taipei, Taiwan
- Coordinates: 25°12′19.2″N 121°41′28.2″E
- Opened: 1980
- Theme: oceanarium
- Website: Official website

The Yehliu Ocean World (Chinese: 野柳海洋世界; pinyin: Yěliǔ Hǎiyáng Shìjiè) is an oceanarium in Yehliu Village, Wanli District, New Taipei, Taiwan.

== History ==
The oceanarium was opened in 1980. On 13 July 2013, the building was hit by surge of waves caused by Typhoon Soulik causing NT$5 million in damage.

== Architecture ==
The theme park has a seating capacity of 3,500 seats. It also includes a 100 meters long underwater tunnel.

== Attractions ==
The oceanarium features an aquarium which consists of various sea creatures.

== Transportation ==
The theme park is accessible by bus from Keelung Station of Taiwan Railway.

== See also ==
- List of tourist attractions in Taiwan
