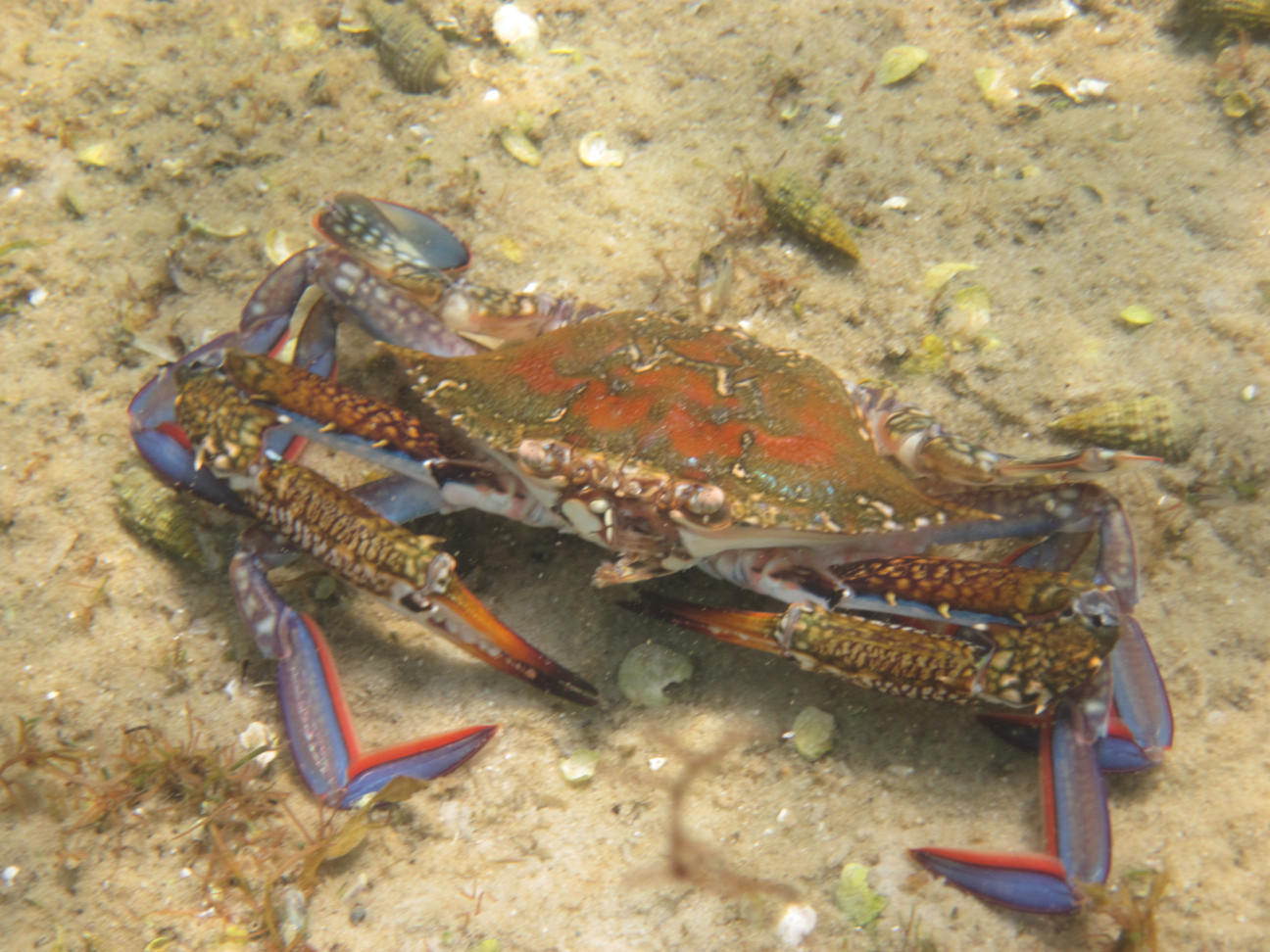
- African Blue Swimming Crab (Portunus segnis) Praia Do Bilene: In the Coastal lake of Bilene, Mozambique

Scientific classification
- Kingdom: Animalia
- Phylum: Arthropoda
- Clade: Pancrustacea
- Class: Malacostraca
- Order: Decapoda
- Suborder: Pleocyemata
- Infraorder: Brachyura
- Family: Portunidae
- Genus: Portunus
- Species: P. segnis

Binomial name
- Portunus segnis (Forskål, 1775)

Synonyms
- Cancer segnis Forskål, 1775; Portunus mauritianus Ward, 1942

= Portunus segnis =

Species of crab

Portunus segnis, the African blue swimming crab, is a species of crustacean, a swimming crab belonging to the family Portunidae. While native to the western Indian Ocean, it is also invasive in the Mediterranean. It is thought to have come through the Suez Canal from the Red Sea but it may have been transported by ships.

== Taxonomy ==
Portunus segnis was first formally described in 1775 as Cancer segnis by the Swedish-speaking Finnish explorer, orientalist, naturalist, and an apostle of Carl Linnaeus Peter Forsskål with the type locality given as “Mari Rubro”, the Red Sea. It has been classified within the subgenus Portunus by some authorities. Until a review of the genus Portunus in 2010 P. segnis was considered to be a junior synonym of Portunus pelagicus. The specific name segnis means “slow”, “torpid”, “lazy”, “unenergetic”, “tardy” or “inactive”, and Forskål described it as proceeding slowly in water ("tarde procedit in aqua").

== Description ==
Portunus segnis males have a dark olive green blue carapace marked with numerous pale white spots on especially towards the rear and along the sides. These spots typically do not join to create reticulated bands but if these bands are present then it is usually thinner in the closely related P. pelagicus. The females are similar to the males except that the tips of their legs are red with a brownish red tinge rather than being blue tinged with intense rusty red. The largest specimen recorded was an egg bearing female which measured 187.8 mm × 84.3 mm (7.39 in × 3.32 in).

== Distribution and habitat ==
Portunus segnis is found in the western Indian Ocean from the eastern African coast and the Red Sea east to Pakistan and south to Madagascar and Mauritius. They were first recorded in the Mediterranean in 1898 at Port Said in Egypt, one of the first Lessepsian migrants to be recorded in that sea. It has now spread as far west as Italy and the Gulf of Gabes in Tunisia.

Portunus segnis occurs largely in coastal waters in seagrass beds and mangroves. it is often encountered under rocks and in rock pools, as well as on sand or mud seabeds. They are most abundant at depths between 2 and 15 m (6 ft 7 in and 49 ft 3 in). The small juveniles occur at depth of less than 1 m (3 ft 3 in) while the females move to deeper water to spawn.

== Biology ==
The diet of Portunus segnis is seasonally dependent, with them eating crustaceans such as other crabs and shrimps more prominently in the summer, and fishes and molluscs more common in the autumn and winter. Although the aforementioned animals form the major part of this species’s diet, studies have identified annelids, cnidarians, plants, and even debris in the stomach of Portunus segnis subjects. This species is mainly nocturnal and hunts across the surface using a zigzag pattern to find its prey, spending the day buried in the sediment with only its eyes, antennae and gills clear of the substrate. In the Persian Gulf and Gulf of Oman egg-bearing females have been reported from all months of the year but their numbers peak in the Autumn. spawning peaks in the winter.

This species is euryhaline, showing a wide tolerance of variations in salinity and can be found in the brackish waters in estuarine environments and in extremely salty waters such as the Great Bitter Lake in Egypt.

The epizoic acorn barnacle Chelonibia patula has been collected from the exoskeleton of this species in the eastern Mediterranean Sea. In addition, a species of Octolasmis, goose barnacles belonging to the family Poecilasmatidae have been recorded on this species. Another condition of P. segnis is the “pepper spot parasite”, which is caused by protozoan hyperparasites which infect cysts containing trematodes and causes then to produce melanin. One of the reasons put forward for the abundance of this species in the Mediterranean is that there are not enough octopuses to predate on them.

== Fisheries ==
Portunus segnis is fished for using shrimp trawls, seine nets and stake nets in the Persian Gulf. In 1982 over 100 tonnes was landed in Bahrain and egg-bearing females fetch the highest prices.

=== Tunisia ===
Portunus segnis reached Tunisian waters in 2014. It has proved very destructive to fish stocks and fishing gear. It is now itself a species profitably fished for. Tunisian fishermen nickname it "Daesh" after the Islamic State of Iraq and the Levant because of its invasiveness and destructiveness.

A new fishery to catch them has started. The fishermen were trained to use pots to catch them. The crabs are not eaten in Tunisia but are exported to Spain and Italy, as well as the United States and Asia.
