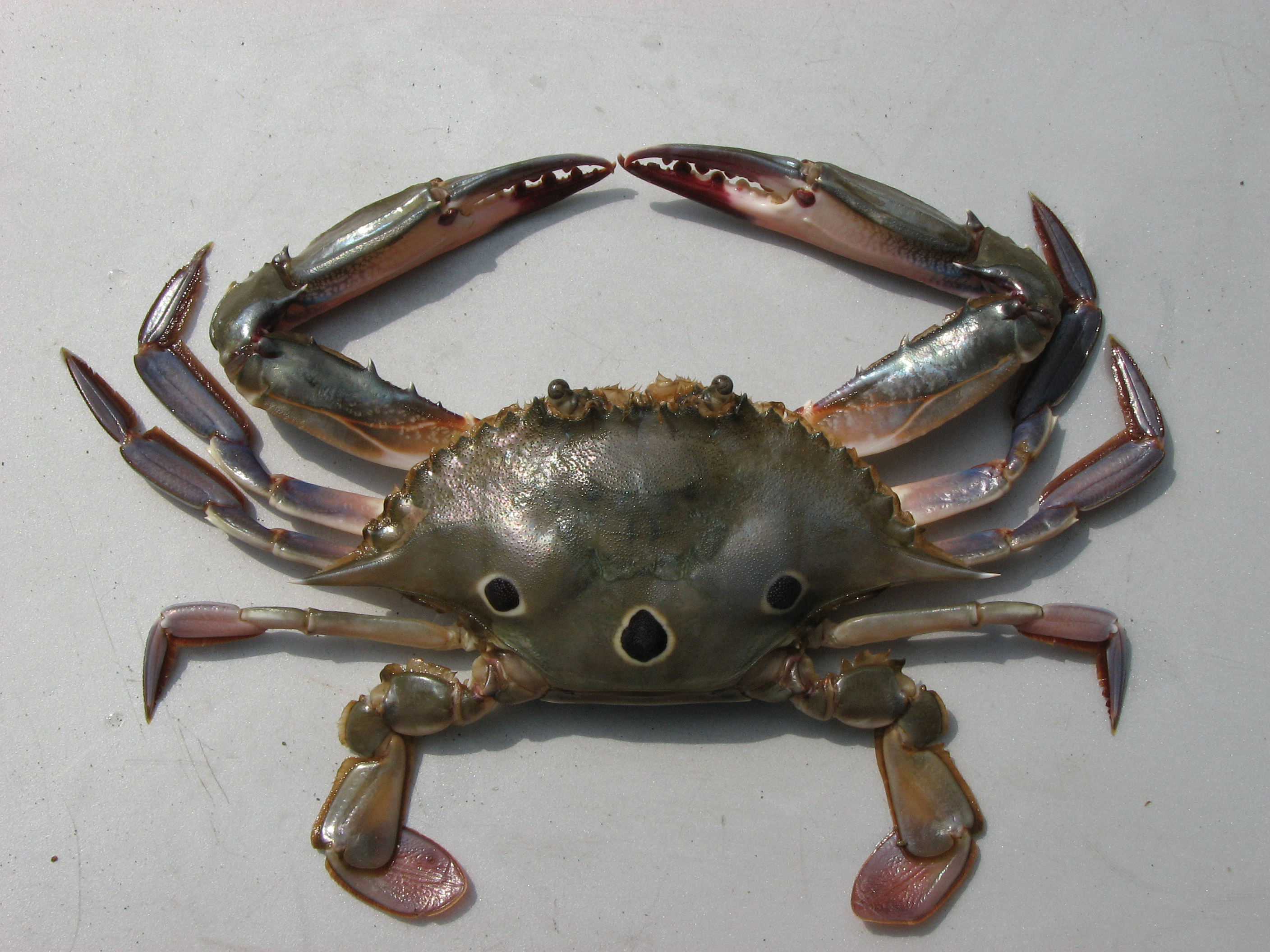

Scientific classification
- Kingdom: Animalia
- Phylum: Arthropoda
- Clade: Pancrustacea
- Class: Malacostraca
- Order: Decapoda
- Suborder: Pleocyemata
- Infraorder: Brachyura
- Family: Portunidae
- Genus: Portunus
- Species: P. sanguinolentus

Binomial name
- Portunus sanguinolentus (Herbst, 1783)

Synonyms
- Cancer raihoae Curtiss, 1938; Lupa sanguinolentus (Herbst, 1783)

= Portunus sanguinolentus =

Species of crab

Portunus sanguinolentus, the three-spot swimming crab, blood-spotted swimming crab or red-spotted swimming crab, is a large crab found throughout estuaries of the Indian and West Pacific Oceanic countries.

== Distribution ==
Portunus sanguinolentus is a cosmopolitan species widely distributed across all major waters of the Indo-Pacific; it is found throughout the Red Sea, the Persian Gulf, Mozambique, South Africa, Madagascar, Mauritius, Pakistan, India, Bangladesh, the Maldives, Sri Lanka, the Andaman Islands, Myanmar, the Malay Peninsula, Thailand, Japan, Korea, Taiwan, China, Singapore, Indonesia, the Philippines, Java, Australia, and Hawaii.

== Subspecies ==
Two subspecies are recognized:

- Portunus (Portunus) sanguinolentus hawaiiensis Stephenson, 1968
- Portunus (Portunus) sanguinolentus sanguinolentus (Herbst, 1783)

== Description ==
Portunus sanguinolentus is a large crab with a maximum length of 15–20 cm (5.9–7.9 in). Its greyish green carapace is very broad and characterized by 3 red spots in posterior half. A strong spine can be seen on each side. Its swimming legs are flattened and its claws are long.

== Ecology ==
Primarily a carnivore, found in marine waters and intertidal zone by juveniles. Inhabits sandy to muddy substrates. It is a harmless crab, but being pinched by its claws can be painful.

Commercially harvested as an edible crab species in many countries.
