= Yehliu =

Cape in New Taipei, Taiwan

Coordinates: 25.2131°N 121.698°E

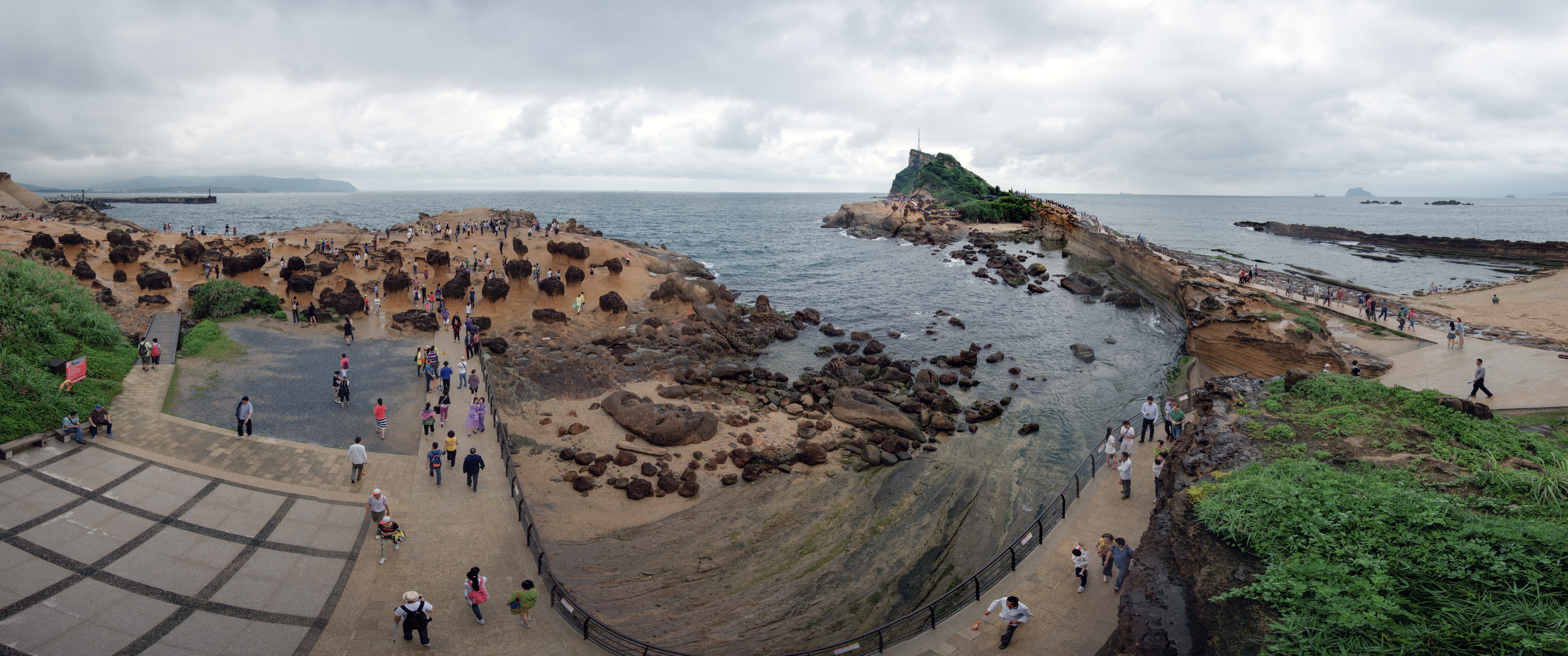
Yehliu

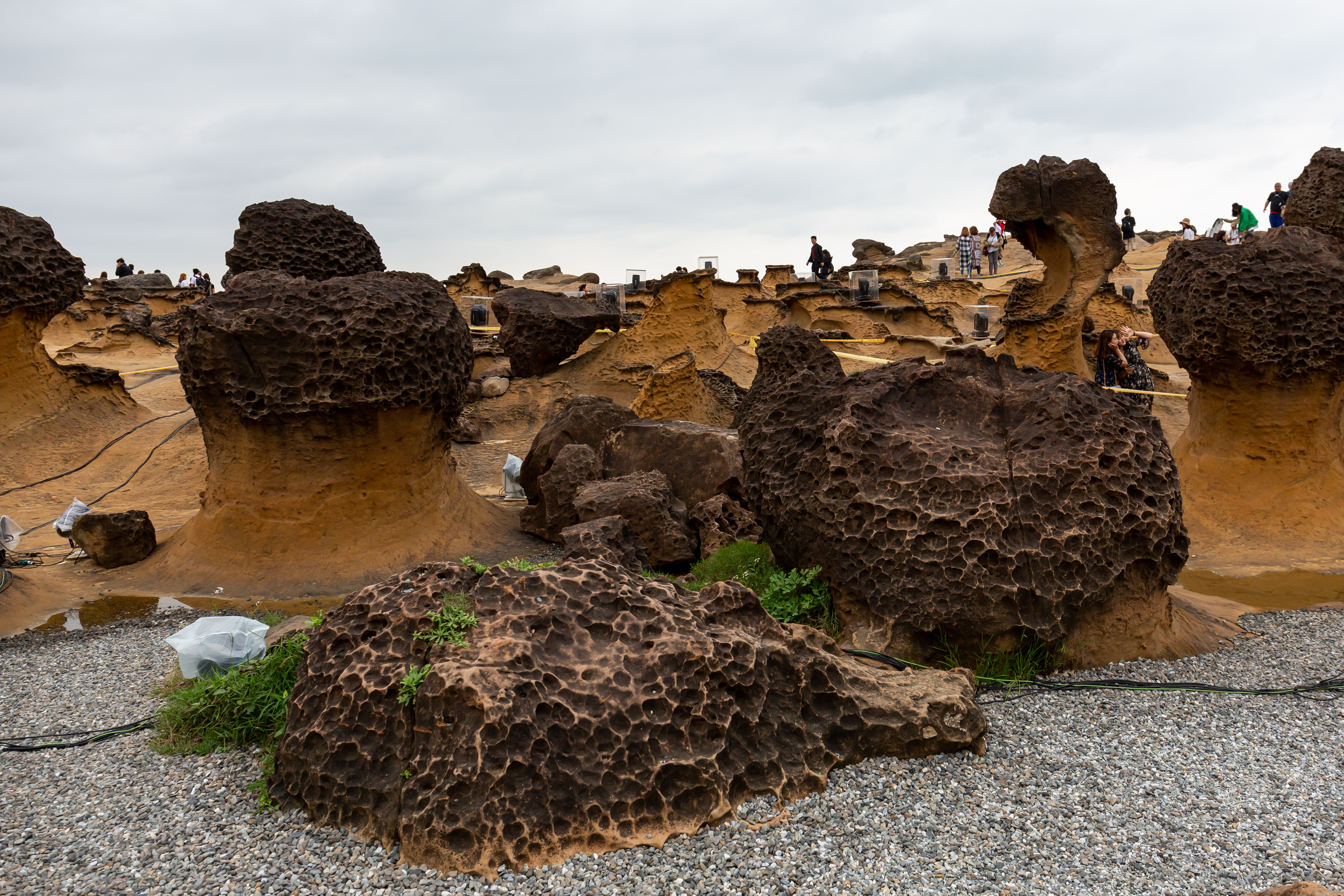
Rock formations within the geopark

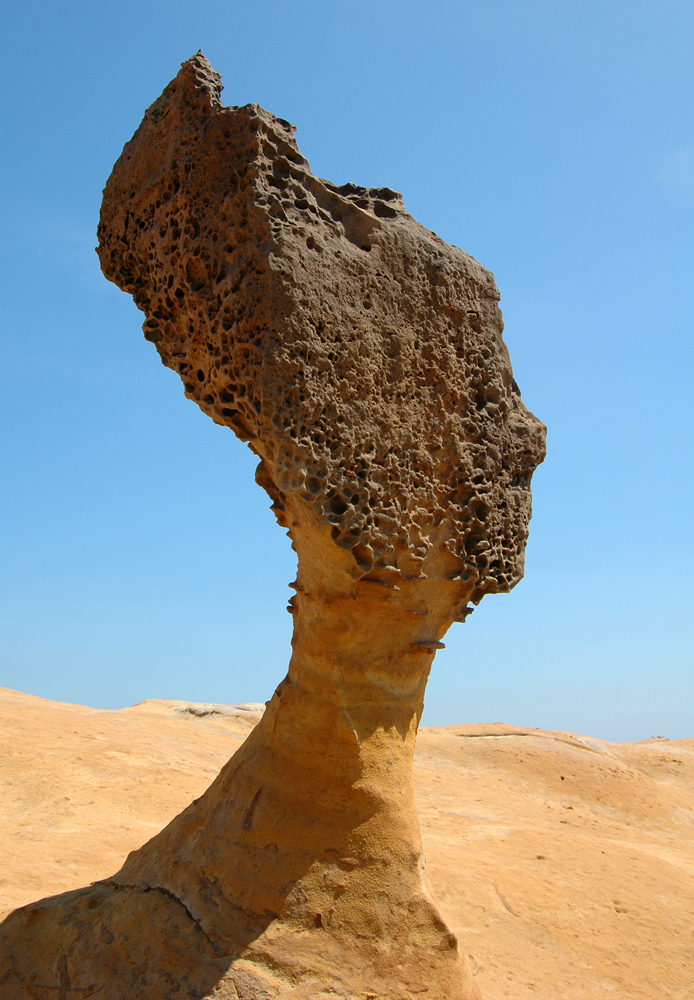
The Queen's Head rock in 2019

Yehliu (Chinese: 野柳; pinyin: Yěliǔ), also referred to as Yehliu Promontory, is a cape, headland, and promontory in Wanli District, New Taipei, Taiwan. It forms part of the Daliao Miocene Formation and stretches approximately 1,700 metres (5,600 ft) into the ocean. It was formed six million years ago, after the collision of the Philippine Sea plate and Eurasian plate; tectonics then pushed the Datun Mountains out of the sea. Strong ocean waves crashed against the soft sedimentary rock and softer layers wore away faster than harder ones. This uneven wear created top-heavy hoodoo stones. These are visible at the Yehliu Geopark in the North Coast and Guanyinshan National Scenic Area.

The most notable stone at Yehliu is "Queen's Head" (女王頭). Named after its resemblance to Queen Elizabeth I's head, the rock is over 4,000 years old and receives three million visitors per year. The neck has a length of 125 centimetres (49 in). Since 2017, the rock has lost 5 inches (13 cm). A smaller rock formation, referred to as "Princess Head", was created in January 2010, in order to reduce the tourist burden on Queen's Head. Other popular stones in the geopark include "Fairy Shoe" and "Candlestick Rock".

== See also ==
- Yehliu Ocean World
- List of tourist attractions in Taiwan
