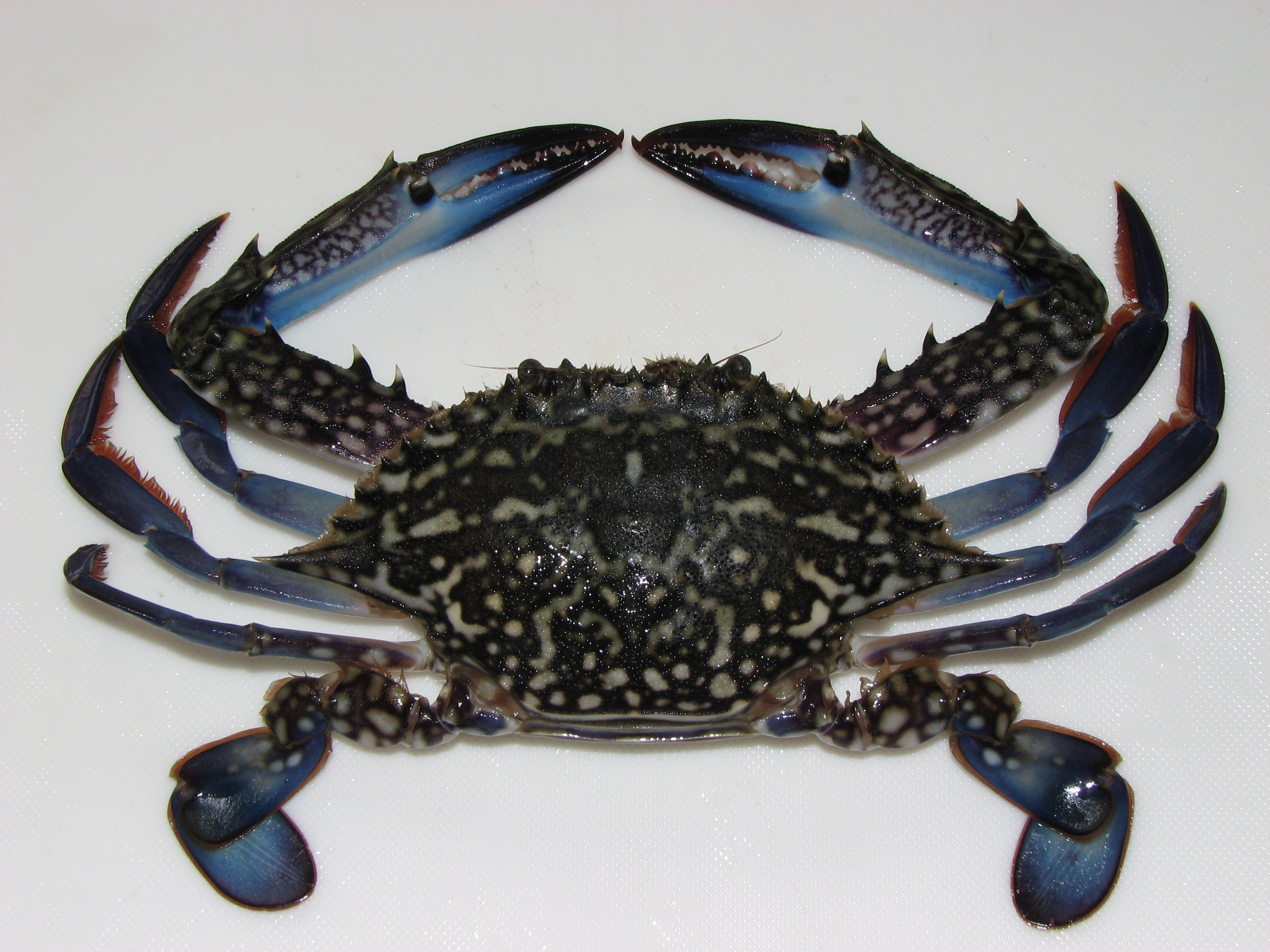
- Male

Scientific classification
- Kingdom: Animalia
- Phylum: Arthropoda
- Clade: Pancrustacea
- Class: Malacostraca
- Order: Decapoda
- Suborder: Pleocyemata
- Infraorder: Brachyura
- Family: Portunidae
- Genus: Portunus
- Species: P. pelagicus

Binomial name
- Portunus pelagicus (Linnaeus, 1758)

Synonyms
- Cancer pelagicus Linnaeus, 1758

= Portunus pelagicus =

Species of crab

Portunus pelagicus, also known as the blue crab, blue swimmer crab, blue manna crab and flower crab is a species of large crab found in the Indo-Pacific, including off the coasts of Indonesia, Malaysia, Cambodia, Thailand, the Philippines, and Vietnam; and in the intertidal estuaries around most of Australia and east to New Caledonia.

== Description ==
The males are bright blue in color with white spots and with characteristically long chelipeds, while the females have a duller green/brown, with a more rounded carapace. The carapace can be up to 20 centimetres (7.9 in) wide.

== Behaviour ==
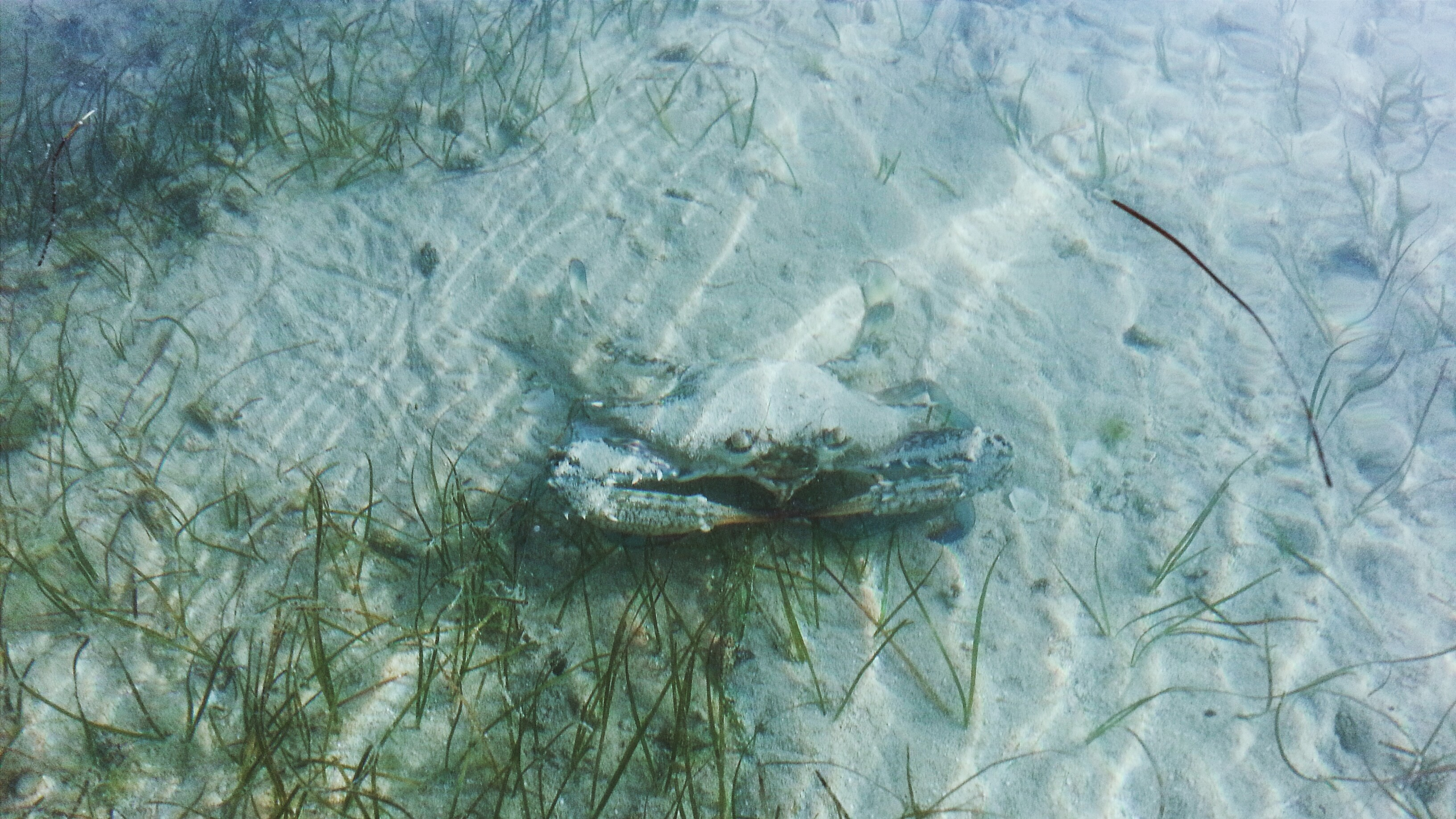
Portunus pelagicus feeding, Qatif, Saudi Arabia.

They stay buried under sand or mud most of the time, particularly during the daytime and winter, which may explain their high tolerance to ammonium (NH_{4}^{+}) and ammonia (NH_{3}). They come out to feed during high tide on various organisms such as bivalves, fish and, to a lesser extent, macroalgae. They are excellent swimmers, largely due to a pair of flattened legs that resemble paddles. However, in contrast to another portunid crab (Scylla serrata), they cannot survive for long periods out of the water.

== Capture ==
Global capture production of Portunus pelagicus in thousand tonnes from 1965 to 2022, as reported by the FAO

The species is commercially important throughout the Indo-Pacific, where they may be sold as traditional hard shells, or as "soft-shelled" crabs, which are considered a delicacy throughout Asia. The species is highly prized as a substitute for Callinectes sapidus. This species is fished heavily and almost exclusively for meat consumption in the Persian Gulf, with the females sold at higher prices than males.

These characteristics, along with their fast growth, ease of larviculture, high fecundity, and relatively high tolerance to both nitrate and ammonia, (particularly ammoniacal nitrogen, NH_{3}–N, which is typically more toxic than ammonium, as it can more easily diffuse across the gill membranes), makes this species ideal for aquaculture.

The species is commercially fished in Australia, and is also available to recreational fishers and is regulated by various state governments. Relevant recreational fishing regulations for Australia (as of March 2016) are tabled below.

State	Minimum carapace	Bag limit	Boat limit	Possession Limit	Notes
South Australia	11 cm	20 (Gulf St Vincent) or 40 (combined with sand crabs)	60 (Gulf St Vincent) or 120 (combined with sand crabs)	N/A	
New South Wales	6 cm	10	N/A	20	
Western Australia	12.7 cm	20 or 10 (West Coast)	40 or 20 (West Coast)	N/A	Cockburn Sound is closed. Peel-Harvey Estuary is closed from 1 September to 31 October.
Queensland	11.5 cm	No limit	No limit	No limit	
Northern Territory	N/A	N/A	N/A	30	Combined total for any crab species other than mud crabs.

== Ecology ==
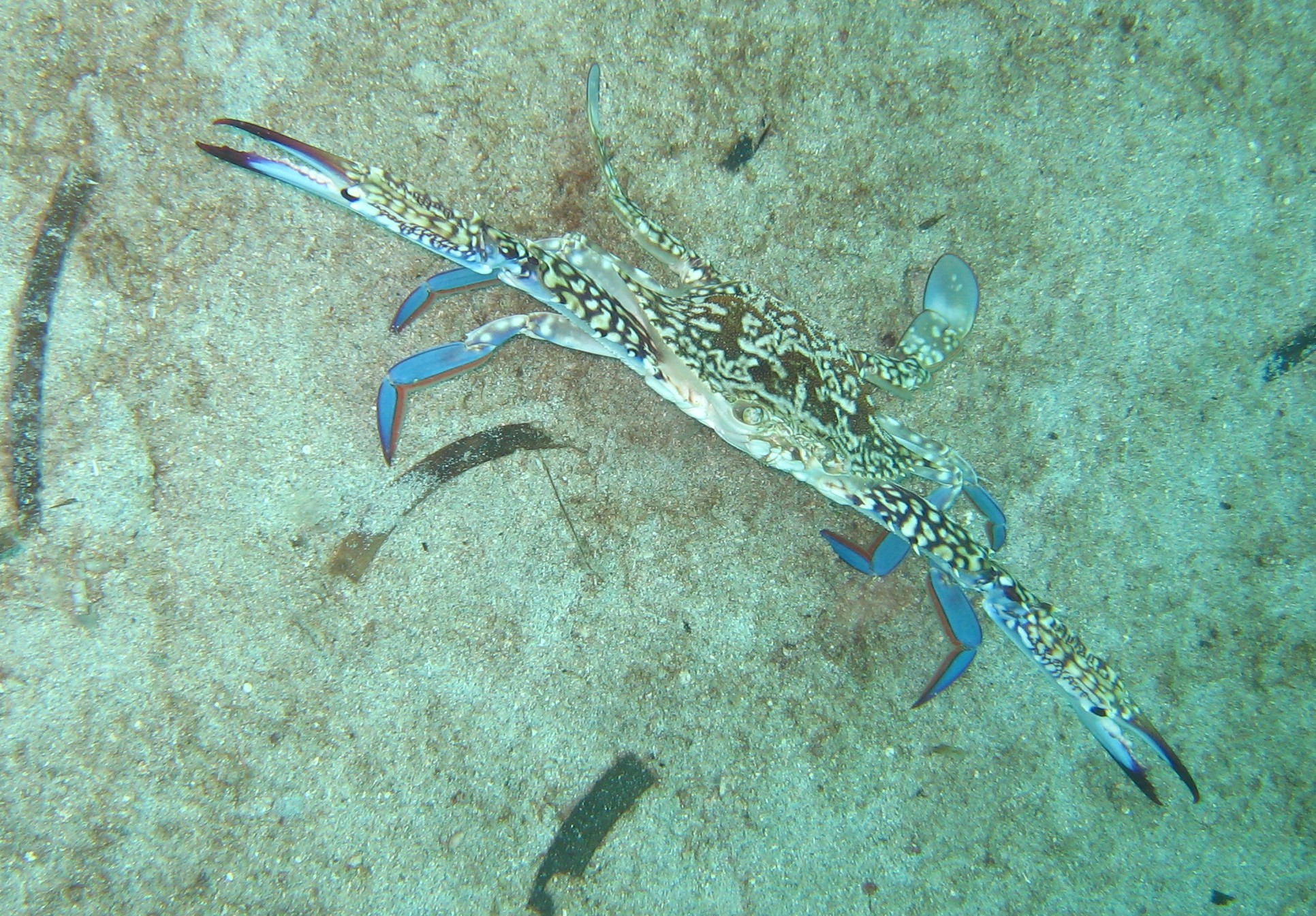
Male Portunus pelagicus can be territorial.

P. pelagicus commonly enters estuaries for food and shelter. Its life cycle is dependent on estuaries as the larvae and early juveniles use these habitats for growth and development. Prior to hatching, the female moves into shallow marine habitats, releases her eggs, and the newly-hatched zoea I larvae move into estuaries. During this time, they feed on microscopic plankton and progress from the zoea I stage to the zoea IV stage (approximately 8 days) and then to the final larval stage of megalopa (duration of 4–6 days). This larval stage is characterised by having large chelipeds used to catch prey. Once the megalopa metamorphoses to the crab stage, they continue to spend time in estuaries which provides a suitable habitat for shelter and food. However, evidence has shown that early juveniles cannot tolerate low salinities for extended periods, which is likely due to its weak hyper-osmoregulatory abilities. This likely accounts for their mass emigration from estuaries to seawater during the rainy season. Furthermore, male Portunus pelagicus are believed to become more territorial in colder water; this behavior potentially explains why they are rarely sighted in close proximity in temperate waters and may also clarify why females appear more prolific in these regions.

== Cultural significance ==
The movement of this species of crab is the basis for the dance steps and movements of the Linambay, a variation of the Moro-moro that originates from Carcar, Cebu, in the Philippines, where the crab is called "Lambay".
