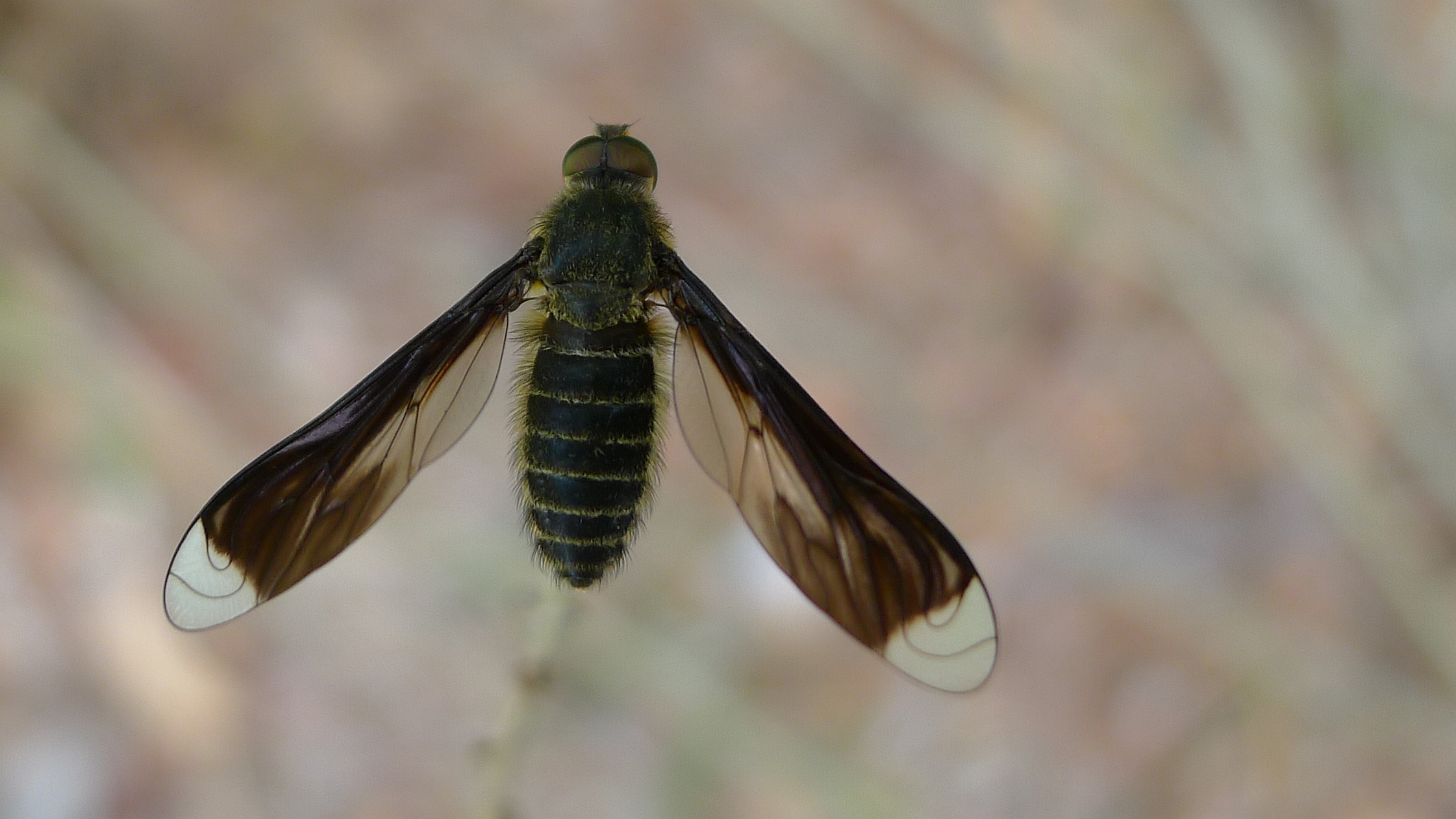
- Comptosia quadripennis, Australia

Scientific classification
- Kingdom: Animalia
- Phylum: Arthropoda
- Class: Insecta
- Order: Diptera
- Superfamily: Asiloidea
- Family: Bombyliidae
- Genus: Comptosia; Macquart, 1840

Type species
- Comptosia fascipennis Macquart, 1840

Synonyms
- Alyosia Rondani, 1863; Camptosia Macquart, 1840

= Comptosia =

Genus of flies

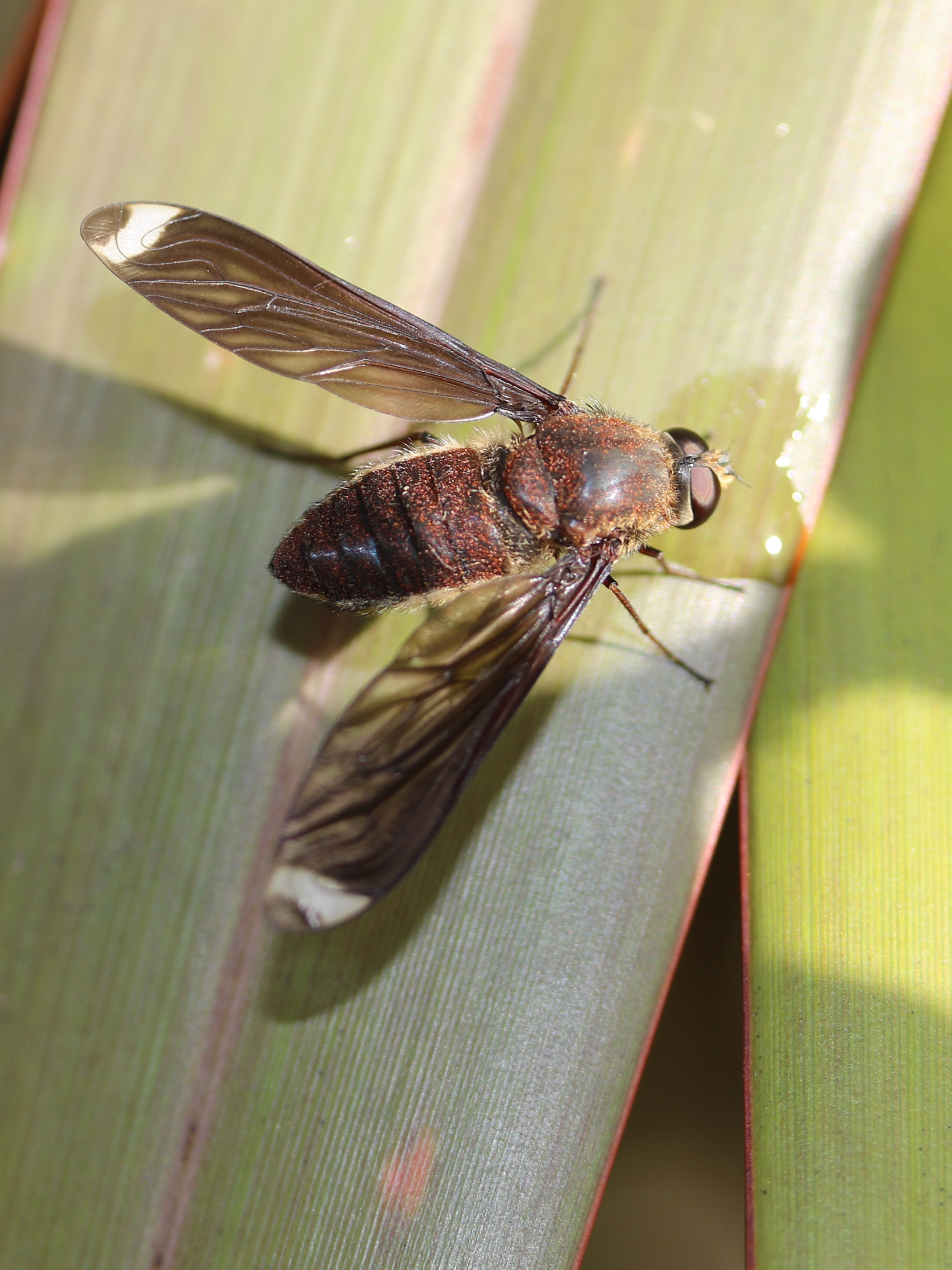
Comptosia apicalis, Australia

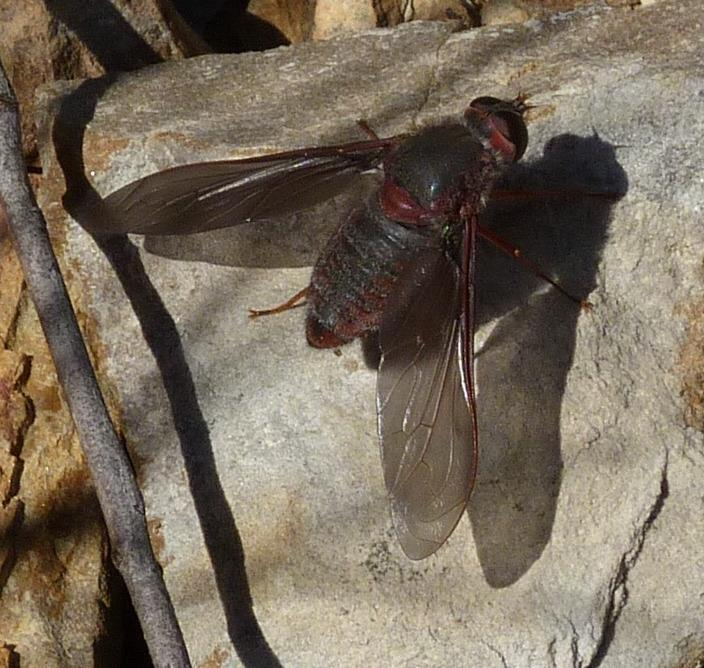
Comptosia insignis, Australia

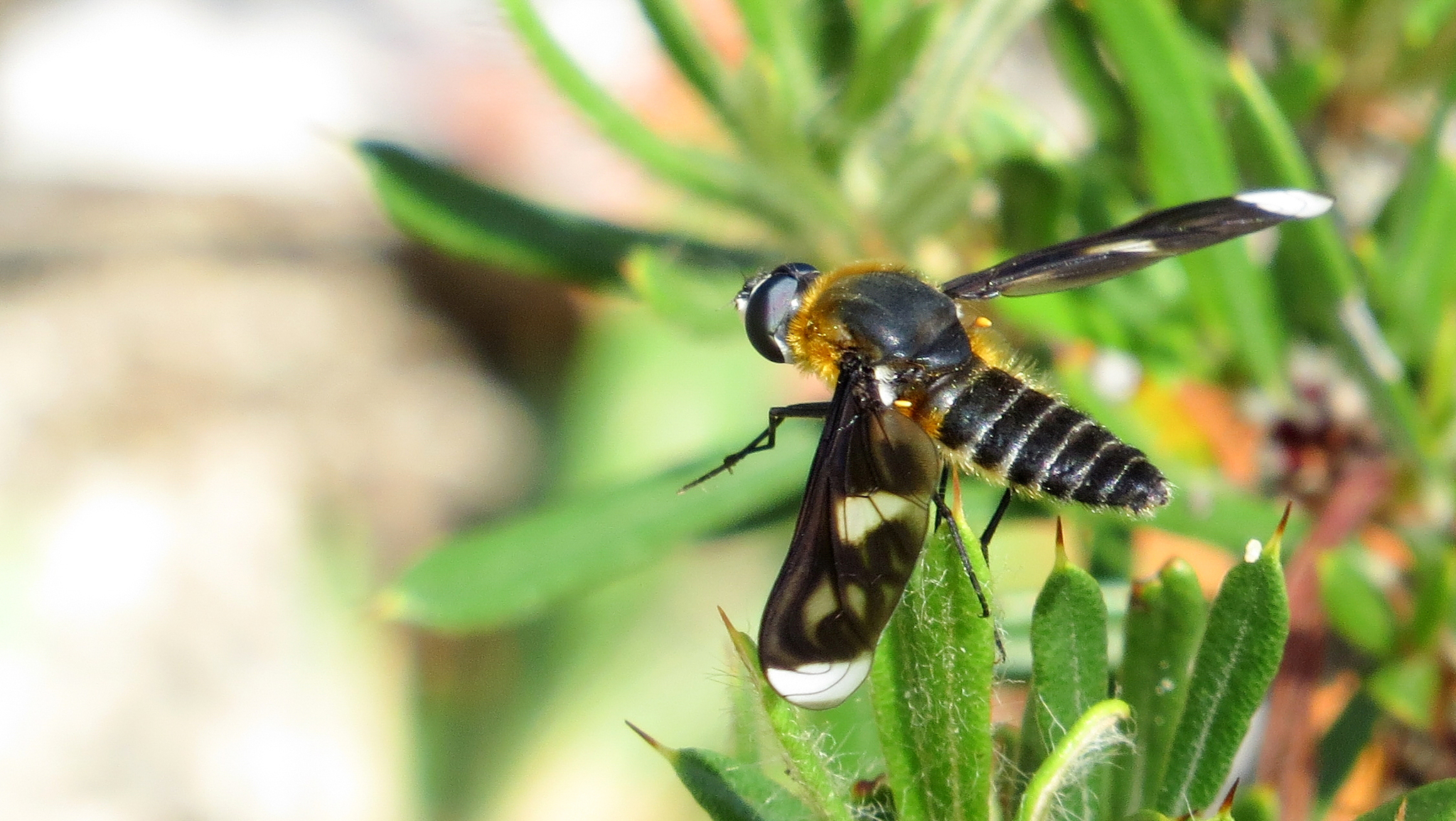
Comptosia neobiguttata, Australia

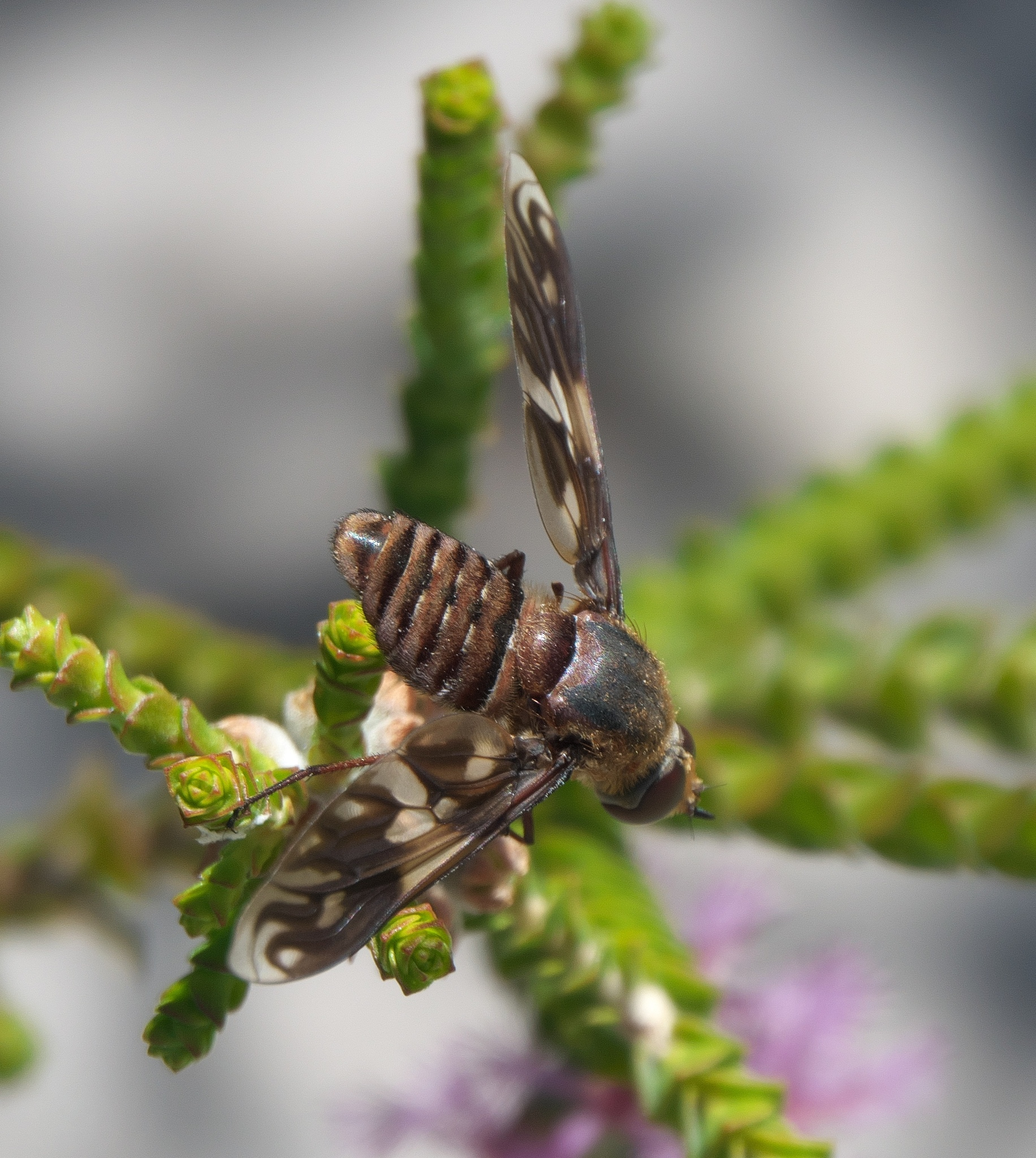
Comptosia tendens, Australia

Comptosia is a genus of bee flies (insects in the family Bombyliidae). The genus contains least 67 described species, found primarily in Australia. It includes the common Australian insects Comptosia apicalis, Comptosia neobiguttata, and Comptosia insignis.

== Species ==
These 67 species belong to the genus Comptosia:

- Comptosia acantha Yeates, 1991
- Comptosia apicalis Macquart, 1848
- Comptosia aurescens Yeates, 1991
- Comptosia australensis (Schiner, 1868)
- Comptosia bancrofti Edwards, 1934
- Comptosia barrowensis Yestes & Oberprieler, 2013
- Comptosia basalis (Walker, 1849)
- Comptosia biguttata Edwards, 1934
- Comptosia brunnea Edwards, 1934
- Comptosia brunnipennis Wulp, 1869
- Comptosia caesariata Yeates, 1991
- Comptosia calignea Yeates, 1991
- Comptosia capillata Yeates, 1991
- Comptosia casimira Hull, 1973
- Comptosia decedens (Walker, 1849)
- Comptosia extensa (Walker, 1835)
- Comptosia fascipennis Macquart, 1840
- Comptosia flava Yeates, 1991
- Comptosia flavipenna Yeates, 1991
- Comptosia flexuosa Yeates, 1991
- Comptosia gemina Hardy, 1941
- Comptosia heliophila Yeates, 1991
- Comptosia inclusa (Walker, 1849)
- Comptosia indecora (Wulp, 1885)
- Comptosia insignis (Walker, 1849)
- Comptosia insula Yeates, 1991
- Comptosia karijinii Yeates & Oberprieler, 2013
- Comptosia kuranda Yeates, 1991
- Comptosia lactea Yeates, 1991
- Comptosia mackerrasi Yeates, 1991
- Comptosia magna Yeates, 1991
- Comptosia mallota Yeates, 1991
- Comptosia microrhynchus Yeates, 1991
- Comptosia moretonii Macquart, 1855
- Comptosia murina (Newman, 1841)
- Comptosia neoapicalis Yeates, 1991
- Comptosia neobiguttata Yeates, 1991
- Comptosia neosobria Yeates, 1991
- Comptosia nigrescens (Newman, 1841)
- Comptosia nitella Yeates, 1991
- Comptosia ocellata (Newman, 1841)
- Comptosia paramonovi Yeates, 1991
- Comptosia partita (Newman, 1841)
- Comptosia paucispina Yeates, 1991
- Comptosia pilosa Yeates, 1991
- Comptosia pitereka Yeates, 1991
- Comptosia praeargentata (Macleay, 1826)
- Comptosia quadripennis (Walker, 1849)
- Comptosia rubrifera (Bigot, 1881)
- Comptosia sandaraca Yeates, 1991
- Comptosia scitula Yeates, 1991
- Comptosia sobria (Walker, 1849)
- Comptosia sobricula (Walker, 1857)
- Comptosia soror Yeates, 1991
- Comptosia speciosa Yeates, 1991
- Comptosia stria (Walker, 1849)
- Comptosia sylvana (Fabricius, 1775)
- Comptosia tendens (Walker, 1849)
- Comptosia thyris Yeates, 1991
- Comptosia tutela Yeates, 1991
- Comptosia vittata Edwards, 1934
- Comptosia walkeri Edwards, 1934
- Comptosia wilkinsi Edwards, 1934
- Comptosia xanthobasis Yeates, 1991
- Comptosia zona Yeates, 1991
- † Comptosia miranda (Cockerell, 1909)
- † Comptosia pria Wedmann & Yeates, 2008
