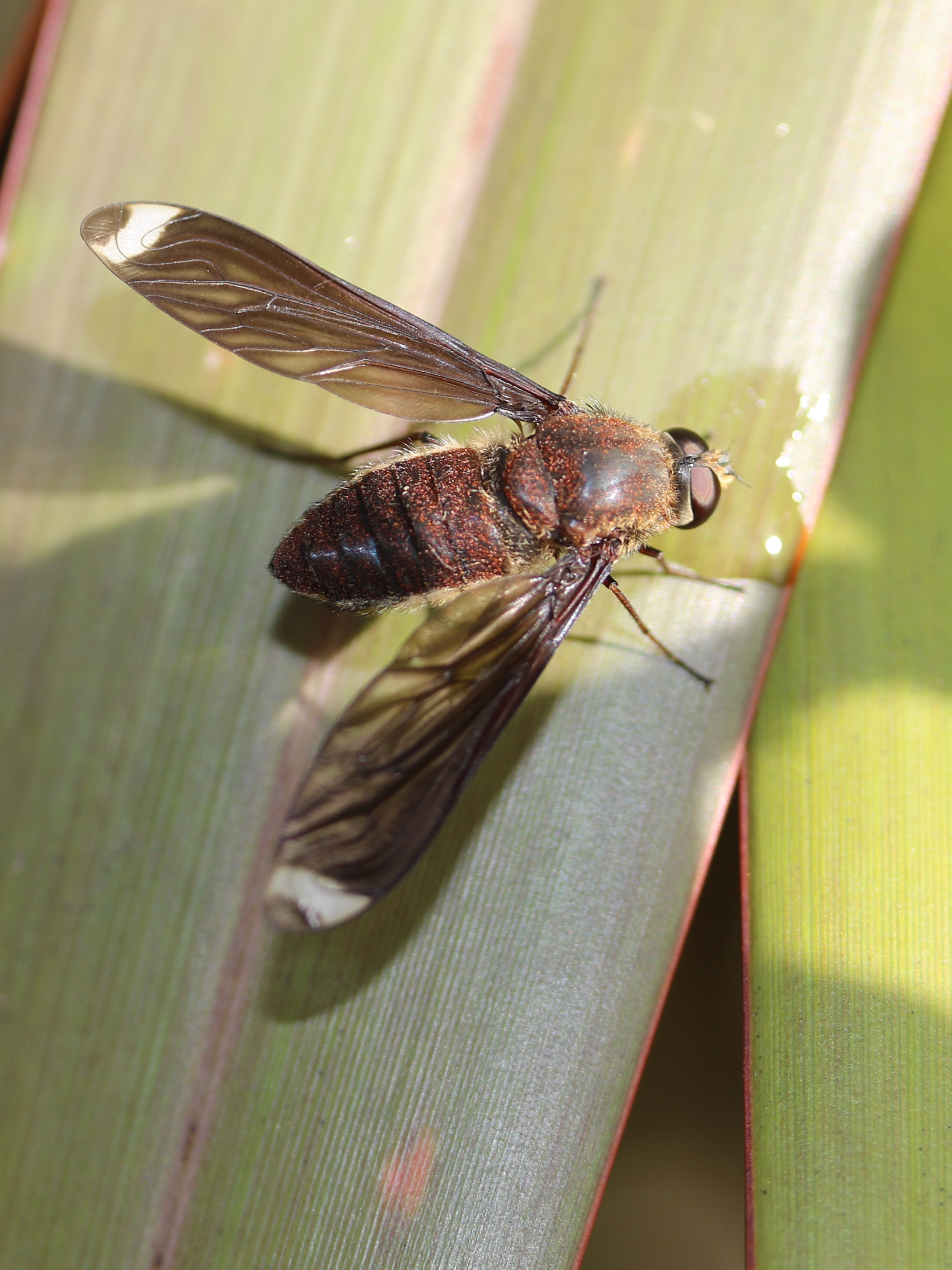

Scientific classification
- Kingdom: Animalia
- Phylum: Arthropoda
- Clade: Pancrustacea
- Class: Insecta
- Order: Diptera
- Family: Bombyliidae
- Genus: Comptosia
- Species: C. apicalis

Binomial name
- Comptosia apicalis Macquart, 1848

= Comptosia apicalis =

Australian species of insect

Comptosia apicalis is a species of bee flies in the family Bombyliidae.
