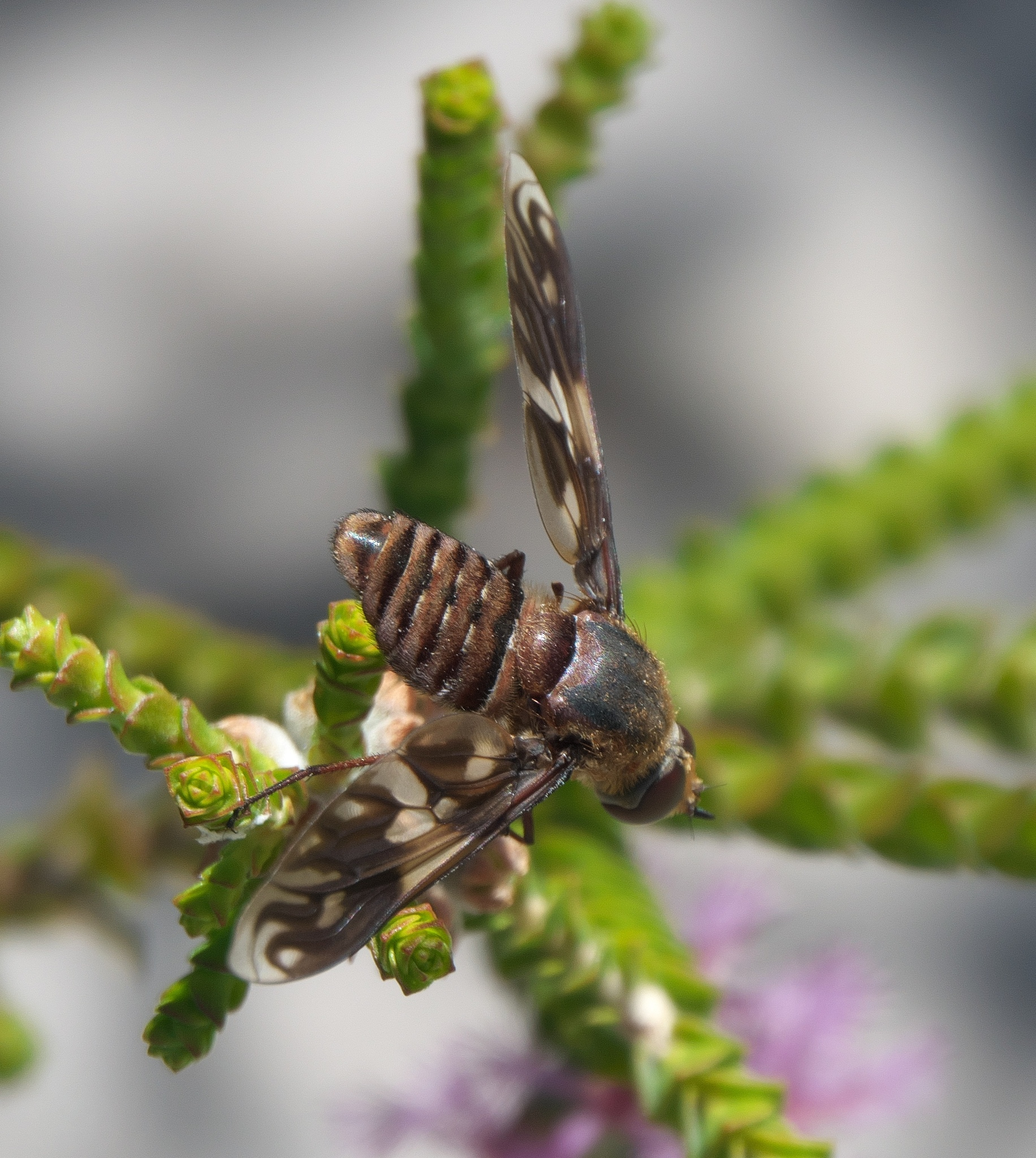
- Comptosia tendens, Australia

Scientific classification
- Kingdom: Animalia
- Phylum: Arthropoda
- Class: Insecta
- Order: Diptera
- Superfamily: Asiloidea
- Family: Bombyliidae
- Genus: Comptosia
- Species: C. tendens

Binomial name
- Comptosia tendens (Walker, 1849)

Synonyms
- Anthrax tendens Walker, 1849; Comptosia duofasciata Hull, 1973

= Comptosia tendens =

Species of flies

Comptosia tendens is a species of bee fly in the family Bombyliidae, found in Western Australia.
