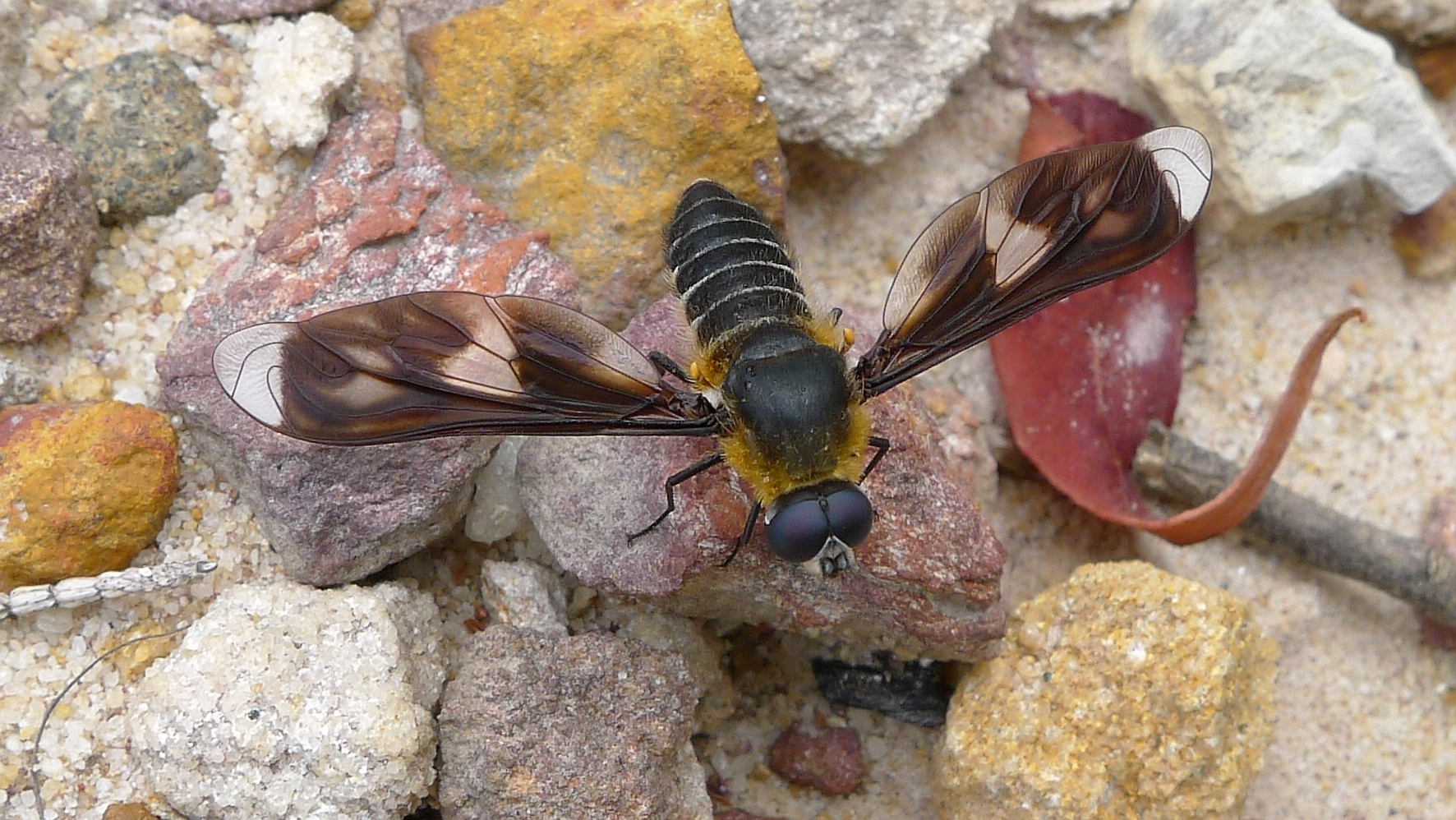

Scientific classification
- Kingdom: Animalia
- Phylum: Arthropoda
- Clade: Pancrustacea
- Class: Insecta
- Order: Diptera
- Family: Bombyliidae
- Genus: Comptosia
- Species: C. neobiguttata

Binomial name
- Comptosia neobiguttata Yeates, 1991

= Comptosia neobiguttata =

Australian species of insect

Comptosia neobiguttata is a species of bee flies in the family Bombyliidae, first described by David Keith Yeates in 1991.

It is found in the Australian Capital Territory, New South Wales, and Queensland.
