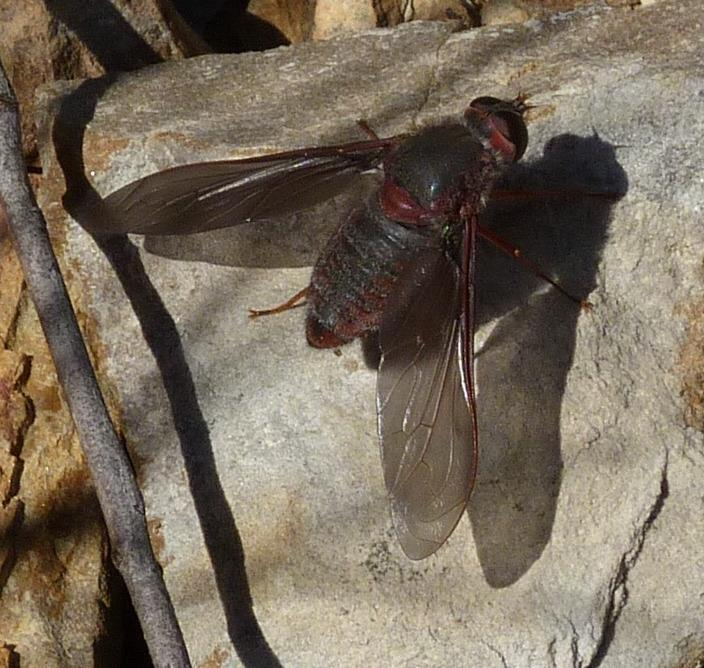

Scientific classification
- Kingdom: Animalia
- Phylum: Arthropoda
- Clade: Pancrustacea
- Class: Insecta
- Order: Diptera
- Family: Bombyliidae
- Genus: Comptosia
- Species: C. insignis

Binomial name
- Comptosia insignis Walker, 1849

= Comptosia insignis =

Australian species of insect

Comptosia insignis is a species of bee flies in the family Bombyliidae.
