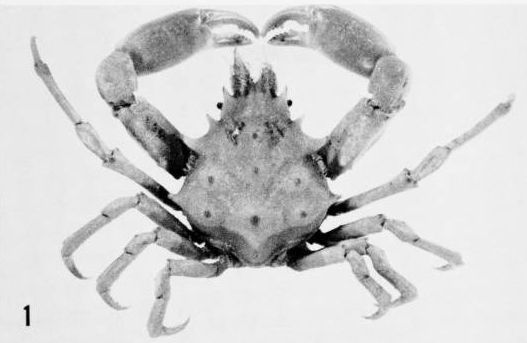

Scientific classification
- Kingdom: Animalia
- Phylum: Arthropoda
- Clade: Pancrustacea
- Class: Malacostraca
- Order: Decapoda
- Suborder: Pleocyemata
- Infraorder: Brachyura
- Family: Epialtidae
- Genus: Pugettia
- Species: P. richii

Binomial name
- Pugettia richii Dana, 1851

= Pugettia richii =

Species of crab

Pugettia richii, commonly known as cryptic kelp crab, is a species of small crab in the family Epialtidae. It lives among forests of kelp on the Pacific coast of North America. It can also be considered a decorator crab, often attaching small amounts of algae to its exoskeleton.

== Description ==
Pugettia richii is about 3–4 cm (1.2–1.6 in) in size, and has one sharp lateral tooth protruding from the front of its exoskeleton. The carapace is typically red and its chelae are bright blue near the end with orange, white or red tips. P. richii was found to be the most abundant of five observed spider crab species in a kelp forest off the coast of California, the species included in the study being Loxorhynchus crispatus, Pugettia producta, Mimulus foliatus, P. richii, and Scyra acutifrons. The crab is tiny and difficult to find, living on kelp and on benthic algal mats.

== Distribution ==
Pugettia richii is found in the rocky intertidal zone from Alaska to North Mexico. It is abundant in kelp forests and rocky reefs climbing the kelp at night. 300–2,100 crabs can be found on one kelp plant, with the numbers peaking at night. The males are typically higher up on the kelp and the females stay near the base of the plants. P. richii larvae were found to be very abundant off the coast of California. Larvae were present in 88.5% of samples taken. It is typically found on the algae Cystoseira and in coralline algal mats.

== Behavior ==
Pugettia richii is very good at camouflage, as it is a decorator crab. However, it also has the ability to change its color to match different algal growths nearby. Consistent with other crabs in the genus, P. richii typically only decorates its rostrum. It feeds on muscles, clams, barnacles and other hard shelled prey, as well as detritus and drift kelp.

== Predators ==
This kelp crab is often preyed on by sea otters. The slow moving kelp crab is easily picked up by the sea otters. The kelp crab's only real defense is its camouflage.

== Threats ==
In recent time it is being shown that marine reserves are actually harming these crabs. The reserves are increasing the population of predators resulting in an increase in P. richii mortality of about seven times greater than outside of the reserves.
