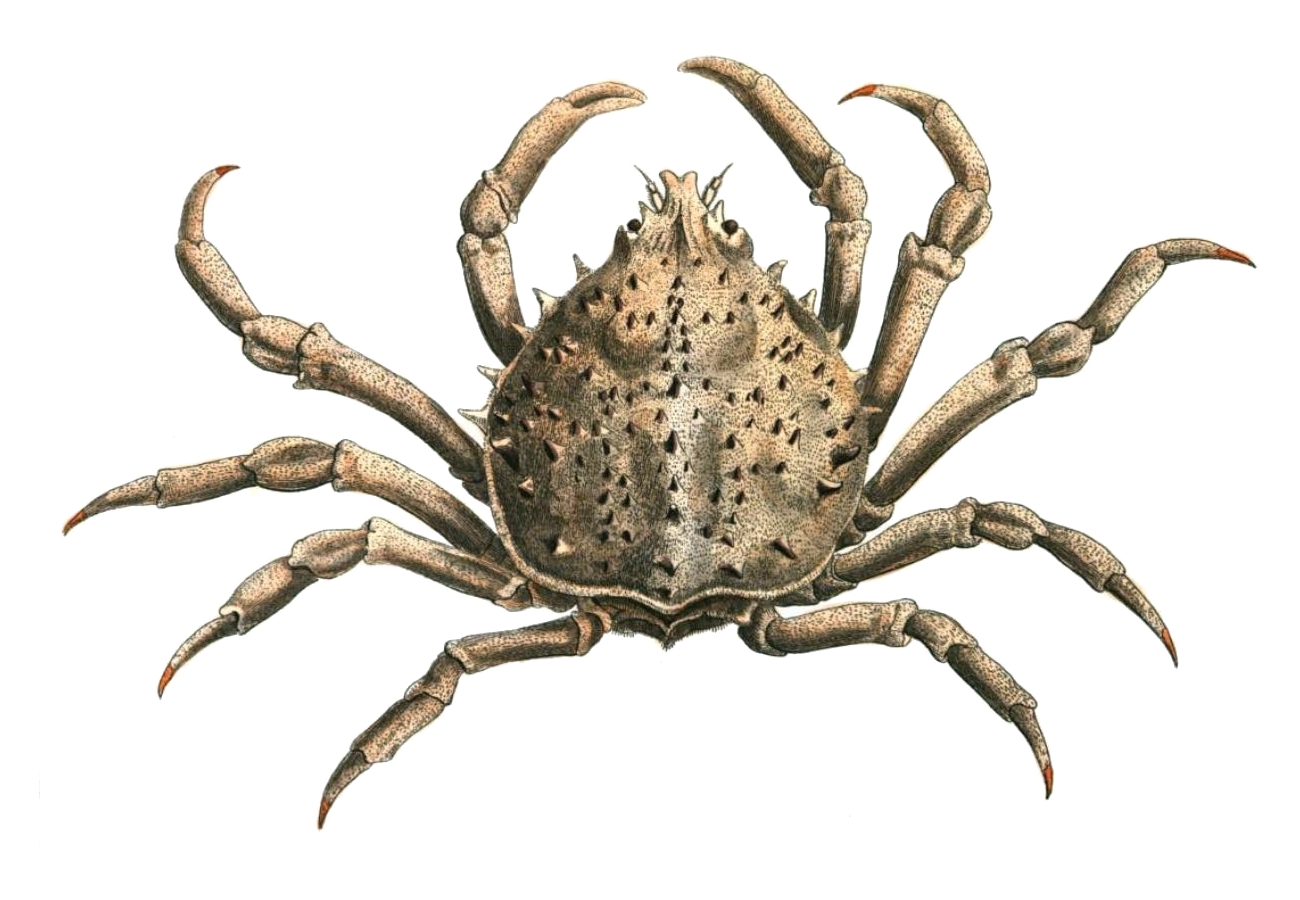
- Libinia emarginata

Scientific classification
- Kingdom: Animalia
- Phylum: Arthropoda
- Class: Malacostraca
- Order: Decapoda
- Suborder: Pleocyemata
- Infraorder: Brachyura
- Family: Epialtidae
- Subfamily: Pisinae; Dana, 1851

= Pisinae =

Subfamily of crabs

Pisinae is a subfamily of crabs in the family Epialtidae, comprising the following genera:

- Acanthophrys A. Milne-Edwards, 1865
- Anamathia Smith, 1885
- Apias Rathbun, 1897
- Apiomithrax Rathbun, 1897
- Austrolibinia Griffin, 1966
- Chorilia Dana, 1851
- Chorilibinia Lockington, 1877
- Chorinus Latreille, 1825
- Delsolaria Garth, 1973
- Doclea Leach, 1815
- Garthinia Richer de Forges & Ng, 2009
- Giranauria Griffin & Tranter, 1986
- Goniopugettia Sakai, 1986
- Guinotinia Richer de Forges & Ng, 2009
- Herbstia H. Milne-Edwards, 1834
- Holoplites Rathbun, 1894
- Hoplophrys Henderson, 1893
- Hoploplites Rathbun, 1894
- Hyastenus White, 1847
- Lahaina Dana, 1851
- Laubierinia Richer de Forges & Ng, 2009
- Lepidonaxia Targioni-Tozzetti, 1872
- Lepteces Rathbun, 1893
- Leptomaia Griffin & Tranter, 1986
- Libidoclaea H. Milne-Edwards & Lucas, 1842
- Libinia Leach, 1815
- Lissa Leach, 1815
- Loxorhynchus Stimpson, 1857
- Lyramaia Griffin & Tranter, 1986
- Micippoides A. Milne-Edwards, 1873
- Microlissa Pretzmann, 1961
- Micropisa Stimpson, 1858
- Nasutocarcinus Tavares, 1991
- Naxioides A. Milne-Edwards, 1865
- Neodoclea Buitendijk, 1950
- Nibilia A. Milne-Edwards, 1878
- Nicoya Wicksten, 1987
- Notolopas Stimpson, 1871
- Oplopisa A. Milne-Edwards, 1879
- Oxypleurodon Miers, 1886
- Pelia Bell, 1835
- Phalangipus Latreille, 1828
- Pisa Leach, 1814
- Pisoides H. Milne-Edwards & Lucas, 1843
- Rhinocarcinus Richer de Forges & Ng, 2009
- Rochinia A. Milne-Edwards, 1875
- Scyra Dana, 1852
- Sphenocarcinus A. Milne-Edwards, 1875
- Stegopleurodon Richer de Forges & Ng, 2009
- Thusaenys Griffin & Tranter, 1986
- Trachymaia A. Milne-Edwards, 1880
- Tylocarcinus Miers, 1879
