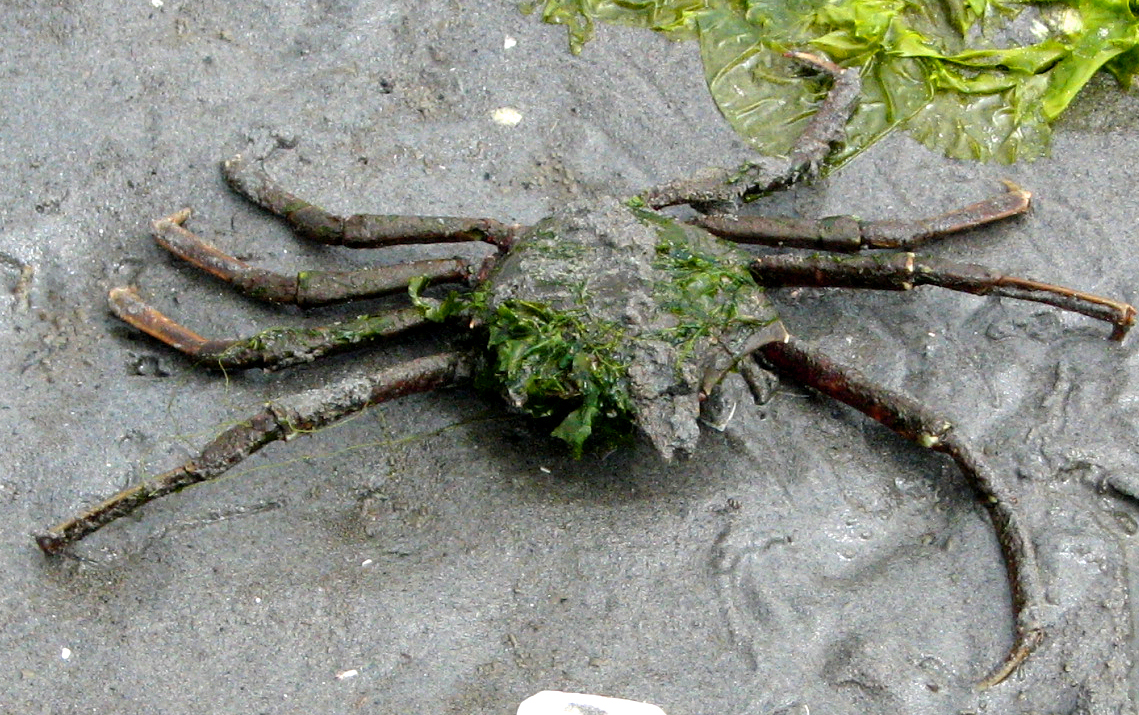
- Pugettia producta (Northern kelp crab), with first pereiopods missing

Scientific classification
- Domain: Eukaryota
- Kingdom: Animalia
- Phylum: Arthropoda
- Class: Malacostraca
- Order: Decapoda
- Suborder: Pleocyemata
- Infraorder: Brachyura
- Family: Epialtidae
- Subfamily: Epialtinae; MacLeay, 1838

Genera
- See text

= Epialtinae =

Subfamily of crustaceans

Epialtinae is a subfamily of crabs, containing the following genera:

- Acanthonyx Latreille, 1828
- Alfredalcockia Števčić, 2005
- Antilibinia MacLeay, 1838
- Cyclonyx Miers, 1879
- Epialtoides Garth, 1958
- Epialtus H. Milne-Edwards, 1834
- Esopus A. Milne-Edwards, 1875
- Eupleurodon Stimpson, 1871
- Goniothorax A. Milne-Edwards, 1878
- Griffinia Richer de Forges, 1994
- Huenia De Haan, 1837
- Leucippa H. Milne-Edwards, 1833
- Lophorochinia Garth, 1969
- Menaethiops Alcock, 1895
- Menaethius A. Milne-Edwards, 1834
- Mimulus Stimpson, 1860
- Mocosa Stimpson, 1871
- Perinia Dana, 1851
- Pugettia Dana, 1851
- Sargassocarcinus Ward, 1936
- Simocarcinus Miers, 1879
- Taliepus A. Milne-Edwards, 1878
- Xenocarcinus White, 1847

== Incertae sedis ==
- Acanthonyx elongatus White, 1847 (nomen nudum)
- Huenia dehaanii White, 1848
- Huenia proteus var. tenuipes Adams & White, 1848
- Inachus australis Gray, 1831
- Menaethius brevirostris Heller, 1862
