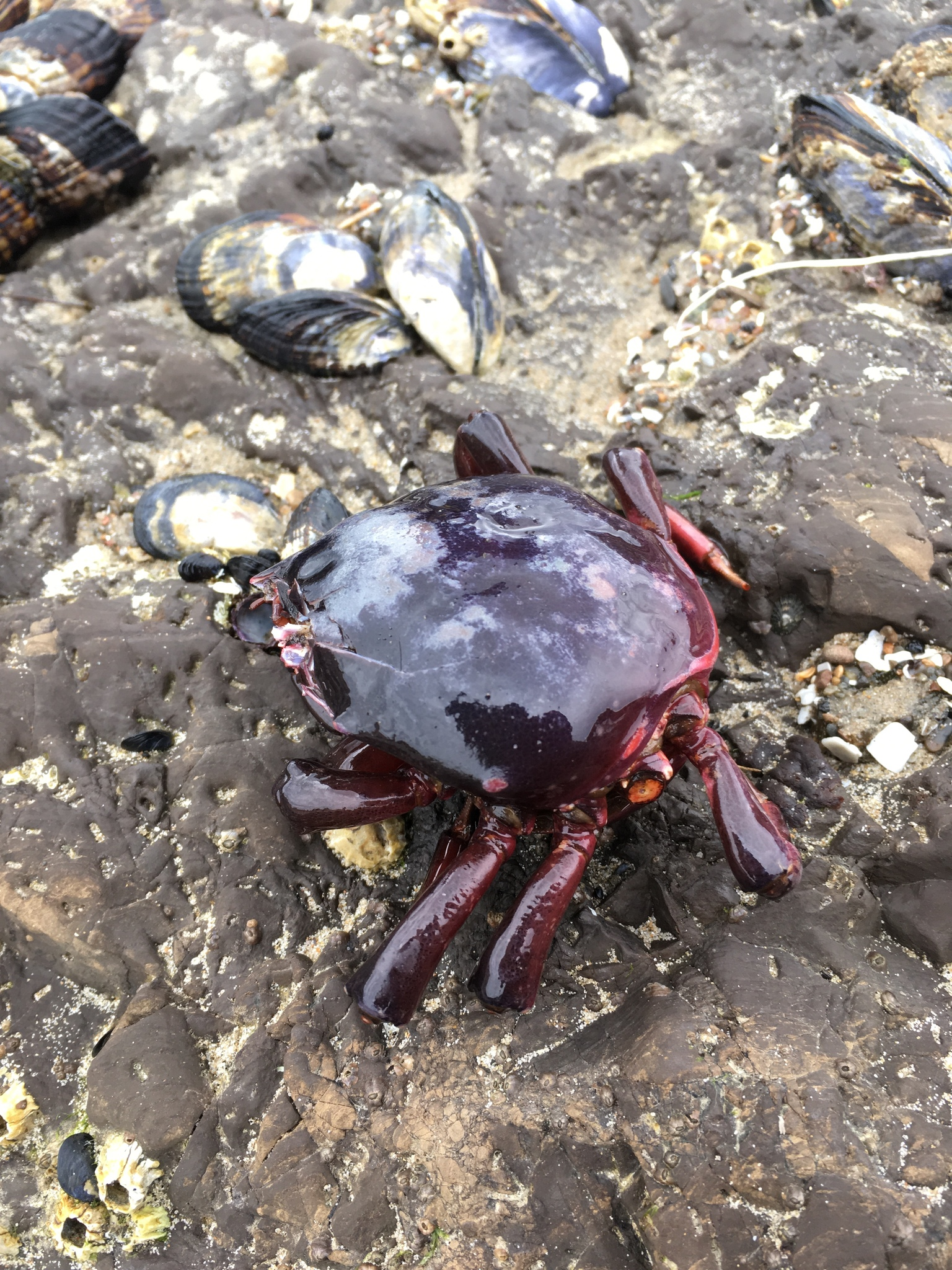
- Taliepus nuttallii

Scientific classification
- Domain: Eukaryota
- Kingdom: Animalia
- Phylum: Arthropoda
- Class: Malacostraca
- Order: Decapoda
- Suborder: Pleocyemata
- Infraorder: Brachyura
- Family: Epialtidae
- Subfamily: Epialtinae
- Genus: Taliepus; A. Milne-Edwards, 1897

= Taliepus =

Genus of crabs

Taliepus is a genus of kelp and spider crabs in the family Epialtidae. There are at least three described species in the genus Taliepus.

== Species ==
These three species belong to the genus Taliepus:

- Taliepus dentatus (H. Milne Edwards, 1834)^{c g}
- Taliepus marginatus (Bell, 1835)^{c g}
- Taliepus nuttallii (J. W. Randall, 1840)^{i c g b} (southern kelp crab)

Data sources: i = ITIS, c = Catalogue of Life, g = GBIF, b = Bugguide.net
