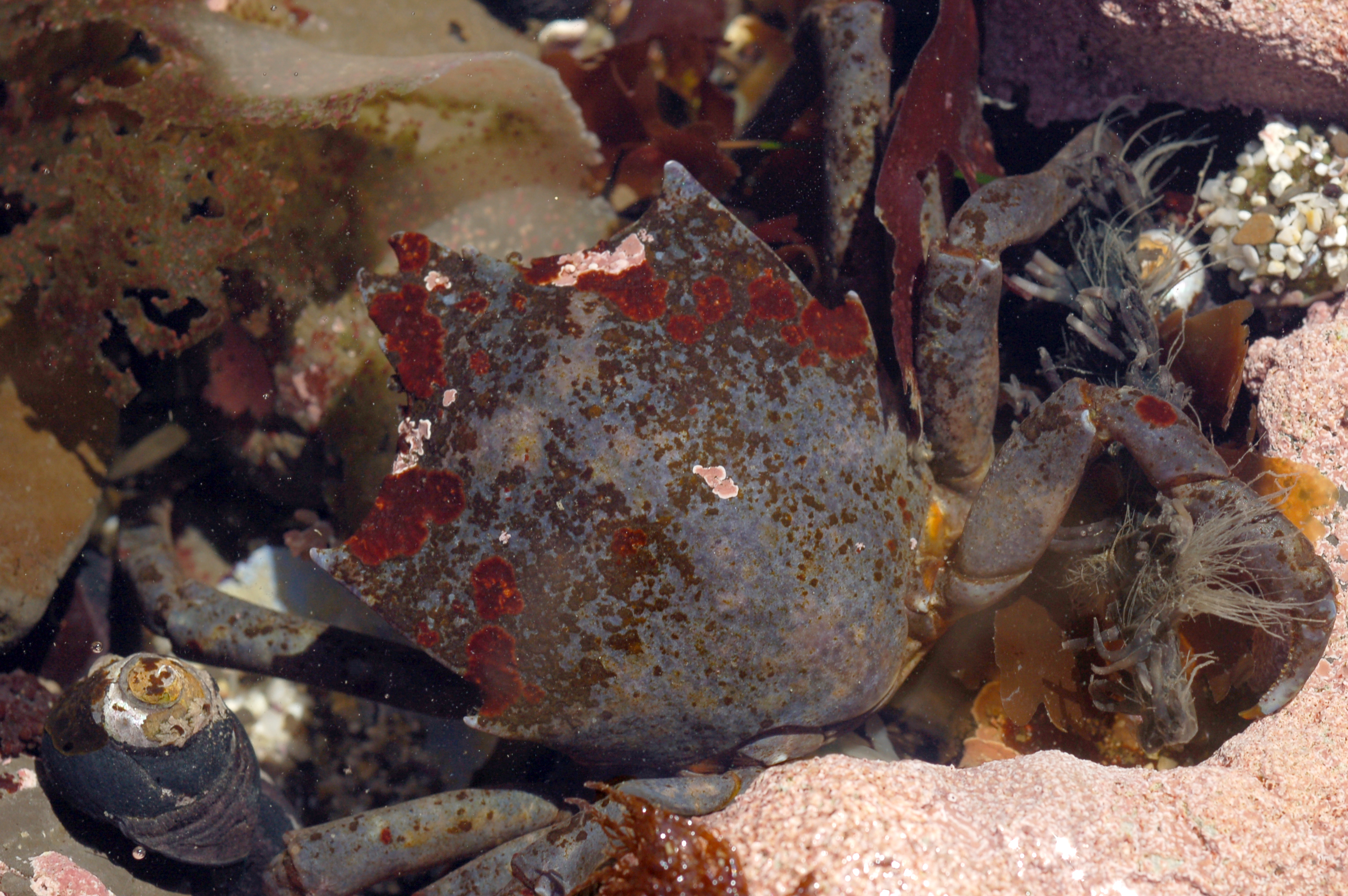
- Northern kelp crab (Pugettia producta)

Scientific classification
- Kingdom: Animalia
- Phylum: Arthropoda
- Clade: Pancrustacea
- Class: Malacostraca
- Order: Decapoda
- Suborder: Pleocyemata
- Infraorder: Brachyura
- Family: Epialtidae
- Subfamily: Epialtinae
- Genus: Pugettia; Dana, 1851

Type species
- Pugettia gracilis Dana, 1851

= Pugettia =

Genus of crabs

Pugettia is a genus of kelp crabs in the family Epialtidae. It comprises the following species:

- Pugettia dalli Rathbun, 1894 – spined kelp crab
- Pugettia elongata Yokoya, 1933
- Pugettia foliata (Stimpson, 1860)
- Pugettia gracilis Dana, 1851 – graceful kelp crab
- Pugettia hubbsi Garth, 1958
- Pugettia incisa (De Haan, 1839)
- Pugettia intermedia Sakai, 1938
- Pugettia leytensis Rathbun, 1916
- Pugettia longipes Ohtsuchi, Komatsu & X Li, 2020
- Pugettia marissinica Takeda & Miyake, 1972
- Pugettia mindanaoensis Rathbun, 1916
- Pugettia minor Ortmann, 1893
- Pugettia nipponensis Rathbun, 1932
- Pugettia ogasawaraensis Komatsu, 2011
- Pugettia pellucens Rathbun, 1932
- Pugettia producta (Randall, 1840) – northern kelp crab or shield-backed kelp crab
- Pugettia richii Dana, 1851 – cryptic kelp crab
- Pugettia similis Rathbun, 1932
- Pugettia tasmanensis Richer de Forges, 1993
- Pugettia venetiae Rathbun, 1924 – Venice kelp crab
- Pugettia vesicularis (Rathbun, 1907)
- Pugettia vulgaris Ohtsuchi, Kawamura & Takeda, 2014
- †Pugettia yamafui Karasawa & Kitamura, 2003
