= Libinia ferreirae =

Scientific classification
- Kingdom: Animalia
- Phylum: Arthropoda
- Clade: Pancrustacea
- Class: Malacostraca
- Order: Decapoda
- Suborder: Pleocyemata
- Infraorder: Brachyura
- Family: Epialtidae
- Genus: Libinia
- Species: L. ferreirae

Binomial name
- Libinia ferreirae Brito Capello, 1871

Synonyms
- L. gibbosa A. Milne-Edwards, 1878

Species of crab

Libinia ferreirae is a species of tropical spider crab in the family Epialtidae. It is found on the seabed in shallow waters off the Atlantic coast of South America.

== Description ==
Like other spider crabs, Libinia ferreirae has a roughly circular spiny carapace that extends forwards into a rostrum between the two, stalked eyes. It has five pairs of walking limbs.

== Distribution ==
Libinia ferreirae is found off the Atlantic coast of South America in the intertidal zone and at depths down to about 35 metres (115 ft). The range extends from Venezuela and the Guianas, through parts of Brazil to Uruguay.

== Biology ==
The larvae of Libinia ferreirae are planktonic and have one prezoeal stage, two zoeal stages and one megalopa stage. The carapace of the zoea has one short rostral and one curved dorsal spine and some of the abdominal segments have spiny projections. The post-larval megalopa has a downturned rostrum, a carapace with various protuberances and four pairs of abdominal appendages.

== Ecology ==
Libinia ferreirae is often found in association with the jellyfish, Lychnorhiza lucerna. Juvenile crabs are found living within the bell, on the oral arms or clinging to the exterior, even on jellies that have been stranded on the shore. The crabs are mostly less than 3 centimetres (1.2 in) in diameter and probably colonized the jellyfish when they were larvae. The number of jellyfish acting as host is low but increases with the size of the jellyfish and the inhabited ones mostly house a single crab. The crab may be immune to or able to tolerate the jellyfish stings. It is thought that the crab benefits from using the jellyfish as a nursery because free-living, young crabs are eaten by predatory fish. Other benefits of this arrangement to the crab are a potential increase in food supply and transport to new locations. There do not seem to be any benefits to the jellyfish and the arrangement may be deleterious to it if the crab nibbles its interior tissues, as happens in some other crab/jellyfish relationships. At some stage the crab emerges from the bell and falls to the sea bed.

Adult Libinia ferreirae often have faunal epibionts growing on their carapace. These include algae, polychaete worms, sea anemones, barnacles, bryozoans and hydroids. The most common species growing on the carapace was the sea anemone, Calliactis tricolor, which seems to be used by the crabs as camouflage. Bryozoans colonised the legs as well as the carapace.
