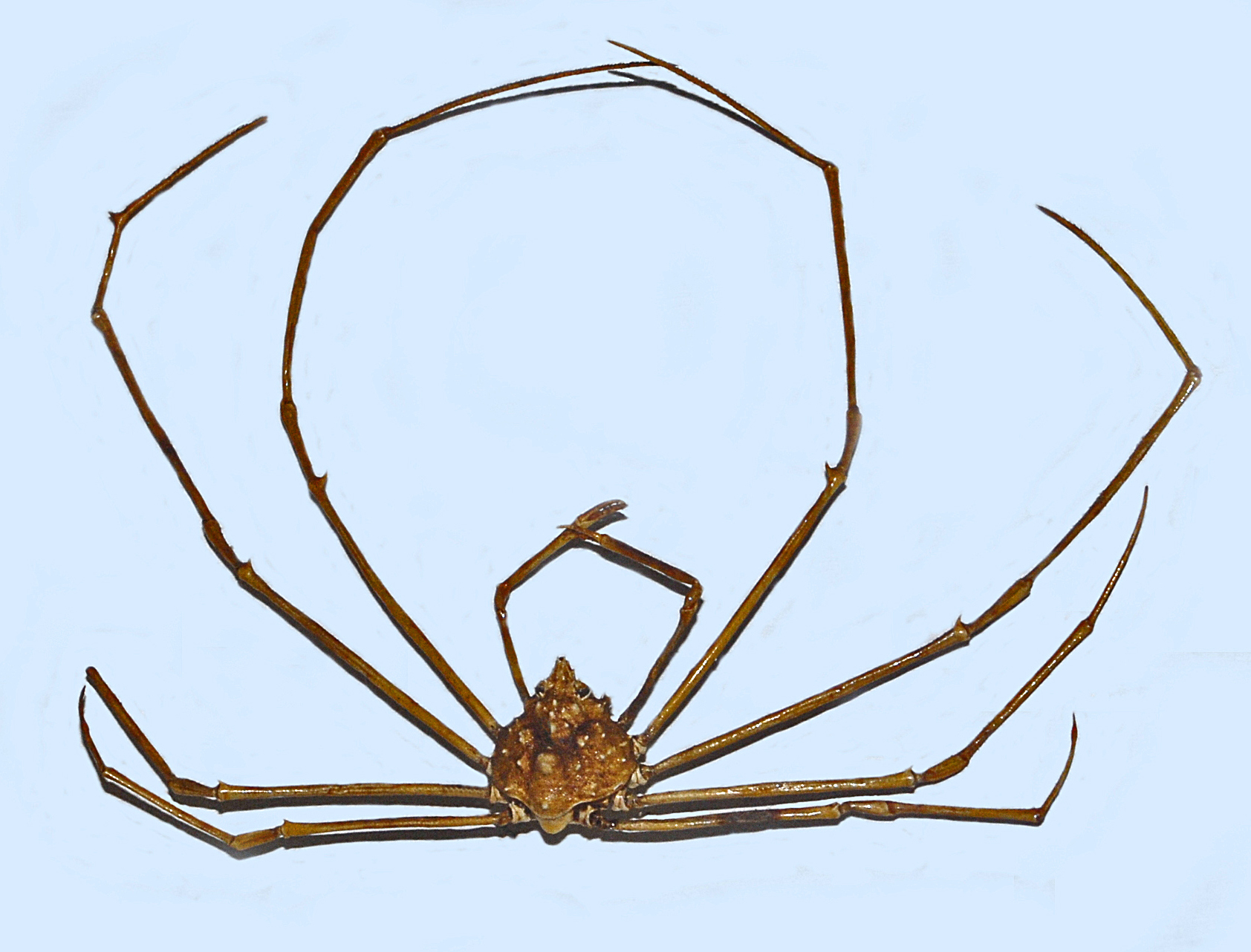
- Phalangipus longipes

Scientific classification
- Kingdom: Animalia
- Phylum: Arthropoda
- Class: Malacostraca
- Order: Decapoda
- Suborder: Pleocyemata
- Infraorder: Brachyura
- Family: Epialtidae
- Genus: Phalangipus
- Species: P. longipes

Binomial name
- Phalangipus longipes (Linnaeus, 1758)

Synonyms
- Cancer arachnoides Linnaeus, 1758; Cancer lar Fabricius, 1793; Cancer longipes Linnaeus, 1758

= Phalangipus longipes =

Species of crab

Phalangipus longipes is a species of crabs in the family Epialtidae.

== Description ==
The carapace of Phalangipus longipes is nearly as broad as long and can reach a length of one inch. The chelopoda are large and robust. Ambulatory legs are cylindrical, smooth, very long and slender. The first pair of leg is the longest, about six times of the length of the carapace. Body is light reddish above, mottled with white. Below it is white, with whitish feet, annulated with red.

The barnacles of the species Sacculina granulosa are parasitic castrators of these crabs.

== Distribution ==
This species is present in Northeastern and northern Australia, Indian Ocean, Sri Lanka, Andaman Sea, west Malay Peninsula, Strait of Malacca, China, Hong Kong, Taiwan, Singapore, Gulf of Thailand, Philippines and Indonesia.
