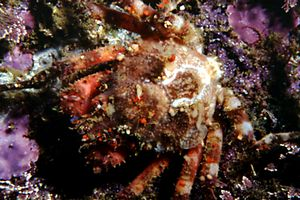
- Herbstia condyliata

Scientific classification
- Kingdom: Animalia
- Phylum: Arthropoda
- Class: Malacostraca
- Order: Decapoda
- Suborder: Pleocyemata
- Infraorder: Brachyura
- Family: Epialtidae
- Subfamily: Pisinae
- Genus: Herbstia (crab); H. Milne-Edwards, 1834

Type species
- Cancer condyliatus Fabricius, 1787

= Herbstia (crab) =

Genus of crabs

Herbstia is a genus of crabs, containing the following eleven species:

- Herbstia camptacantha (Stimpson, 1871)
- Herbstia condyliata (Fabricius, 1787)
- Herbstia crassipes (H. Milne-Edwards, 1873)
- Herbstia depressa Stimpson, 1860
- Herbstia edwardsii Bell, 1835
- Herbstia nitida Manning & Holthuis, 1981
- Herbstia parvifrons Randall, 1840
- Herbstia pubescens Stimpson, 1871
- Herbstia pyriformis (Bell, 1835)
- Herbstia rubra A. Milne-Edwards, 1869
- Herbstia tumida (Stimpson, 1871)
