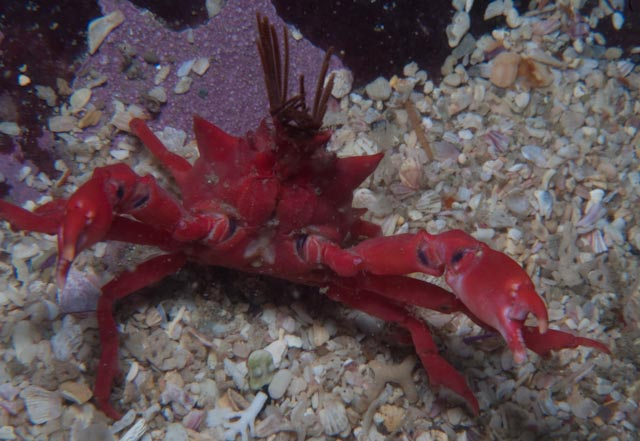

Scientific classification
- Kingdom: Animalia
- Phylum: Arthropoda
- Clade: Pancrustacea
- Class: Malacostraca
- Order: Decapoda
- Suborder: Pleocyemata
- Infraorder: Brachyura
- Family: Epialtidae
- Genus: Acanthonyx
- Species: A. dentatus

Binomial name
- Acanthonyx dentatus H. Milne-Edwards, 1834

Synonyms
- Dehaanius acanthopus MacLeay, 1838; Dehaanius dentatus (Milne Edwards, 1834)

= Acanthonyx dentatus =

Species of crab

Acanthonyx dentatus, the toothed decorator crab, is a species of crab in the family Epialtidae.

== Distribution ==
The toothed decorator crab is known around the southern African coast from Cape Columbine to Richards Bay subtidally to 43 metres (141 ft). It is also known from the Red Sea.

== Description ==
The toothed decorator crab may grow to 40 millimetres (1.6 in) across. It is usually a well camouflaged crab, decorating its carapace with hydroids and seaweeds, offering camouflage and also defence, since hydroids sting and many seaweeds are chemically noxious. Its carapace is teardrop-shaped with two sharp spines projecting forwards between its eyes. There are two marginal spines on its carapace. It has stubby legs. It is a vivid pink-red to a dull brown in colour.

== Ecology ==
Vividly coloured when recently moulted, these animals are commonly found taking refuge among groups of striped anemones. The crabs use the anemones' habit of shooting sticky defensive threads through their body walls for their own defence.
