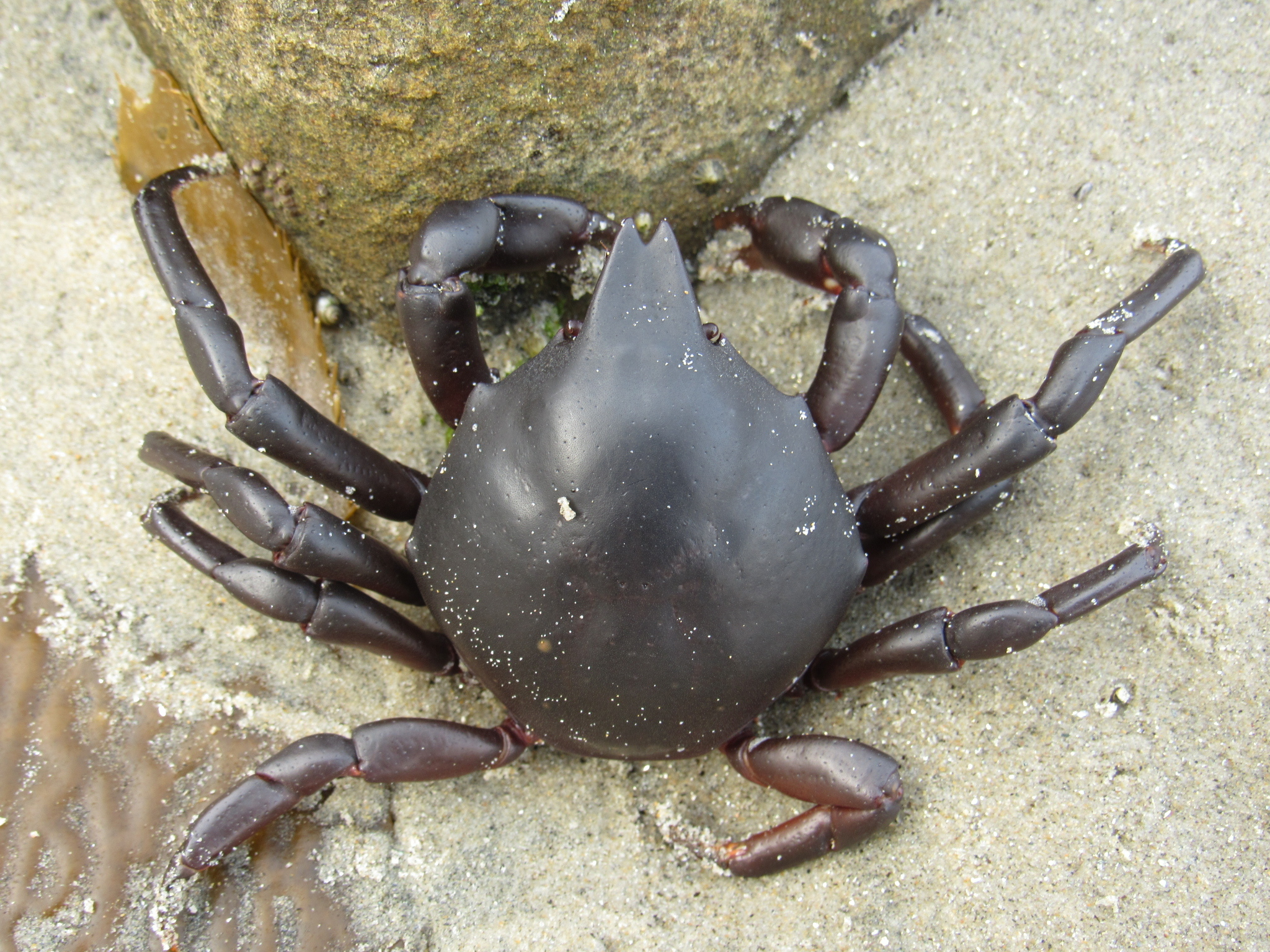

Scientific classification
- Kingdom: Animalia
- Phylum: Arthropoda
- Class: Malacostraca
- Order: Decapoda
- Suborder: Pleocyemata
- Infraorder: Brachyura
- Family: Epialtidae
- Genus: Taliepus
- Species: T. nuttallii

Binomial name
- Taliepus nuttallii (J. W. Randall, 1840)

= Taliepus nuttallii =

Species of crab

Taliepus nuttallii, known generally as the southern kelp crab or globose kelp crab, is a species of true crab in the family Epialtidae. It is found in the East Pacific.
