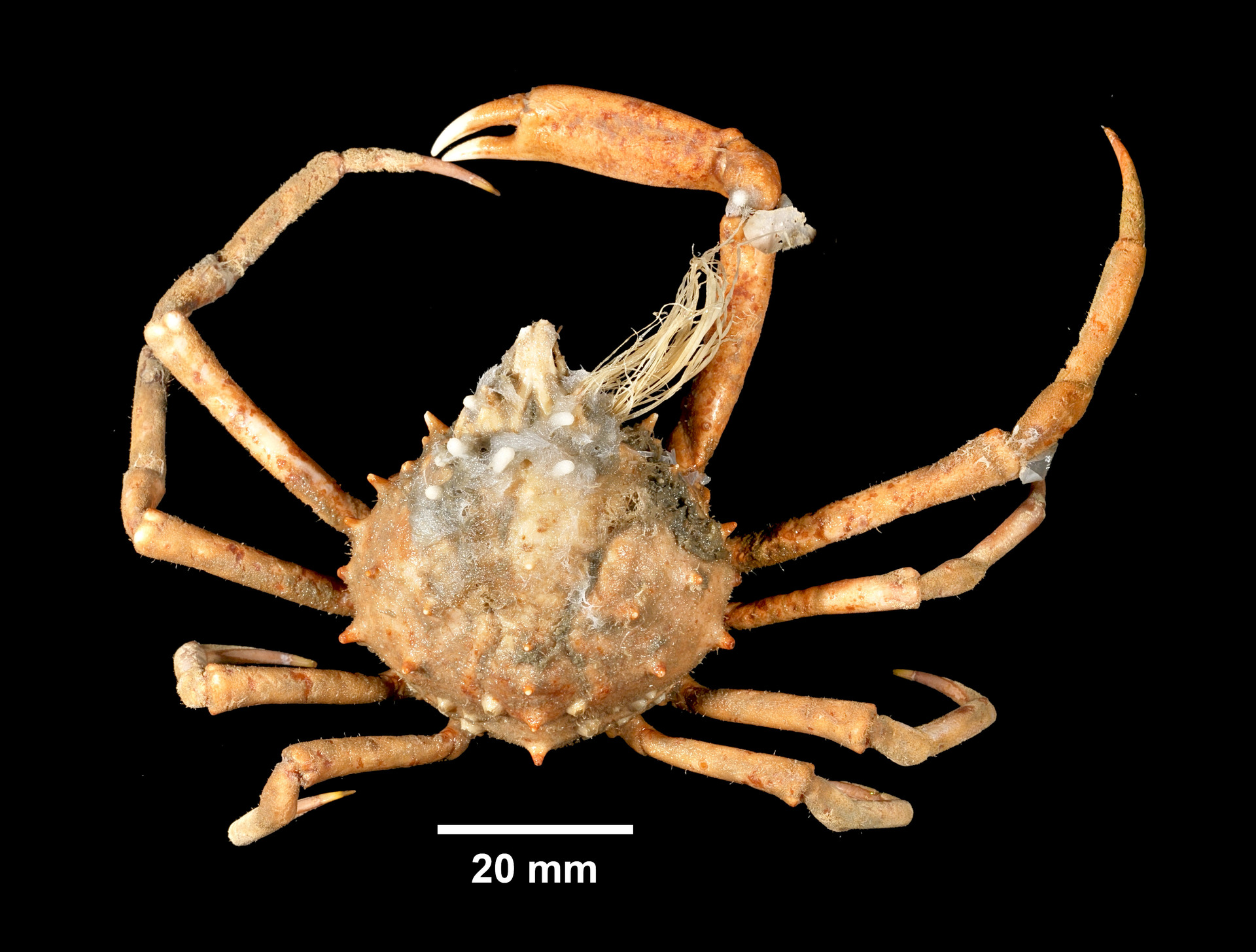

Scientific classification
- Kingdom: Animalia
- Phylum: Arthropoda
- Clade: Pancrustacea
- Class: Malacostraca
- Order: Decapoda
- Suborder: Pleocyemata
- Infraorder: Brachyura
- Family: Epialtidae
- Genus: Libinia
- Species: L. dubia

Binomial name
- Libinia dubia H. Milne-Edwards, 1834

= Libinia dubia =

Species of crab

Libinia dubia, the longnose spider crab, is a species of crab in the family Epialtidae. It is found in shallow waters on the eastern coast of North America.

== Description ==
The carapace of the longnose spider crab is nearly circular in outline. The shell grows to an average diameter of 6 to 10 centimetres (2.4 to 3.9 in) with the males being larger than the females. There are about six spiny protuberances on each edge of the shell and another six down the midline. The upper surface is covered with short setae (bristles) which are hooked and resemble velcro. To these the crab sticks pieces of seaweed and other organisms as camouflage. There are two small stalked eyes and between these the carapace extends forward in a forked rostrum. There are five pairs of long, thin, jointed walking legs. The front pair end in rather small pincers and the terminal joint of the others legs is a curved claw. The longnose spider crab may be confused with the portly spider crab, Libinia emarginata, but that species usually has nine spines on the margin at each side of the shell.

== Distribution ==
The longnose spider crab is found on the eastern seaboard of the United States at depths down to about 50 metres (160 ft). The range is from Cape Cod to southern Texas, including Cuba and the Bahamas. In the Indian River Lagoon, adults are found on sandy bottoms and juveniles in seagrass meadows. In the late 1900s this crab was identified off the coast of Tunisia, but by what means it had managed to cross the Atlantic Ocean is unclear.

== Reproduction ==
When breeding, the male transfers bundles of sperm called spermatophores to the female. Fertilisation is internal and afterwards the female broods the eggs under her abdomen until they hatch. The larvae then become part of the zooplankton, having two zoeal stages and one megalopal or post-larval stage. After that the larvae settle on the sea bed and undergo metamorphosis into juvenile crabs.

== Ecology ==
The longnose spider crab is a scavenger and detritivore. In seagrass meadows it eats the seaweeds that grow there. It is eaten by predatory fish such as the pinfish (Lagodon rhomboides), the gag grouper (Mycteroperca microlepis) and the oyster toadfish (Opsanus tau). It attempts to avoid being eaten by sticking unpalatable seaweeds and invertebrates onto its carapace. These include the brown alga, Dictyota menstrualis and the sun sponge (Hymeniacidon heliophila). Along the East Coast of the US, where Dictyota menstrualis is present, these crabs recognize and preferentially select this chemically noxious algae. However, in places where the D. menstrualis is absent, L. dubia has an alternative camouflage method and does not appear to recognize the D. menstrualis. As it grows larger it no longer needs to disguise itself in this way because its shell is too large for the predators to ingest. It is sometimes associated with the loggerhead turtle (Caretta caretta), living as an epibiont on its carapace.

Longnose spider crabs are often found living inside the bells of cannonball jellies, Stomolophus meleagris. It is thought they gain access as juveniles when the jellyfish happens to drift near the seabed or possibly they may metamorphosise from larvae directly inside the bell. It may be a symbiotic relationship with the crabs gaining protection from predators and obtaining food from their hosts but any benefit to the jellyfish is unclear, especially as its tissues may be nibbled.
