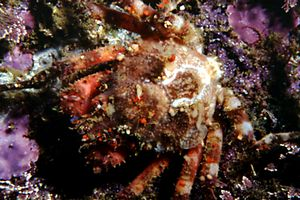

Scientific classification
- Kingdom: Animalia
- Phylum: Arthropoda
- Clade: Pancrustacea
- Class: Malacostraca
- Order: Decapoda
- Suborder: Pleocyemata
- Infraorder: Brachyura
- Family: Epialtidae
- Genus: Herbstia (crab)
- Species: H. condyliata

Binomial name
- Herbstia condyliata (Fabricius, 1787)

= Herbstia condyliata =

Species of crab

Herbstia condyliata is a species of crab in the family Epialtidae.

== Environment ==
Herbstia condyliata is a very widespread organism and can be found in a variety of places such as: the entire Mediterranean Sea and the western Atlantic from the North of the Gulf of Guinea to the Cantabrian Sea. It may also be found in the Canary Islands, Madeira, and Azores. Its habitat encompasses rocky and coralligenous bottoms and they may also dwell in caves. In caves they are found to dwell there during the day and leave at night time to forage.
