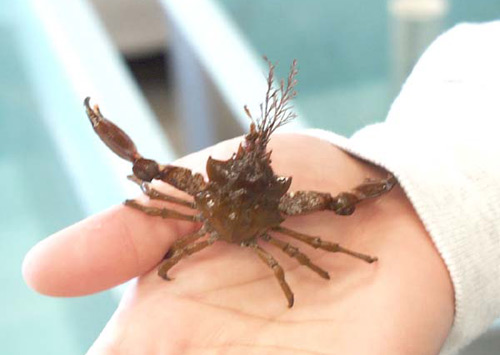

Scientific classification
- Kingdom: Animalia
- Phylum: Arthropoda
- Clade: Pancrustacea
- Class: Malacostraca
- Order: Decapoda
- Suborder: Pleocyemata
- Infraorder: Brachyura
- Family: Epialtidae
- Genus: Pugettia
- Species: P. gracilis

Binomial name
- Pugettia gracilis Dana, 1851

Synonyms
- Pugettia lordii Spence Bate, 1865

= Pugettia gracilis =

Species of crab

Pugettia gracilis, commonly known as the graceful kelp crab, is a species of small crab in the family Epialtidae. It lives among forests of kelp on the Pacific coast of North America.

== Description ==
The carapace (shell) of this small crab is slightly longer than it is wide and grows to a width of 4 cm (1.6 in) in males and 2.8 cm (1.1 in) in females. The rostrum (the part of the carapace in front of the eyes) has two flattened projections which spread apart. The margin of the carapace has a pair of large teeth on either side of the rostrum and another, more flattened pair, slightly further back. The carapace is scattered with small tubercles. The legs are long and bear spines which may help the crab cling onto the kelp. The colour of this crab varies, usually being brown, red or yellow, but sometimes being orange, pink, white or blue. The chelae (claws) have blue extremities, with red, orange or white tips, and the walking legs often have pale bands.

== Distribution and habitat ==
Pugettia gracilis is native to the west coast of North America, its range extending from the Aleutian Islands, off the coast of Alaska, to Monterey Bay in California. Its typical habitat is among the fronds of kelp, or among the stems of eelgrass, both on exposed coasts and in more sheltered locations. It can occur on pilings, even when there is strong water movement. Its depth range is from the low intertidal zone down to about 140 m (460 ft).

== Ecology ==
Pugettia gracilis relies on the kelp among which it lives for food and for protection from predators. It sometimes employs fragments of kelp as decoration, but not to the extent of the graceful decorator crab (Oregonia gracilis). It is at its most abundant in late summer, when the canopy of the kelp forest is at its maximum, but is generally found in the higher part of the kelp understory rather than the canopy. In the winter, the kelp dies back, the crab population declines and crabs may hide in rock crevices. Predators of this crab include fish, sea otters and octopuses. When mating, the male crab lies on his back while the female stands over and facing him. The female carries the batch of eggs she lays, which may number upwards of six thousand eggs, under her abdomen.
