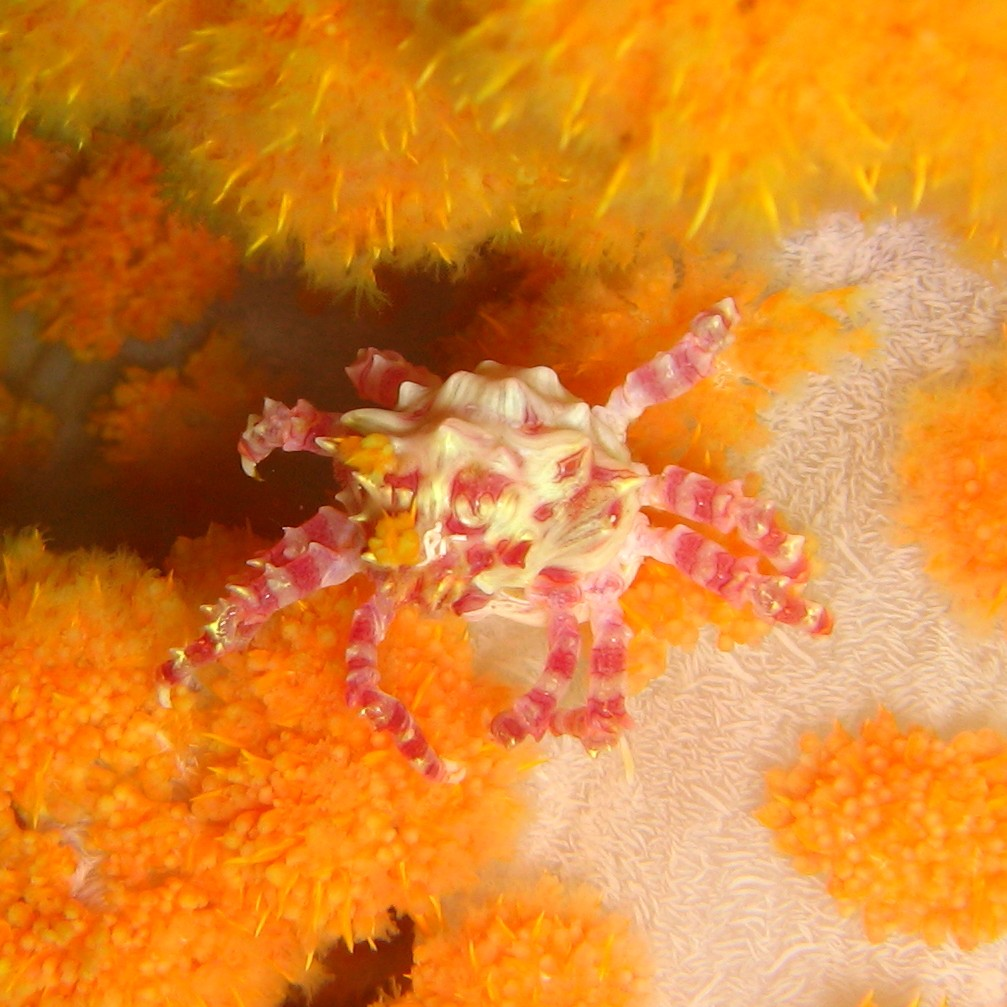

Scientific classification
- Kingdom: Animalia
- Phylum: Arthropoda
- Clade: Pancrustacea
- Class: Malacostraca
- Order: Decapoda
- Suborder: Pleocyemata
- Infraorder: Brachyura
- Superfamily: Majoidea
- Family: Epialtidae
- Subfamily: Pisinae
- Genus: Hoplophrys; Henderson, 1893
- Species: H. oatesii

Binomial name
- Hoplophrys oatesii Henderson, 1893

= Hoplophrys =

Hoplophrys oatesii

Genus of crabs

Hoplophrys is a monotypic genus of crab in the family Epialtidae. It contains the single species Hoplophrys oatesii, also known as the candy crab, Oates's soft coral crab, commensal soft coral crab and Dendronephthya crab.

== Description ==
Hoplophrys oatesii is a very colourful crab that grows from 1.5 to 2 cm (0.59 to 0.79 in). It lives on various species of soft coral in the genus Dendronephthya. It camouflages itself by mimicking the colours of the polyps among which it hides. It adds further camouflage by attaching polyps to its carapace. Colours vary depending on the colour of the coral, and may be white, pink, yellow or red.

The first pair of legs of this species has small claws. The body has pointed spines with a red and white pattern, similar in appearance to the host coral.

== Distribution and habitat ==
This crab is widespread in the Indo-Pacific in tropical climates. It is found in the benthic zone at depths of 1–90 metres (0–300 ft).

== Diet ==
Hoplophrys oatesii feeds on plankton.
