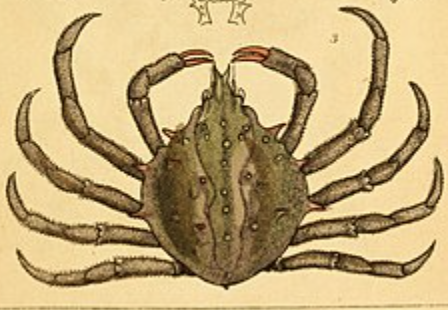

Scientific classification
- Kingdom: Animalia
- Phylum: Arthropoda
- Clade: Pancrustacea
- Class: Malacostraca
- Order: Decapoda
- Suborder: Pleocyemata
- Infraorder: Brachyura
- Family: Epialtidae
- Genus: Libinia
- Species: L. spinosa

Binomial name
- Libinia spinosa Milne Edwards, 1834

= Libinia spinosa =

Species of crustacean

Libinia spinosa is a majoid crab found in mud and sand bottoms of the Southwestern Atlantic and Pacific oceans. It is a generalist feeder on organisms such as algae, sponges, cnidarians, mollusks, polychaetes, crustaceans, and small fish. It commonly engages in a symbiotic relationship with the medusa Lychnorhiza lucerna.

== Description ==
Libinia spinosa is a member of the crab superfamily Majoidea which are commonly known as the spider crabs. The carapaces of this organism can measure up to 89 mm and its leg span can be up to 568 mm. The number of median spines of Libinia spinosa can vary, with 7 being the most common number, but Libinia spinosa with 5, 8, and 10 median spines are also seen commonly. Testes are visibly flat, transparent structures that are coiled anteriorly.

== Range and habitat ==
Libinia spinosa is commonly found at both mud and sand bottoms in the Southwestern Atlantic and Pacific oceans. It inhabits Southwestern Atlantic waters ranging from Nova Scotia to Argentina. In the Pacific Ocean, it is found off the coasts of the United States, Baja California, Galápagos Islands, Hawaii, Peru, and Chile. The depths at which this organism is found at range from the intertidal zone to 170 m. It prefers sediment that contains both silt and clay.

== Reproduction ==
Libinia spinosa engage in precopulatory courting using both olfactory and tactile cues, indirect sperm transfer is common. Females have been shown to exhibit sexual selection with their preference for larger males. The trait that has been shown to be most highly correlated with mate acquisition for males is large cheliped size. Males have been shown to exhibit mate guarding where they will maneuver their chelipeds around the female and fight off other males. Precopulatory mate guarding is exhibited significantly longer than postcopulatory mate guarding. Males breed with females by turning the female upside down and below them and subsequently inserting their gonopods into the female's gonophores. Male copulatory organs consist of a long first gonopod and a short stout second gonopod. Females produce 1-3 offspring for each breeding season.

== Life cycle ==
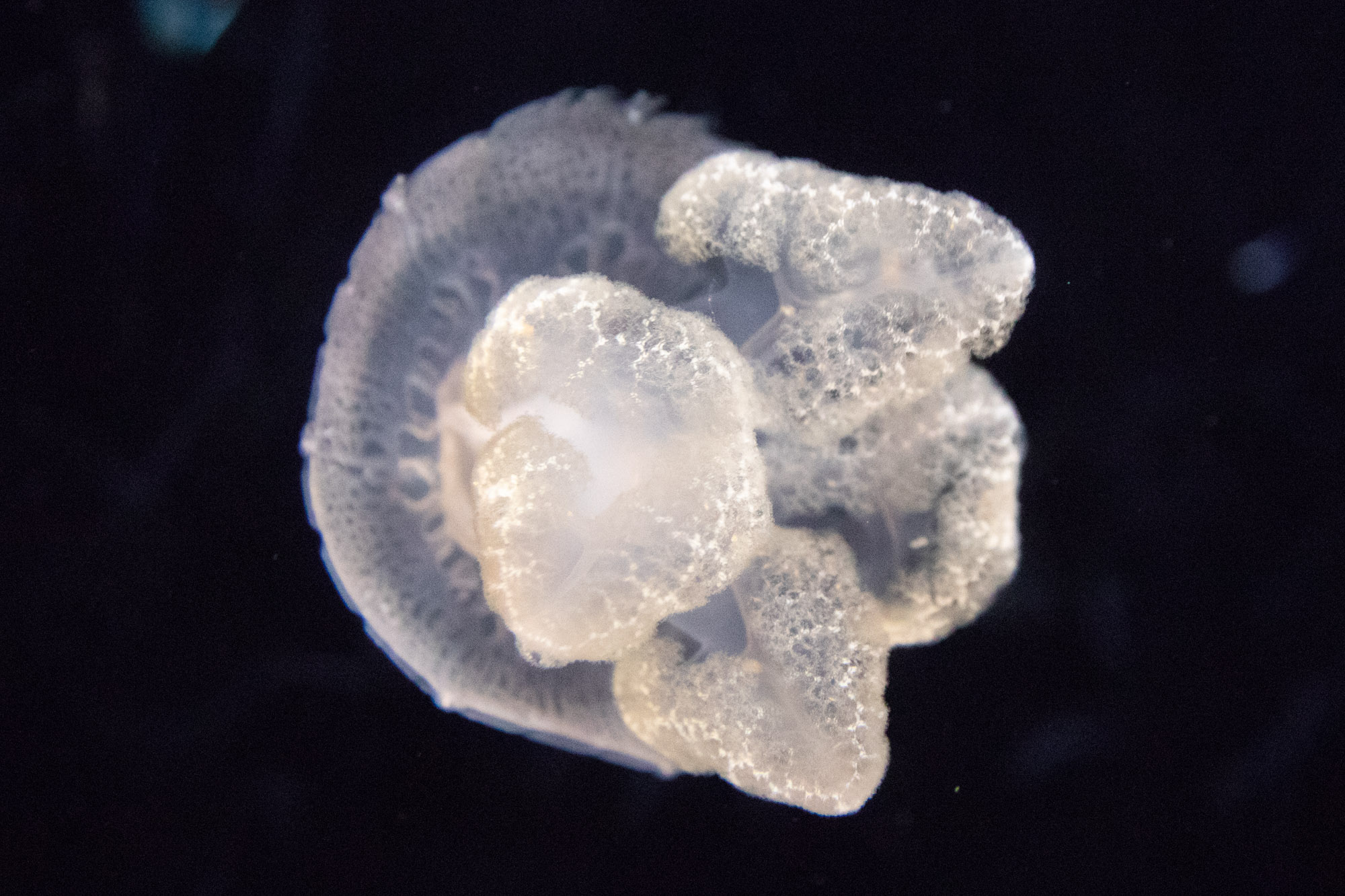
Floating Lychnoriza lucerna

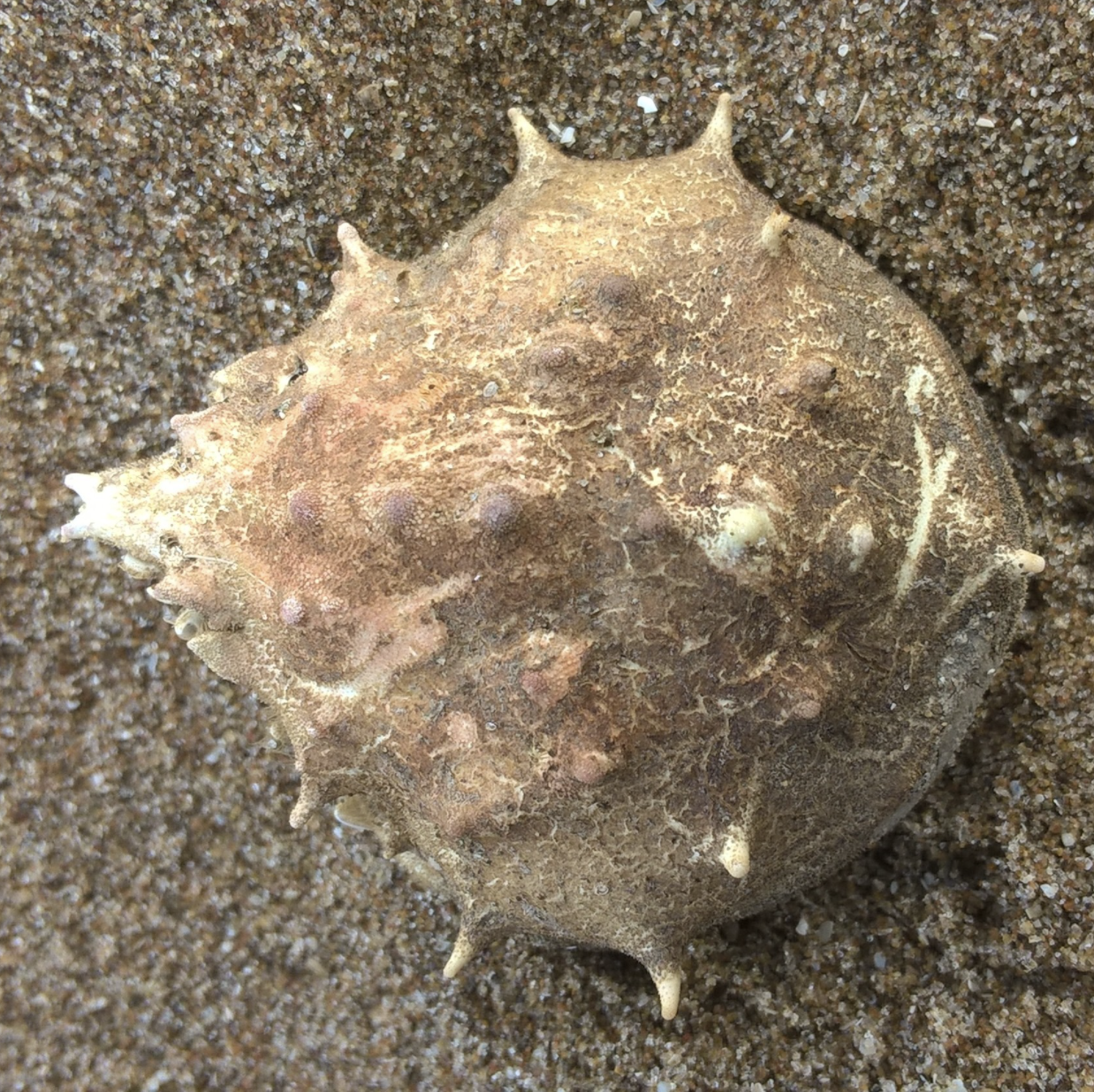
Libinia spinosa with peteropods retracted for protection

=== Prezoeal phase ===
Libinia Spinosa's total length in this phase is 0.8 mm and the larva is encased in a cuticle. Its rostrum and dorsal spine are folded. The maxillipeds have terminal, retracted setae. This stage lasts 3 to 5 minutes.

=== Zoeal phase ===
Libinia spinosa has 2 stages in the zoeal phase of its larval cycle. In the zoeal phase, Libinia spinosa contains a carapace with one rostral and one dorsal spine, seven setae are present. The abdominal somite 2 of the zoeal phase has 2 dorsolateral projections while the abdominal somite 3 lacks dorsolateral projections. The abdominal somites 3 and 4 of the zoeal phase have postero-lateral processes. There are 10 marginal setae and 1 apical setae on the scaphognathite.

=== Megalopa phase ===
The megalopal phase of Libinia spinosa contains 1 stage. The rostrum in this phase is deflected ventrally and carapaces contains spines/tuberance. There are 2 maxillule endopod setae, 0 maxilla endopod setae, 4 first maxilliped epipod setae, and 6 third maxilliped setae.

== Ecology ==
Libinia spinosa can be classified as a generalist species when it comes to diet. It consumes both mobile and nonmobile prey. It feeds on organisms such as algae, poriferans, cnidarians, mollusks, polychaetes, crustaceans, and small fish.Libinia spinosa does not have commercial value but is unintentionally caught in prawn trawls, an activity which has led to a decline in its population. Libinia spinosa carries epibionts such as sea anemones on top of its carapaces.

=== Symbiotic relationship with Lychnorhiza lucerna ===
Libinia spinosa has been shown to engage in a symbiotic relationship with the medusa Lychnorhiza lucerna, mainly during its juvenile stages. Libinia spinosa burrows itself in the subgenital pockets of Lychnorhiza lucerna.Libinia spinosa is protected from predators by the stinging cnidocytes of Lychnorhiza lucerna and also ingests food particles collected by Lychnorhiza lucerna. Additionally, this relationship allows Libinia spinosa to move through the environment while conserving its own energy. There is no clear benefit to Lychnorhiza lucerna hosting Libinia spinosa so their symbiotic relationship is likely a form of commensalism.
