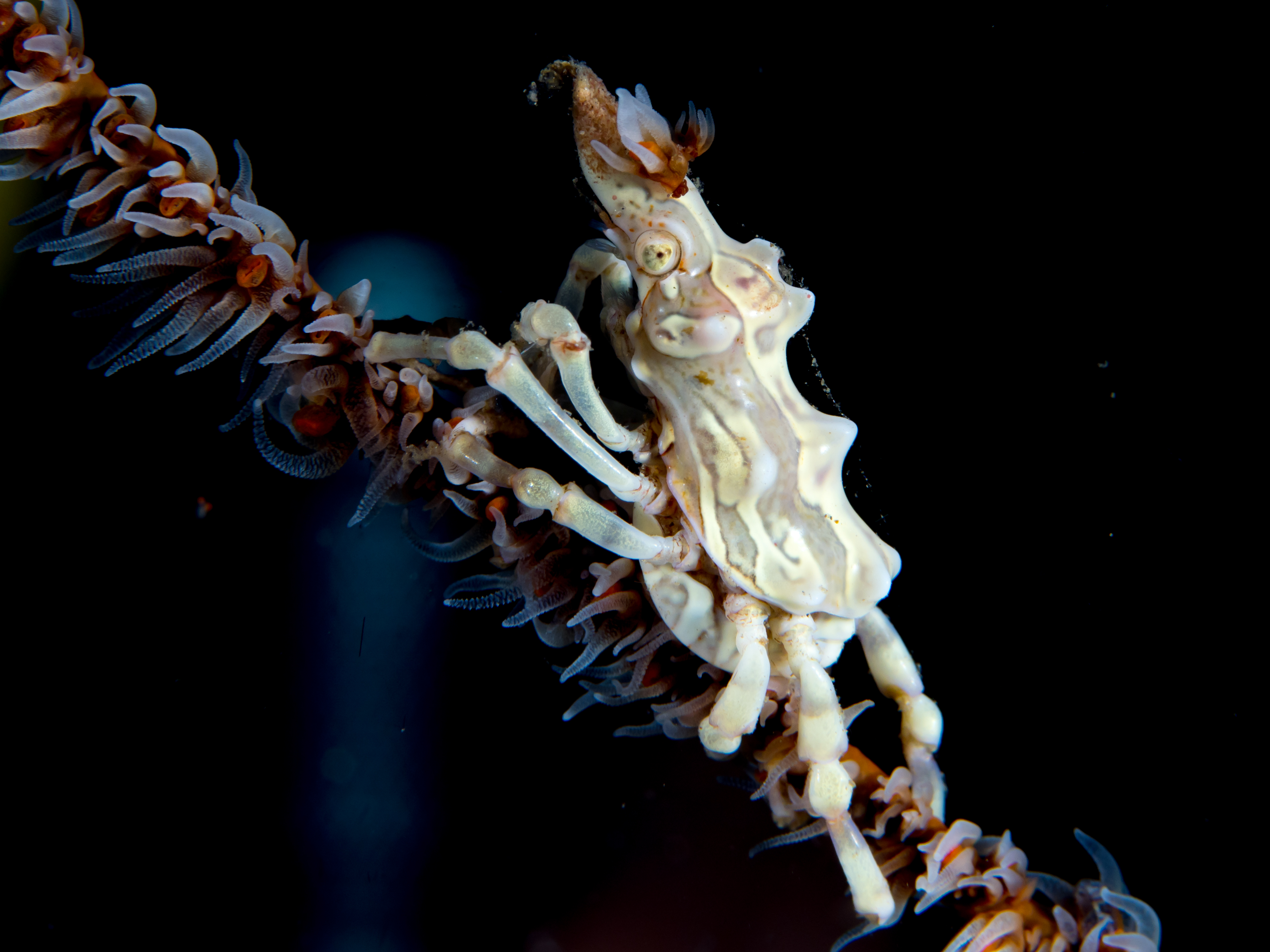
- Xenocarcinus tuberculatus
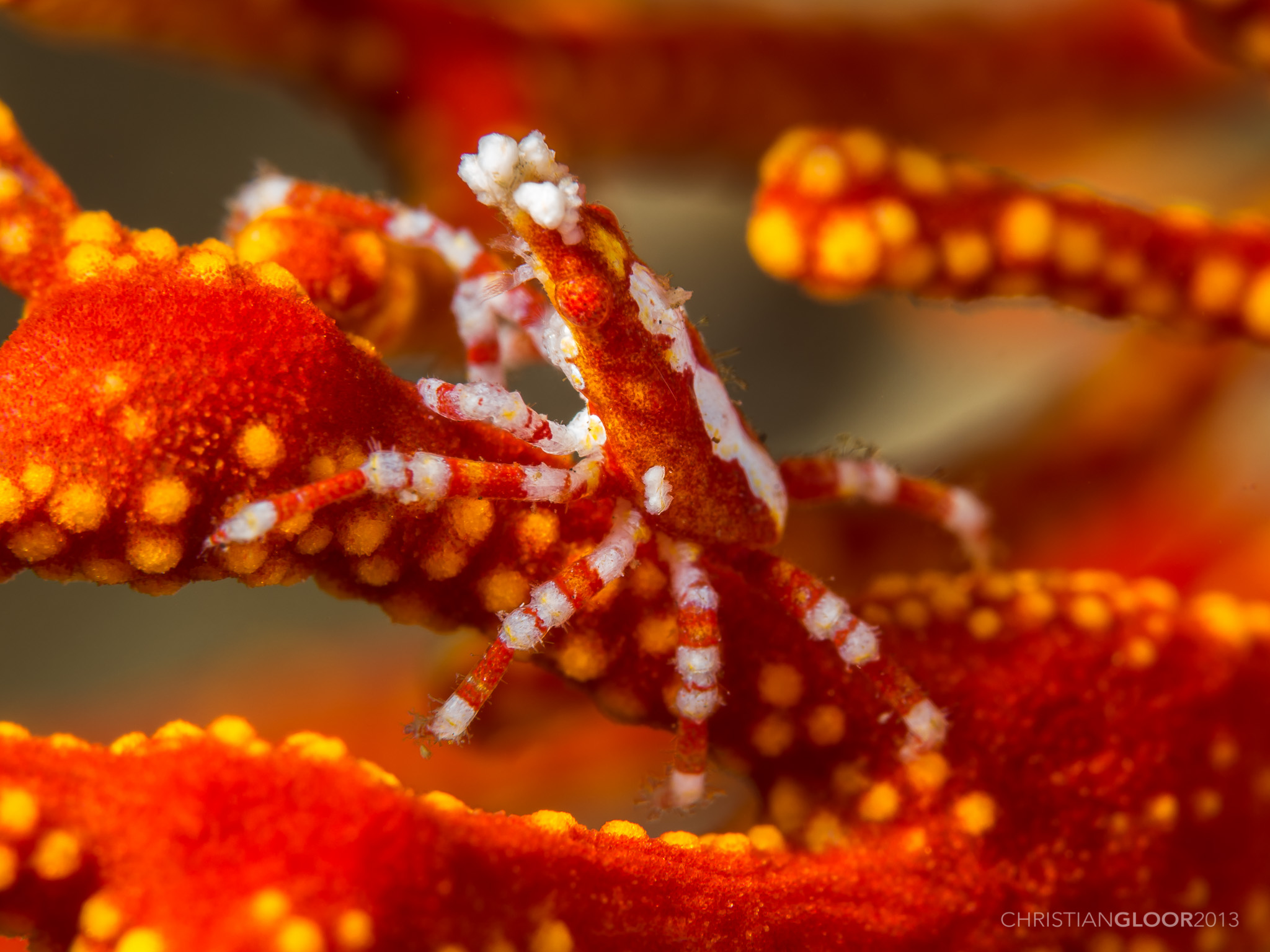
- Xenocarcinus conicus

Scientific classification
- Kingdom: Animalia
- Phylum: Arthropoda
- Clade: Pancrustacea
- Class: Malacostraca
- Order: Decapoda
- Suborder: Pleocyemata
- Infraorder: Brachyura
- Family: Epialtidae
- Subfamily: Epialtinae
- Genus: Xenocarcinus; White, 1847

Type species
- Xenocarcinus tuberculatus White, 1847

Species
- See Taxonomy

Synonyms
- Huenioides A. Milne-Edwards, 1865

= Xenocarcinus =

Genus of crabs

Xenocarcinus is a genus of spider crabs in the family Epialtidae. They inhabit soft corals at subtidal zones up to 70 meters in depth in the Indo-West Pacific region, being found in Réunion, Aldabra, the Red Sea, the Persian Gulf, Sri Lanka, the Indo-Malayan Archipelago and Japan. Xenocarcinus conicus and Xenocarcinus tuberculatus crabs were found in Mu Koh Tao, western Gulf of Thailand, associated with gorgonians and wire coral, respectively.

== Taxonomy ==
The following species are recognised in the genus Xenocarcinus:

- X. conicus (A. Milne-Edwards, 1865)
- X. depressus Miers, 1874
- X. esakii Miyake, 1939
- X. longicornis Dai & Chen, 1992
- X. monoceros Sakai, 1938
- X. truncatifrons Balss, 1938
- X. tuberculatus White, 1847
