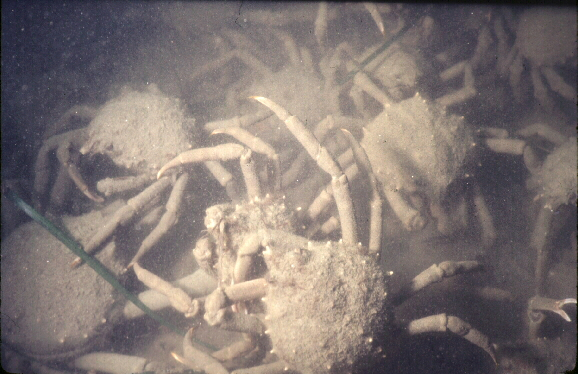
- Libinia emarginata

Scientific classification
- Domain: Eukaryota
- Kingdom: Animalia
- Phylum: Arthropoda
- Class: Malacostraca
- Order: Decapoda
- Suborder: Pleocyemata
- Infraorder: Brachyura
- Family: Epialtidae
- Subfamily: Pisinae
- Genus: Libinia; Leach, 1815

Type species
- Libinia emarginata Leach, 1815

= Libinia =

Genus of crabs

Libinia is a genus of crabs in the family Epialtidae, containing twelve extant species:

- Libinia bellicosa Oliviera, 1944
- Libinia cavirostris Chace, 1942
- Libinia dubia H. Milne-Edwards, 1834
- Libinia erinacea (A. Milne-Edwards, 1879)
- Libinia emarginata Leach, 1815
- Libinia ferreirae De Brito Capello, 1871
- Libinia mexicana Rathbun, 1892
- Libinia peruana Garth, 1983
- Libinia rhomboidea Streets, 1870
- Libinia rostrata Bell, 1835
- Libinia setosa Lockington, 1877
- Libinia spinosa H. Milne-Edwards, 1834
