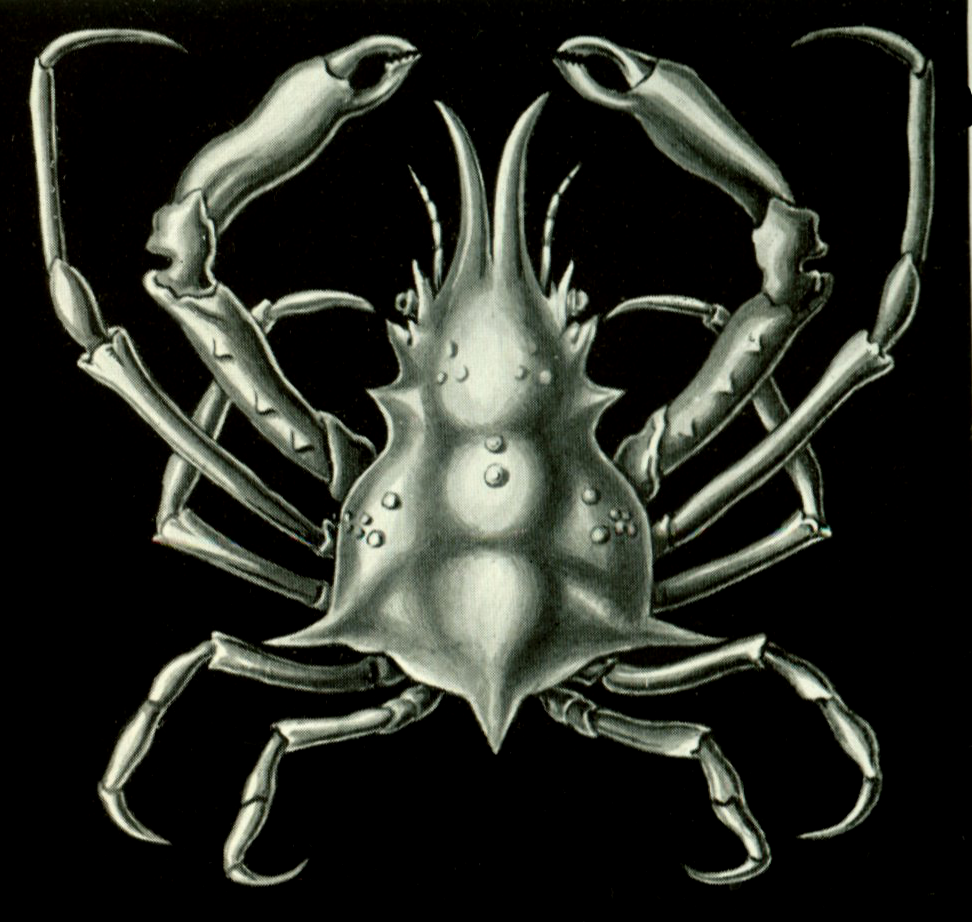

Scientific classification
- Kingdom: Animalia
- Phylum: Arthropoda
- Class: Malacostraca
- Order: Decapoda
- Suborder: Pleocyemata
- Infraorder: Brachyura
- Family: Epialtidae
- Genus: Pisa
- Species: P. armata

Binomial name
- Pisa armata (Latreille, 1803)

Synonyms
- Blastia tridens Leach in White, 1847; Cancer biaculatus Montagu, 1813; Cancer biaculeatus Montagu, 1813; Inachus musivus Otto, 1828; Maia armata Latreille, 1803; Pisa gibbsii Leach, 1816

= Pisa armata =

Species of crab

Pisa armata is a species of crab from the eastern Atlantic Ocean.

== Description ==
Pisa armata grows to a length of 40 millimetres (1.6 in). Its carapace is roughly triangular, with two prominent rostral spines, which are parallel in males, but divergent in females. The carapace is brown, but is often covered in seaweed, sponges or anemones.

== Distribution ==
Pisa armata is found in the eastern Atlantic Ocean from around the Isle of Man as far south as Angola, as well as in parts of the Mediterranean Sea. It lives at depths of 1–108 metres (3 ft 3 in – 354 ft 4 in).

== Ecology ==
Pisa armata is parasitised by a rhizocephalan barnacle. Although initially considered to be the same species that attacks other crabs such as Carcinus maenas, experiments in the 1960s demonstrated that the two were different species, Sacculina carcini on C. maenas, and Sacculina gibbsi on P. armata.
