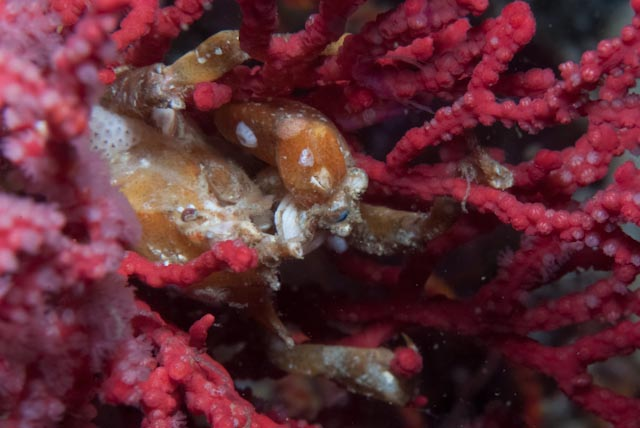
- Acanthonyx dentatus on multicoloured seafan Melithaea rubra off Cape Peninsula

Scientific classification
- Kingdom: Animalia
- Phylum: Arthropoda
- Clade: Pancrustacea
- Class: Malacostraca
- Order: Decapoda
- Suborder: Pleocyemata
- Infraorder: Brachyura
- Family: Epialtidae
- Subfamily: Epialtinae
- Genus: Acanthonyx; Latreille, 1828

Species
- See text

= Acanthonyx =

Genus of crabs

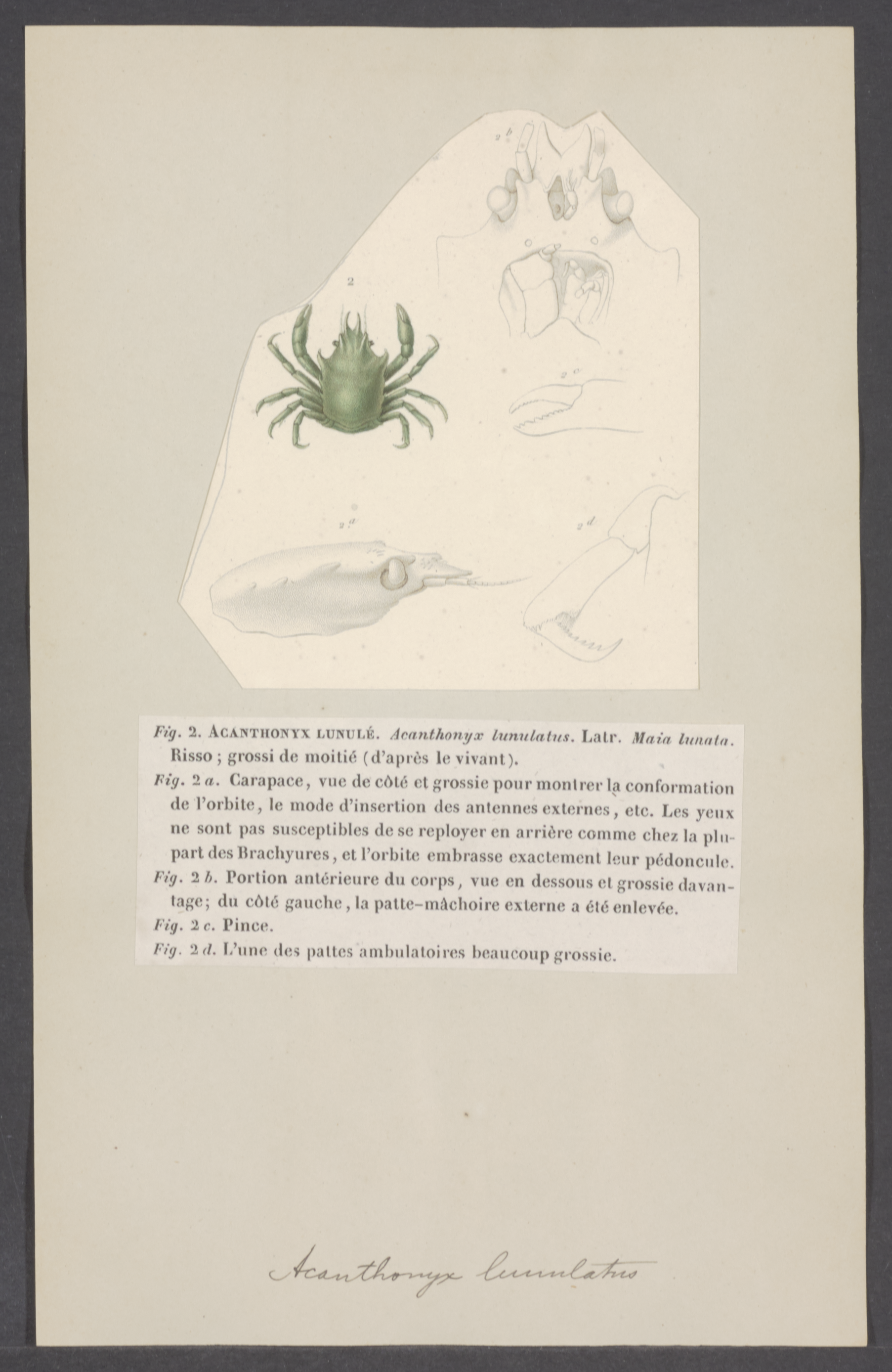

Acanthonyx is a genus of crabs, in the family Epialtidae, which was first described in 1828 by. The type species is Acanthonyx lunulatus.

Species of this genus are found in the East and West Atlantic, Mediterranean Sea, Indian Ocean, and the west and east Pacific Ocean.

== Species ==
Species so far known include:

- Acanthonyx consobrinus A. Milne-Edwards, 1862
- Acanthonyx dentatus H. Milne-Edwards, 1834
- Acanthonyx depressifrons Manning & Holthuis, 1981
- Acanthonyx dissimulatus Coelho, 1993
- Acanthonyx elongatus Miers, 1877
- Acanthonyx euryseroche Griffin & Tranter, 1986
- Acanthonyx formosa Wu, Yu & Ng, 1999
- Acanthonyx inglei Tirmizi & Kazmi, 1988
- Acanthonyx limbatus A. Milne-Edwards, 1862
- Acanthonyx lunulatus (Risso, 1816)
- Acanthonyx minor Manning & Holthuis, 1981
- ?Acanthonyx nodulosa (Dana, 1852)
- Acanthonyx petiverii H. Milne-Edwards, 1834
- Acanthonyx quadridentatus Krauss, 1843
- Acanthonyx sanctaehelenae Chace, 1966
- Acanthonyx scutellatus MacLeay, 1838
- Acanthonyx scutiformis (Dana, 1851)
- Acanthonyx undulatus Barnard, 1947
