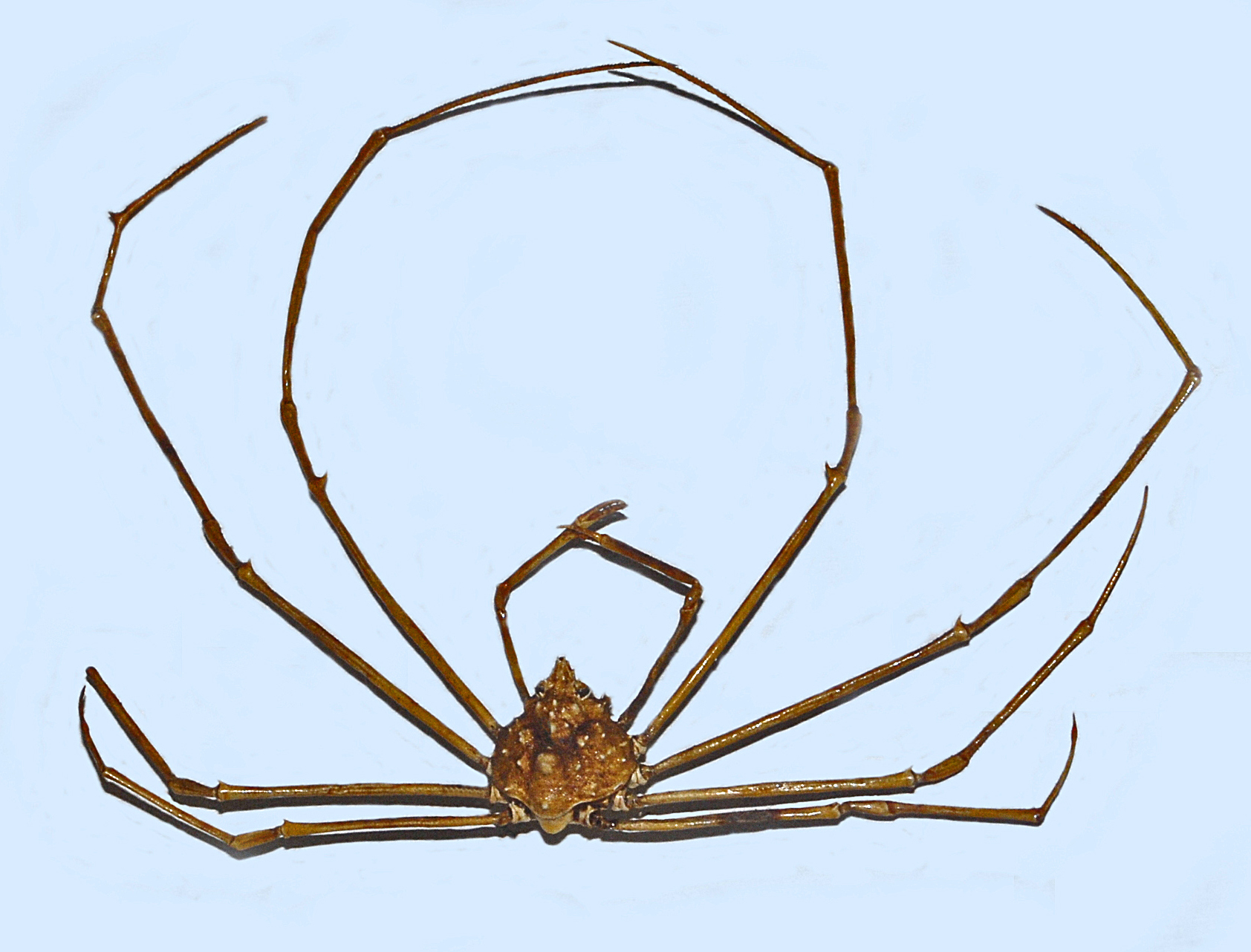
- Phalangipus longipes

Scientific classification
- Domain: Eukaryota
- Kingdom: Animalia
- Phylum: Arthropoda
- Class: Malacostraca
- Order: Decapoda
- Suborder: Pleocyemata
- Infraorder: Brachyura
- Family: Epialtidae
- Subfamily: Pisinae
- Genus: Phalangipus; Latreille, 1828

= Phalangipus =

Genus of crabs

Phalangipus is a genus of crabs in the family Epialtidae.

== Species ==
- Phalangipus australiensis Rathbun, 1918
- Phalangipus filiformis Rathbun, 1916
- Phalangipus hystrix (Miers, 1886)
- Phalangipus indicus (Leach, 1815)
- Phalangipus longipes (Linnaeus, 1758)
- Phalangipus malakkensis Griffin, 1973
- Phalangipus persicus Griffin, 1973
- Phalangipus retusus Rathbun, 1916
- Phalangipus trachysternus Griffin, 1973
