= Goniothorax =

Scientific classification
- Domain: Eukaryota
- Kingdom: Animalia
- Phylum: Arthropoda
- Class: Malacostraca
- Order: Decapoda
- Suborder: Pleocyemata
- Infraorder: Brachyura
- Family: Epialtidae
- Genus: Goniothorax; A. Milne-Edwards, 1879
- Species: G. ruber

Binomial name
- Goniothorax ruber A. Milne-Edwards, 1879

Genus of crabs

Goniothorax ruber is a species of crab in the family Epialtidae and the only species in the genus Goniothorax.
