= Actinotocarcinus =

Actinotocarcinus Temporal range: Miocene

Scientific classification
- Kingdom: Animalia
- Phylum: Arthropoda
- Clade: Pancrustacea
- Class: Malacostraca
- Order: Decapoda
- Suborder: Pleocyemata
- Infraorder: Brachyura
- Family: Epialtidae
- Subfamily: †Actinotocarcininae
- Genus: †Actinotocarcinus; Jenkins, 1974

Type species
- Actinotocarcinus chidgeyi Jenkins, 1974

Species
- A. chidgeyi Jenkins, 1974; A. maclauchlani Feldmann, 1993

Extinct genus of crabs

Actinotocarcinus is an extinct genus of Miocene crab, and is the only genus in the subfamily Actinotocarcininae of the family Epialtidae, though was originally classified in the family Majidae. Actinotocarcinus comprises two species, A. chidgeyi, and A. maclauchlani, both from Miocene-aged marine strata of New Zealand.
