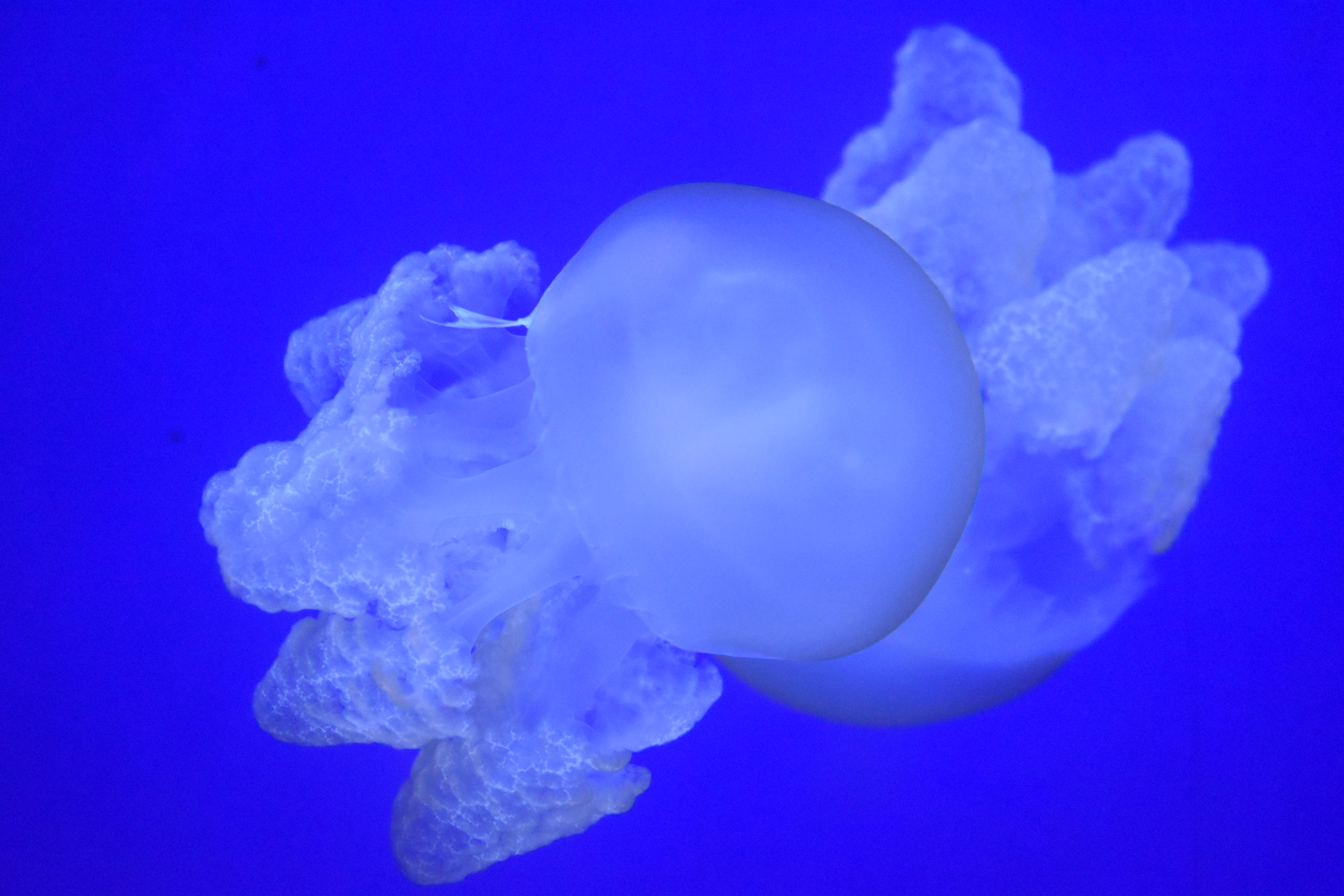

Scientific classification
- Domain: Eukaryota
- Kingdom: Animalia
- Phylum: Cnidaria
- Class: Scyphozoa
- Order: Rhizostomeae
- Family: Lychnorhizidae
- Genus: Lychnorhiza
- Species: L. lucerna

Binomial name
- Lychnorhiza lucerna Haeckel, 1880

= Lychnorhiza lucerna =

Species of jellyfish

Lychnorhiza lucerna or Marbled Jelly is a species of jellyfish in the order Rhizostomeae. It is found off the Atlantic coasts of South America.

== Description ==
When small, Lychnorhiza lucerna has a hemispherical bell, but this becomes flattened into a saucer shape as the jellyfish grows. Very large specimens have been known to reach 45 centimetres (18 in) in diameter and are dish-shaped. The upper surface is flexible and thin and is covered in low conical projections. Round the periphery are many small, triangular lappets. Hanging under the bell there are four pairs of oral tentacles, about two thirds as long as the diameter of the bell. The upper halves of these are somewhat flattened and the lower halves divide into three vanes which have multiple, inrolled edges. Among these are suctorial mouthlets leading to the interior of the bell and various thick dangling filaments. There is no central mouth. The stomach occupies most of the interior of the bell and there are a ring of small cream or white gonads round its edge. The colouration of this jellyfish varies, but in general, the bell is translucent and colourless or a pale shade of buff, sometimes with irregular streaks of light brown. The dangling lappets round the edge of the bell are darker brown and the lower parts of the oral tentacles may be brown as well, the upper parts being colourless.

== Distribution ==
Lychnorhiza lucerna is found in tropical waters in the western Atlantic Ocean. Its range extends from French Guiana to Buenos Aires Province in Argentina. It occurs in shallow coastal habitats and estuaries and is the most abundant jellyfish in its order (Rhizostomeae) in these waters. It often becomes stranded on beaches.

== Life history ==
Lychnorhiza lucerna has a complex life cycle with an alternation of sexual and asexual stages. An adult jellyfish is known as a medusa and is gonochoristic, which means that it is either male or female. The fertilized eggs hatch into planula larvae. These soon settle and undergo metamorphosis into sessile polyps, known as a scyphistomae, with four tentacles. These grow larger, and after a series of moults have twenty-two tentacles. They develop cysts from which new polyps known as ephyrae grow. These develop transverse constrictions and separate from the original polyp by strobilation. The scyphistomae can strobilate several times and in a study it was estimated that one founder polyp could produce up to sixty ephyrae in a period of four months. Ephyrae develop into juvenile medusae after a further fifteen days or so.

== Ecology ==
Lychnorhiza lucerna has associations with the parasitic flatworm Dibothriorhynchus dinoi, shrimps Periclimenes spp, the Atlantic bumper fish, Chloroscombrus chrysurus and the bluntnose jack, Hemicaranx amblyrhynchus. Young spider crabs, Libinia ferreirae and Libinia spinosa, use the inside of the bell as a nursery where they are safe from predation.
