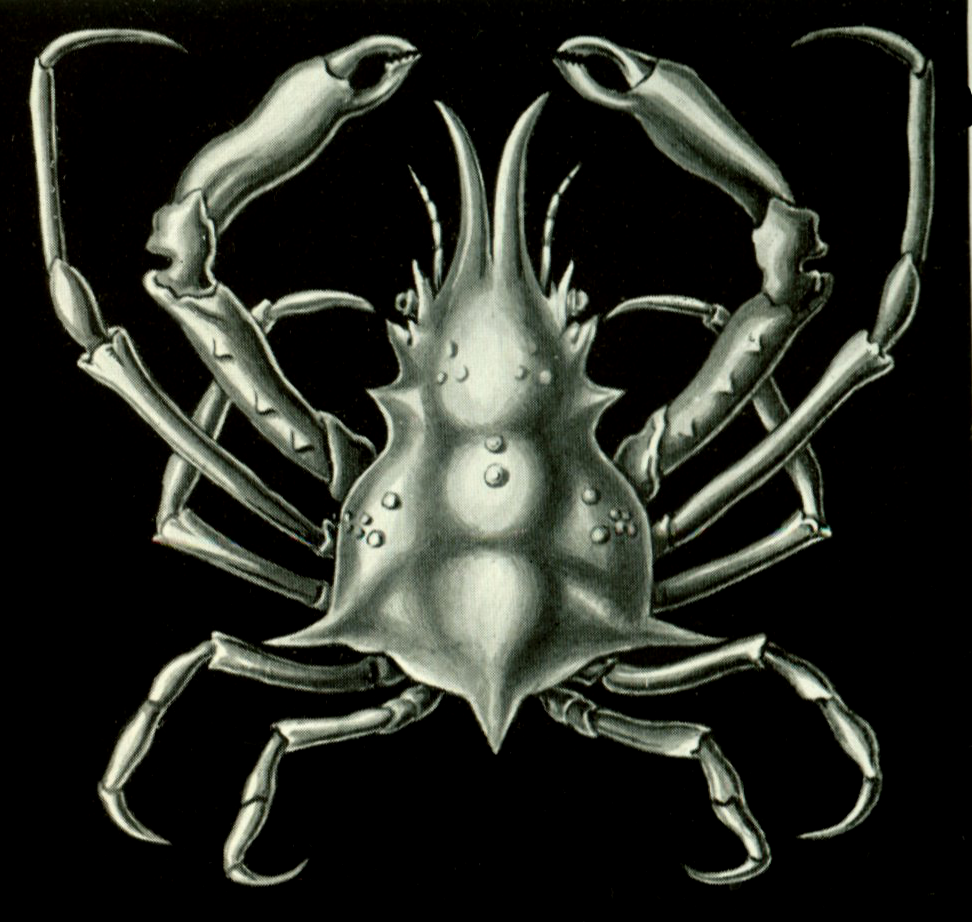
- Pisa armata

Scientific classification
- Domain: Eukaryota
- Kingdom: Animalia
- Phylum: Arthropoda
- Class: Malacostraca
- Order: Decapoda
- Suborder: Pleocyemata
- Infraorder: Brachyura
- Family: Epialtidae
- Genus: Pisa; Leach, 1814

= Pisa (crab) =

Genus of crabs

Pisa is a genus of crabs, containing the following species:

- Pisa armata (Latreille, 1803)
- Pisa calva Forest & Guinot, 1966
- Pisa carinimana Miers, 1879
- Pisa hirticornis (Herbst, 1804)
- Pisa lanata (Lamarck, 1801)
- Pisa muscosa (Linnaeus, 1758)
- Pisa nodipes (Leach, 1815)
- Pisa sanctaehelenae Chace, 1966
- Pisa tetraodon (Pennant, 1777)
