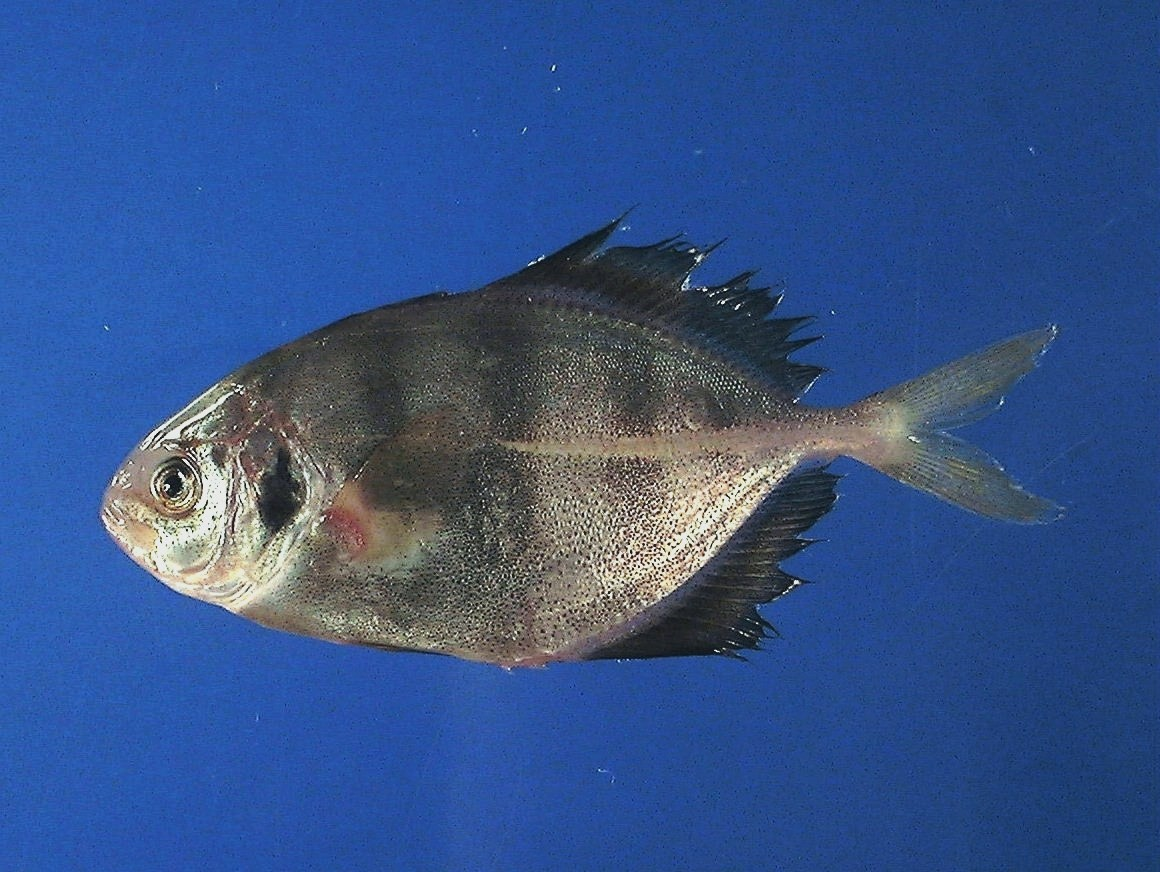

Conservation status
- Least Concern (IUCN 3.1)

Scientific classification
- Kingdom: Animalia
- Phylum: Chordata
- Class: Actinopterygii
- Order: Carangiformes
- Suborder: Carangoidei
- Family: Carangidae
- Genus: Hemicaranx
- Species: H. amblyrhynchus

Binomial name
- Hemicaranx amblyrhynchus (G. Cuvier, 1833)

Synonyms
- Caranx amblyrhynchus Cuvier, 1833; Hemicaranx rhomboides Meek & Hildebrand, 1925

= Hemicaranx amblyrhynchus =

Species of ray-finned fish

Hemicaranx amblyrhynchus (bluntnose jack) is a tropical marine fish in the jack family (Carangidae). It is found in shallow parts of the western Atlantic Ocean.

== Description ==
The bluntnose jack is a deep bodied fish with a large, deeply forked tail fin. The dorsal fin is divided in two parts and has 8 spines and 27 soft rays. The long anal fin tapers towards the tail and has 3 spines and 23 soft rays. Adults normally grow to about 25 cm (10 in) in length.

== Distribution ==
The bluntnose jack is found in the neritic zone in the western Atlantic Ocean at depths down to about 50 metres (160 ft). Its range extends from North Carolina, through the Gulf of Mexico an southwards to Florianópolis in Brazil. It is largely absent from the Lesser Antilles.

== Ecology ==
The bluntnose jack is sometimes associated with the jellyfish, Lychnorhiza lucerna.
