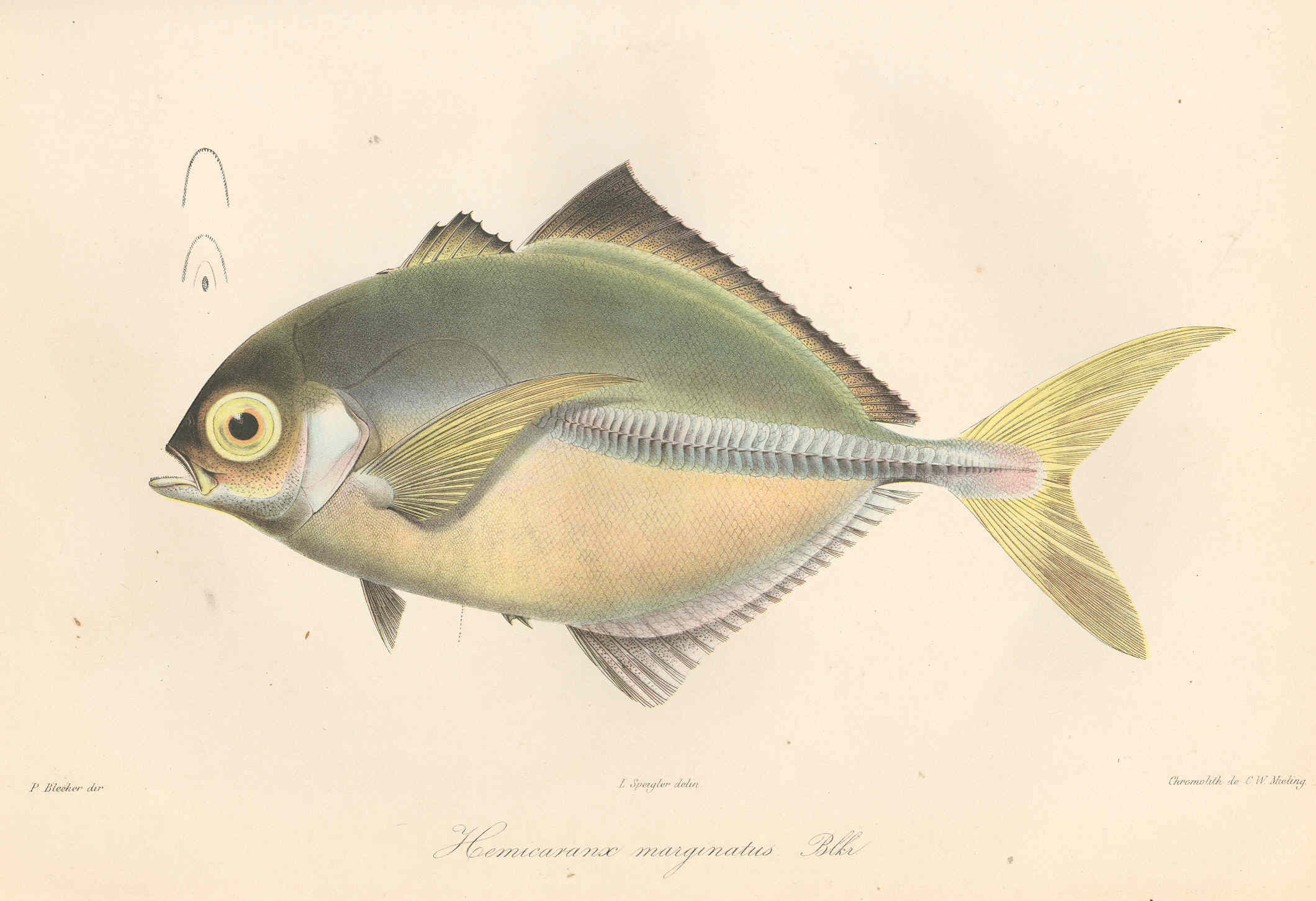

Conservation status
- Least Concern (IUCN 3.1)

Scientific classification
- Kingdom: Animalia
- Phylum: Chordata
- Class: Actinopterygii
- Order: Carangiformes
- Suborder: Carangoidei
- Family: Carangidae
- Genus: Hemicaranx
- Species: H. bicolor

Binomial name
- Hemicaranx bicolor (Günther, 1860)

Synonyms
- Caranx bicolor Günther, 1860; Alepes bicolor (Günther, 1860); Hemicaranx marginatus Bleeker, 1862; Alepes marginatus (Bleeker, 1862); Caranx marginatus (Schlegel, 1862)

= Hemicaranx bicolor =

Species of ray-finned fish

Hemicaranx bicolor is a species of jack fishes in the family Carangidae. It is found in the eastern Atlantic Ocean around Africa. Adults can grow up to 70 centimetres (28 in) but usually grow up to 25 centimetres (9.8 in).

== Distribution and habitat ==
This species of jack is found in the eastern Atlantic Ocean around western Africa. It is known to occur in rivers and estuaries.

== Description ==
Adults can grow up to 70 centimetres (28 in) but usually grow up to 25 centimetres (9.8 in).
