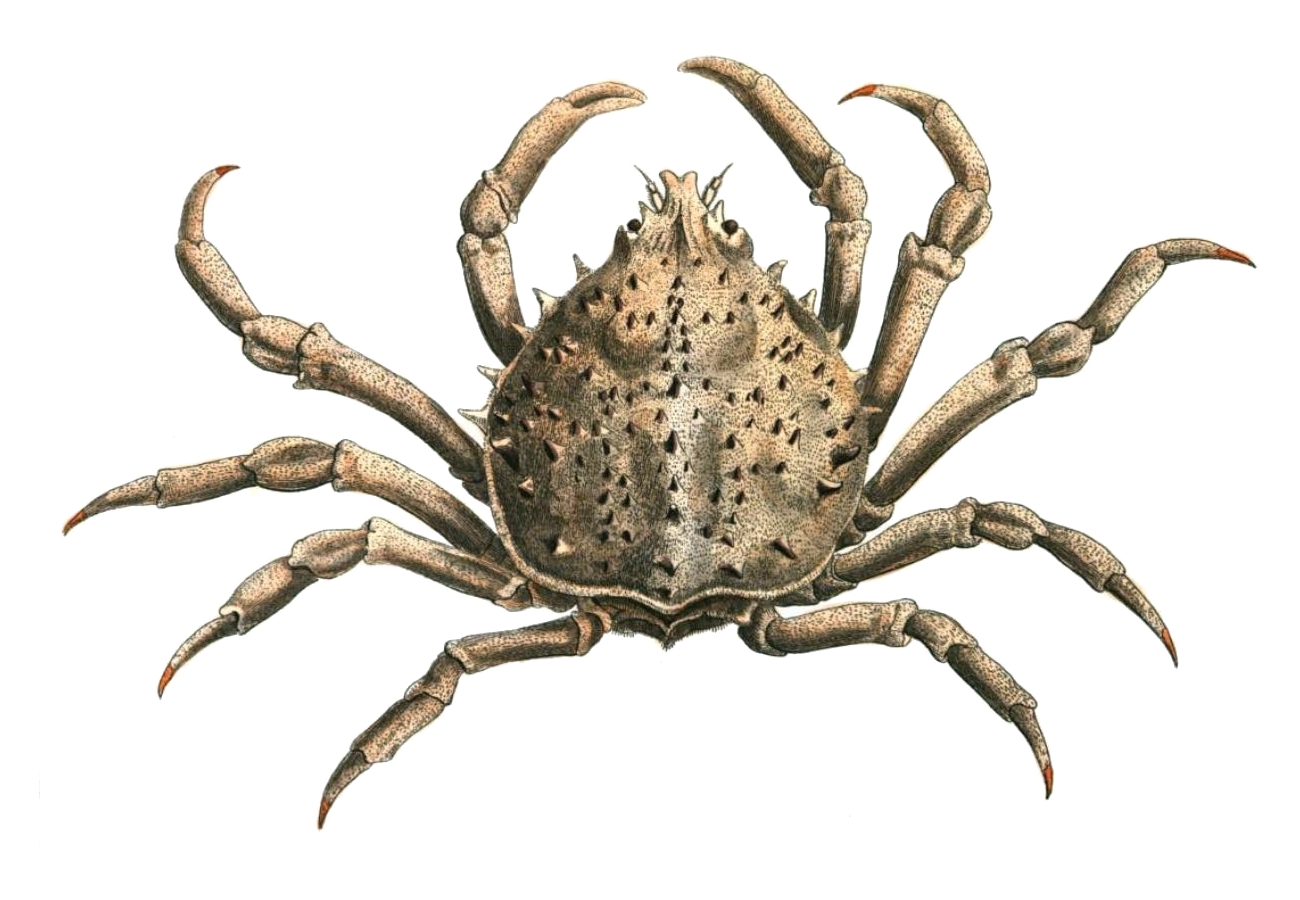

Scientific classification
- Kingdom: Animalia
- Phylum: Arthropoda
- Class: Malacostraca
- Order: Decapoda
- Suborder: Pleocyemata
- Infraorder: Brachyura
- Family: Epialtidae
- Genus: Libinia
- Species: L. emarginata

Binomial name
- Libinia emarginata Leach, 1815

Synonyms
- Libinia canaliculata Say, 1817

= Libinia emarginata =

Species of crustacean

Libinia emarginata, the portly spider crab, common spider crab or nine-spined spider crab, is a species of stenohaline crab that lives on the Atlantic coast of North America.

== Distribution ==
Libinia emarginata occurs from Nova Scotia to the Florida Keys and through the Gulf of Mexico. It lives at depths of up to 160 ft (49 m), with exceptional records of up to 400 ft (120 m).

== Description ==
Libinia emarginata is roughly triangular in outline and very heavily calcified, with a carapace about 4 in (100 mm) long and a leg span of 12 inches (300 mm). The whole crab is khaki, and the carapace is covered in spines and tubercles, and, as with other decorator crabs, often clothes itself in debris and small invertebrates.

=== Reproduction ===
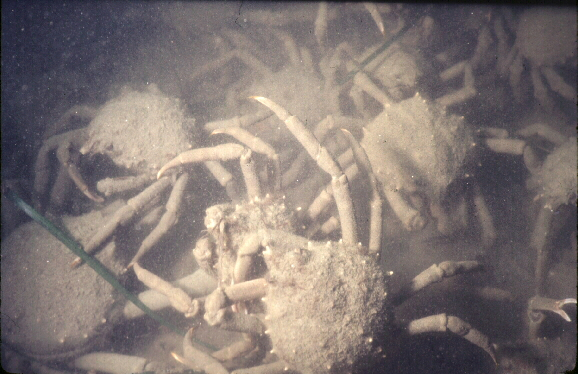
A mating aggregation of L. emarginata

Mating takes place, and eggs are produced from June to September. The eggs are initially a bright orange-red, but turn brown during development, which takes around 25 days. The eggs then hatch as zoea larvae, and the female can produce another brood of eggs within 12 hours, unlike many other crab species whose females only mate immediately after molting.

== Similar species ==
Libinia emarginata is very similar to Libinia dubia with which it is largely sympatric. They can be told apart by examining the row of spines along the center of the carapace: in L. emarginata there are nine, while in L. dubia there are only six. Also, the rostrum of L. dubia is more deeply forked than that of L. emarginata.

== Ecology and behavior ==
Libinia emarginata lives on various substrates, at depths of up to 150 ft (46 m). Adults are sluggish and not aggressive, and younger crabs are frequently covered with sponges and hydroids.

Despite its small size, in comparison to other predatory crabs, L. emarginata feeds on large starfish such as Asterias forbesi.

Unusually for crabs, L. emarginata preferentially walks forwards, rather than sideways, although they are also capable of sidelong movement. Its skeletal, muscular and neural anatomy more closely resembles that of forward-walking species, rather than that of more closely related sideways-walking species.

L. emarginata will mate in large aggregations. These aggregations may function as a protective mechanism during reproduction. Males of L. emarginata show an unusual "obstetrical behavior", in which gravid females who are about to release their larvae are held behind the male and aggressively protected.
