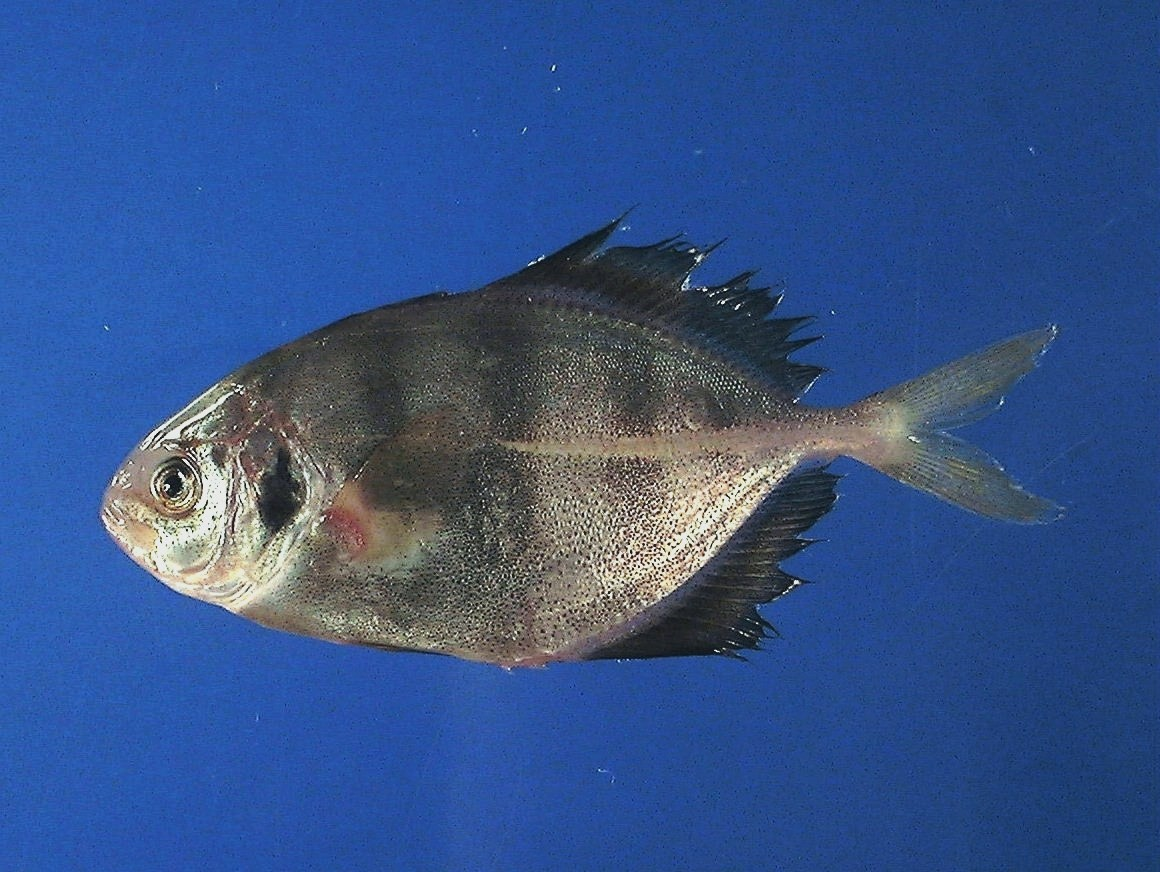
- Bluntnose jack (H. amblyrhynchus)

Scientific classification
- Kingdom: Animalia
- Phylum: Chordata
- Class: Actinopterygii
- Order: Carangiformes
- Suborder: Carangoidei
- Family: Carangidae
- Subfamily: Caranginae
- Genus: Hemicaranx; Bleeker, 1862

Type species
- Hemicaranx marginatus Bleeker, 1862

= Hemicaranx =

Genus of ray-finned fishes

Hemicaranx is a genus of ray-finned fish from the family Carangidae, the jacks, pompanos, scads and trevallies, found in the Atlantic and Pacific oceans.

== Species ==
There are currently four recognized species in this genus:

Image	Scientific name	Common name	Distribution
	Hemicaranx amblyrhynchus (G. Cuvier, 1833)	Bluntnose jack	western Atlantic Ocean
	Hemicaranx bicolor (Günther, 1860 )	Bicolor jack	eastern Atlantic Ocean around Africa.
	Hemicaranx leucurus (Günther, 1864 )	Yellowfin jack	southern tip of Baja California, Mexico and southern Gulf of California to Ecuador.
	Hemicaranx zelotes C. H. Gilbert, 1898	Blackfin jack	Eastern Central Pacific: Baja California, Mexico to Peru
