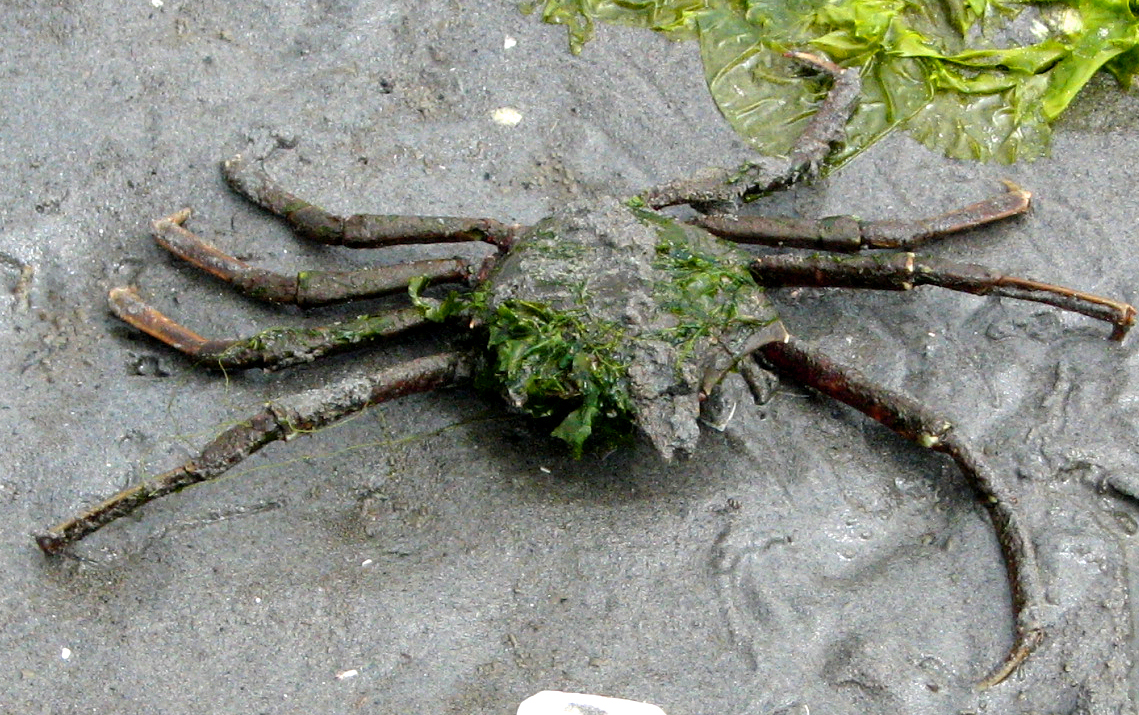

Scientific classification
- Kingdom: Animalia
- Phylum: Arthropoda
- Clade: Pancrustacea
- Class: Malacostraca
- Order: Decapoda
- Suborder: Pleocyemata
- Infraorder: Brachyura
- Family: Epialtidae
- Genus: Pugettia
- Species: P. producta

Binomial name
- Pugettia producta (J. W. Randall, 1840)

Synonyms
- Epialtus productus Randall, 1840

= Pugettia producta =

Northern kelp crab

Species of crab

Pugettia producta, known as the northern kelp crab or shield-backed kelp crab, is a species of crab in the family Epialtidae.

== Description ==
Its upper carapace is typically dark brown, olive, or olive-brown. The underside surface tends to be more vibrant having colors such as red, yellow, or orange. Younger crabs may be lighter olive-brown or reddish-brown. The carapace is a badge-like shape similar to a police officer's badge or shield; hence the secondary name shield-backed crab. Its carapace is curved and smooth, with a slick texture. The front of the crab has a protrusion called a rostrum, extending the carapace and is used in feeding. They have large chelipeds used for defense and feeding. The northern kelp crab is part of the spider crab family and exhibits the long many jointed hairless legs associated with the family. Their long legs and shield-like carapace are key identifying factors.

== Distribution ==
It is found along the Pacific Coast of North America from southern Alaska to northern Mexico.

== Sexual dimorphism ==
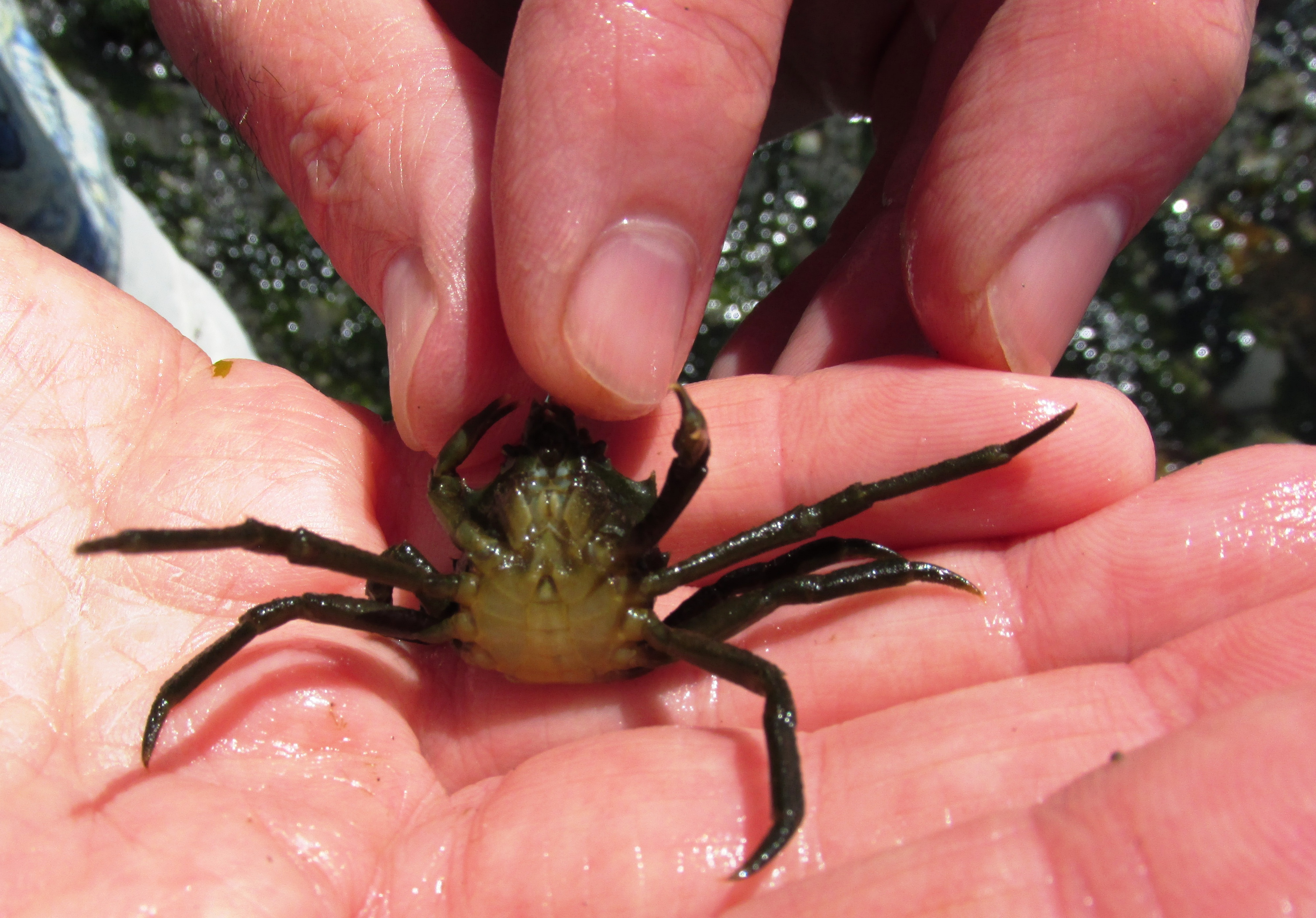
Male northern kelp crab

Male crabs tend to be slightly larger than female crabs at about 93 mm (3.7 in) across the carapace. Females tend to be 7.8 cm (3.1 in). Female crabs exhibit a broader back and smaller chelipeds than males.

== Behavior ==
Northern kelp crabs are known for their association with kelp and their similar coloration. Their long many-jointed legs have evolved to help them climb bull kelp and also provide help climbing man-made pilings. These crabs are also common in lower intertidal zones in beds of algae or eelgrass. They may also be found under rocks or shelters at extreme low tides within the intertidal zones.

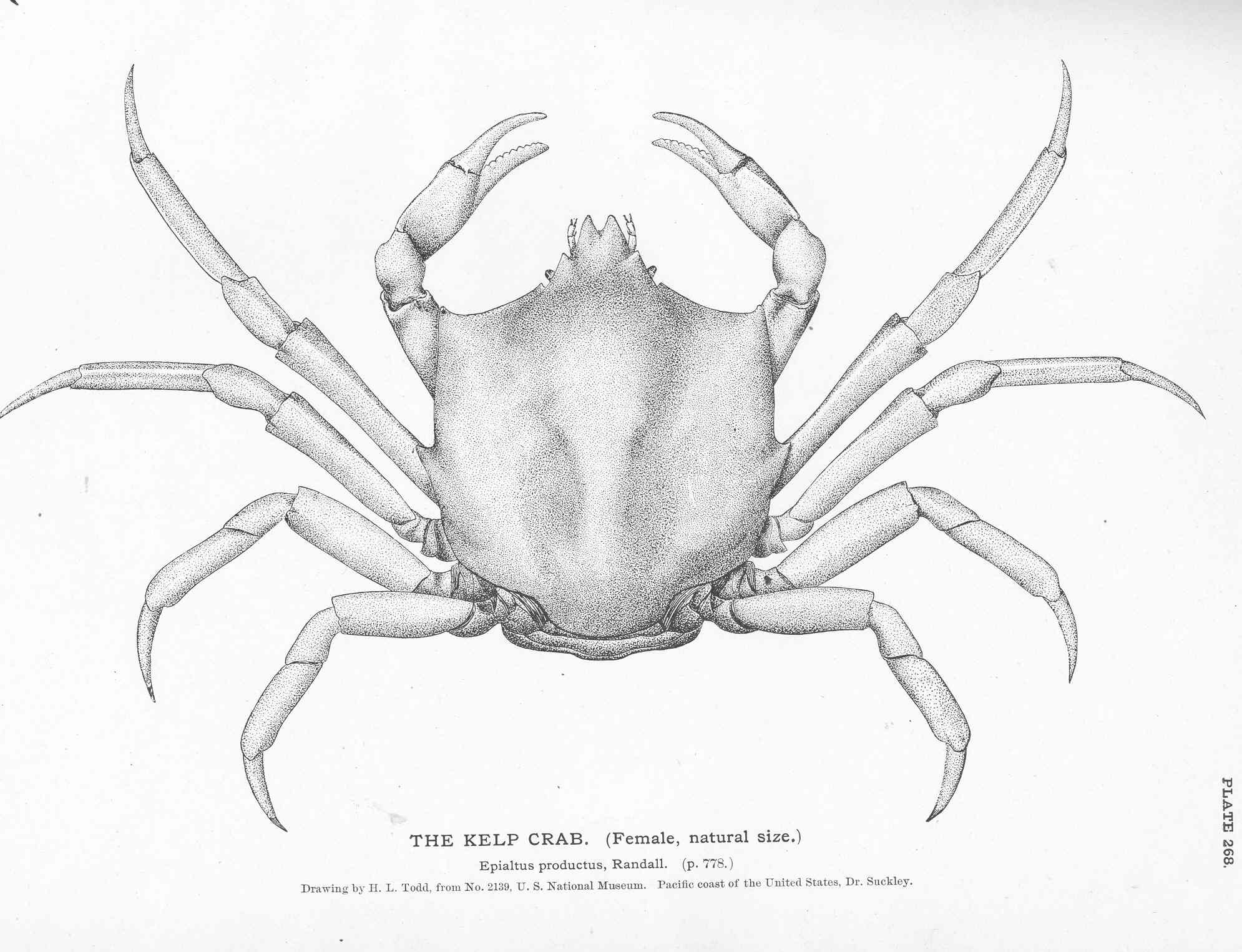
Female northern kelp crab with broadened carapace.

Northern kelp crabs are herbivores with seasonal preferences. In the summer months when algae is prevalent, they eat nearly exclusively algae. They eat kelp, rockweed, sargassum, and some types of red algae. Whereas in the winter, they are more carnivorous, eating small mussels, barnacles, bryozoans, and hydroids. This seasonal adaptation is an evolutionary advantage when preferred food is scarce.

The northern kelp crab can be differentiated from similar species like the decorator crabs by its two rows of hooked setae right behind its rostrum. The northern kelp crab sometimes attaches bits of kelp and seaweed to these hooked setae to store as food for later. The northern kelp crab does not decorate its carapace as other majid crabs do.

== Predation ==
Northern kelp crabs are predated by a few different animals in different stages of life. Adults are frequently eaten by cabezon, gulls, sea otters, and staghorn sculpins. Sea otters are significant predators of the northern kelp crab within kelp forests. As pelagic larvae (zoeae) they are eaten by Velella velella or the by-the-wind sailor.

The northern kelp crab can be parasitized by Heterosaccus californicus (rhizocephalan sacculinid barnacle) which exhibits a brown mass extending from the crab's underbelly. Once the crab has been parasitized, it will only molt one more time. During this molt, the barnacle then pushes its reproductive sac through the crab's molt-softened carapace. This damages or destroys the crab's male reproductive organs and which leads males to exhibit some female characteristics. These parasite-damaged males may become hermaphroditic and produce both eggs and sperm. Parasite-damaged females may have a faster development of mature characteristics.

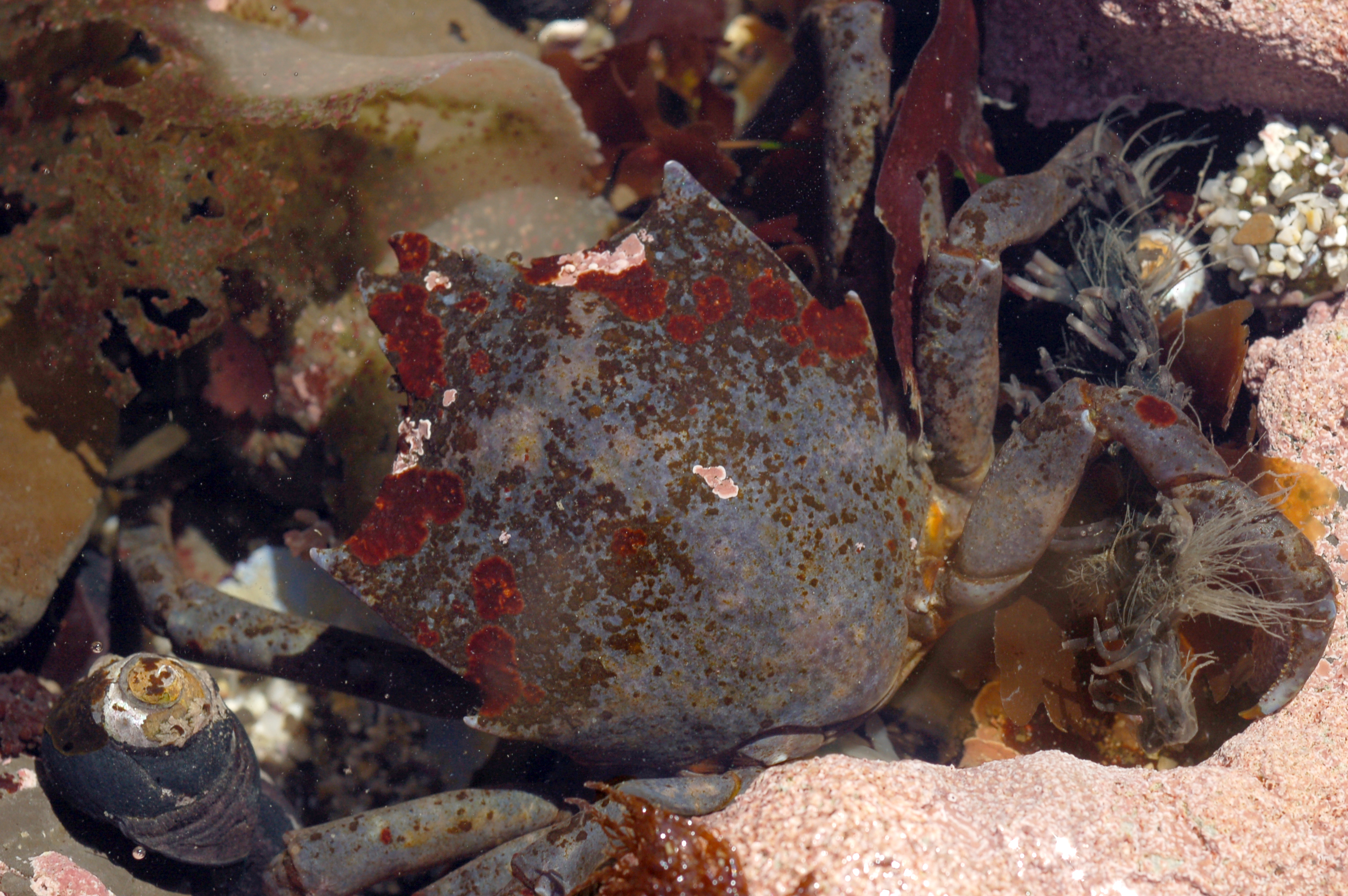
Characteristic shield-like carapace shown.

== Reproduction and life cycle ==
Adult crabs migrate to waters as deep as 75 m to mate. They join together, feed, then mate. Females may carry eggs during most parts of the year but are rarely seen in south Puget Sound in May, September, and October. These clutches may be from 34,000 to 84,000 eggs. Eggs change color as they age. They begin bright orange, change to red as they mature, and hatch when they are a grayish purple color. This maturating and development may take anywhere from a month to nearly a year.

This crab has a terminal molt which may end up covered with barnacles, limpets, or bits of algae.

== Human consumption ==
Northern kelp crabs are not attractive for human consumption. They are difficult to purposely catch and bear very little meat. Their chelipeds are large and adept. They have an aggressively strong pinch.
