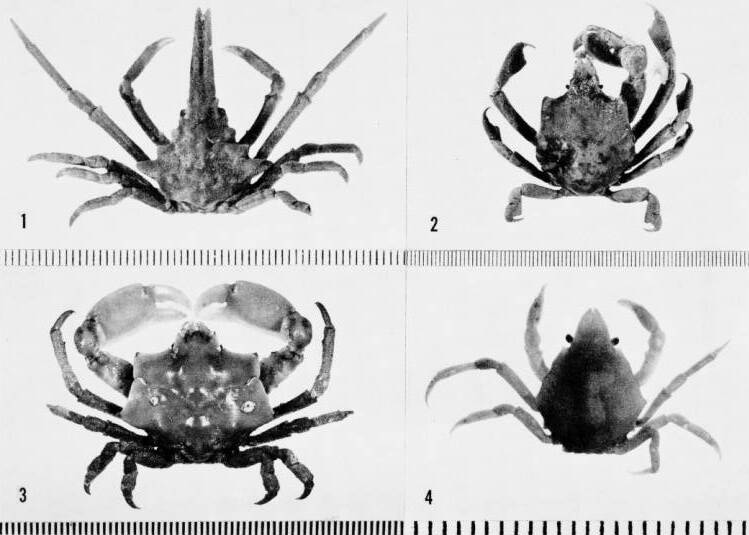
- Dorsal view of 1) Rhinocarcinus agassizi, male (Pisinae), 2) Acanthonyx petiveri, male, 3) Pugettia foliata, male, 4) Leucippa pentagona, young male (Epialtinae)

Scientific classification
- Kingdom: Animalia
- Phylum: Arthropoda
- Class: Malacostraca
- Order: Decapoda
- Suborder: Pleocyemata
- Infraorder: Brachyura
- Superfamily: Majoidea
- Family: Epialtidae; MacLeay, 1838

Subfamilies
- See text

= Epialtidae =

Family of crabs

Epialtidae is a family of crabs, containing the subfamilies:

- Epialtinae MacLeay, 1838
- Pisinae Dana, 1851
- Pliosomatinae Števčić, 1994
- Tychinae Dana, 1851
- †Actinotocarcininae
