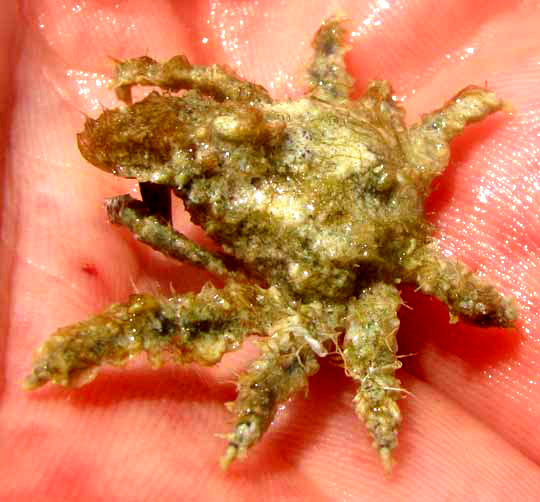
- Speck-claw Decorator Crab, top view

Scientific classification
- Kingdom: Animalia
- Phylum: Arthropoda
- Clade: Pancrustacea
- Class: Malacostraca
- Order: Decapoda
- Suborder: Pleocyemata
- Infraorder: Brachyura
- Family: Mithracidae
- Genus: Omalacantha
- Species: O. bicornuta

Binomial name
- Omalacantha bicornuta Latreille, 1825

Synonyms
- Microphrys bicornutus Latreille, 1825; Pericera bicorna (Latreille, 1825); Pisa bicornuta Latreille, 1825; Eucinetops garthi Lemos de Castro, 1953; Microphrys garthi (Lemos de Castro, 1953); Omalacantha garthi (Lemos de Castro, 1953); Omalacantha hirsuta Streets, 1871; Pisa galibica Desbonne in Desbonne & Schramm, 1867; Pisa purpurea Desbonne in Desbonne & Schramm, 1867; Pericera bicornis de Saussure, 1857; Pericera bicorna H. Milne Edwards, 1834

= Omalacantha bicornuta =

Species of crab

Omalacantha bicornuta, often known as the speck-claw decorator crab, is a species of crab in the family Mithracidae.

== Description ==
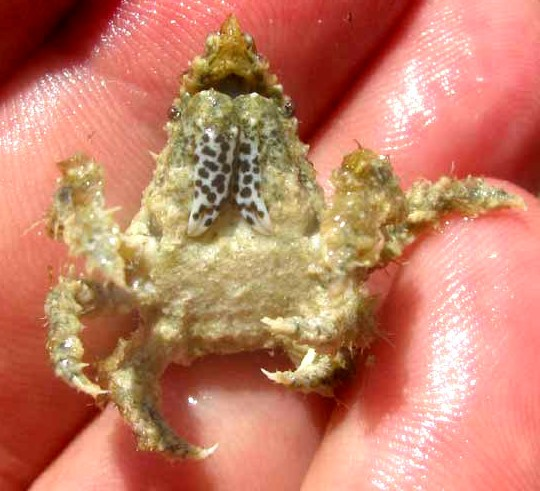
Underside of Speck-claw Decorator Crab showing speckled claws

In common with other Omalacantha species, the carapace of Omalacantha bicornuta is longer than wide and pear shaped. Its top is rough with graininess, tubercles and patches of hooked bristles, or setae. The rostrum has two strong, slightly downward-curving horns, and two rows of hooked setae along the entire length. The antennae's basal segment is very broad, forming a floor for the depression (the orbit) from which the eye-bearing stalks protrude; above the orbit there's a strong spine. The walking legs decrease in size from font to rear, and their segments are varyingly covered with setae.

Of the three accepted species of Omalacantha, O. bicornuta is by far the most commonly documented, as seen on the iNaturalist page documenting Omalacantha species observed by citizen scientists. Of the three species, Omalacantha bicornuta is the only one with such strikingly spotted claws.

== Distribution ==
Omalacantha bicornuta occurs in the Western Atlantic, in the north from shores of the United States state of North Carolina and the island of Bermuda south through the Gulf of Mexico and the Caribbean, including the Antilles, south to the coasts of Panama, Colombia, Venezuela and Brazil.

== Habitat ==
In the waters of Guadeloupe in the Caribbean, Omalacantha bicornuta occurs on rocky shores, amid coral and mangrove roots, and offshore at depths to 15 m (49 ft); reportedly, also they're found to 70 m (230 ft). Images on this page are of an individual encountered in a shallow tidal pool at low tide, along a Caribbean beach of Mexico's Quintana Roo state.

A study of Omalacantha bicornuta (using the synonym Microphrys bicornutus) on a Caribbean fringing reef found that two algal species were the crab's principal food, as well as its main decorative resource (next section). Moreover, algae adorning the crab served as a food reserve when the usual food wasn't available.

== As decorator crabs ==
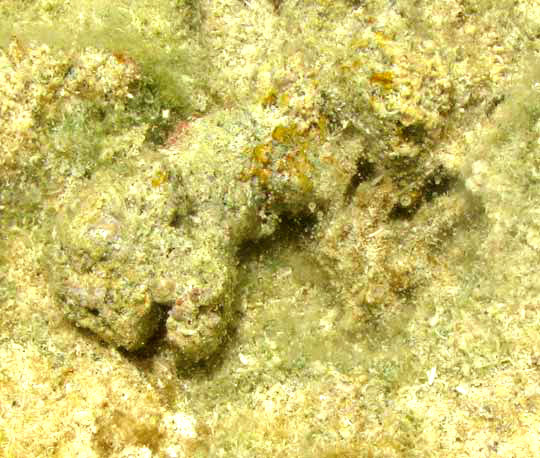
Speck-claw Decorator Crab in habitat, well camouflaged

As seen above, in its native habitat Omalacantha bicornuta is almost invisible because of its self-decoration camouflage. The crab occupies about one-twentieth of the picture and that it's located just a little to the right of the image's center.

To locate it, it helps to know that its most visible parts are two small, sand-colored, slender and sharp "fingers" at leg tips pointing toward the picture's top-right corner.

The crab is so well camouflaged because, as with many decorator crab species belonging to the family Mithracidae, it actively "decorates" itself with material from its surrounding environment. The material is snagged or "tethered" onto the hooked, hair-like setae covering its body. This adaptive behavior has been shown to benefit decorator crabs in their native environment by reducing their visibility to predators by as much as 50%.

== Taxonomy ==
In 1825 this species first was assigned to the genus Microphrys, but was transferred to Omalacantha in 2014. Genetic analysis has found that Omalacantha bicornuta is closely related to "... putative congeners with an eastern Pacific distribution," though there are minor yet consistent differences between them.

In 1825, on page 141, the original description of this taxon by Latreille was under the name Pisa bicornuta, though the text presents the genus as Pise. Also, the collection locality was given as Nouvelle Hollande, which became Australia; presumably Latreille meant "Antilles". An erratum was published in December 1828. In the same publication in which Pisa bicornuta is described, there are descriptions of Microphyrys bicornutus and Pericera bicorna, both of which are now considered synonyms of Omalacantha bicornuta .

== Etymology ==
In the genus name Omalacantha the omal- derives from the Ancient Greek ομαλός (omalós), and means "smooth, even." The -acantha is from the Greek ákanthă, meaning "thorn, prickle, spine"; probably the word has a pre-Greek origin. Thus: "smooth spine."

In the species name bicornuta the bi- is from New Latin and means "two." The -cornuta, from the Latin cornu, means "having horns." Thus, "two-horned," apparently referring to the two prominent "horns" on the rostrum of Omalacantha bicornuta.
