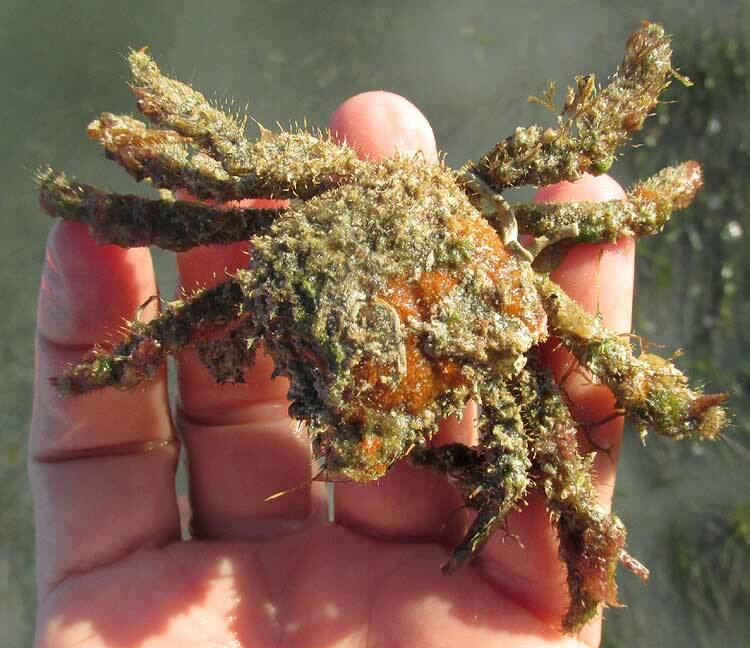

Scientific classification
- Kingdom: Animalia
- Phylum: Arthropoda
- Clade: Pancrustacea
- Class: Malacostraca
- Order: Decapoda
- Suborder: Pleocyemata
- Infraorder: Brachyura
- Family: Mithracidae
- Genus: Amphithrax
- Species: A. aculeatus

Binomial name
- Amphithrax aculeatus (Herbst, 1790)

Synonyms
- Cancer aculeatus Herbst, 1790; Mithrax aculeatus (Herbst, 1790); Mithrax trispinosus Kingsley, 1879; Cancer aculeatus Fabricius, 1793; Cancer spinipes Herbst, 1790

= Amphithrax aculeatus =

Species of crab

Amphithrax aculeatus, sometimes referred to as the hairy clinging crab, granulated spider crab or paved clinging crab, is a crab living in saltwater.

== Description ==
On the iNaturalist page showing images of Amphithrax species observed worldwide, Amphithrax aculeatus is distinguished from other species of the genus by these features:

- Its gray to brown color
- Its carapace densely covered with bristles

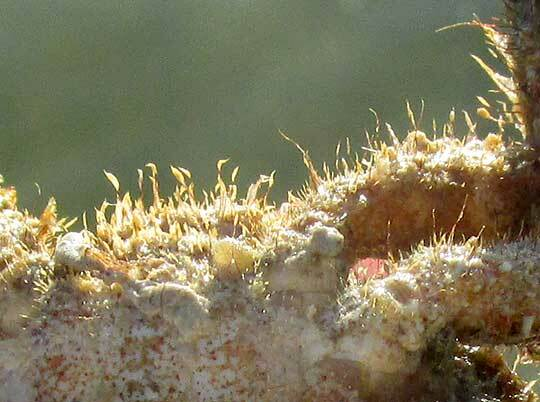
Bristles on carapace

Historically there has been uncertainty about whether Amphithrax aculeatus is the same species as Amphithrax verrucosus. In 2025, consensus tends toward accepting the two taxa as separate. Among other details separating the two similar taxa is that on Amphithrax aculeatus there are spines on the upper margin of the palm of its chelipeds (legs bearing the claws or chelae). Also, on each clawed legs' propodus (the segment composed of an immovable finger and palm) of Amphithrax aculeatus there are two to three spines.

== Distribution ==
The GBIF map displaying occurrences of georeferenced records of the species documents its occurrence throughout the Caribbean region, including coastal northern South America, Central America and Mexico's Yucatan Peninsula, as well as southern Florida, USA; also there are scattered rare occurrences elsewhere in the Americas.

== Habitat ==
In general, Amphithrax species occur among coral rocks and rubble, beneath sea anemones and in rock crevices in intertidal zones to subtidal zones of up to 60 meters depth (~200 feet). Pictures on this page portray an individual found in knee-deep water pooled inside a large, old pipe mostly collapsed from rusting, left over from digging a canal between the Gulf of Mexico and an estuary.

== Taxonomy ==
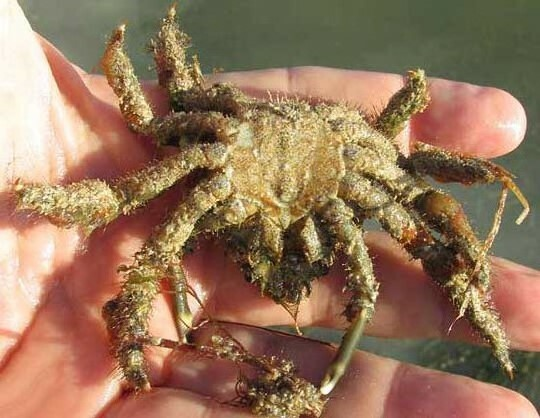
Amphithrax aculeatus, view of bottom

The genus Amphithrax was established in 2017 to accommodate species earlier assigned to the genus Mithrax. The type species of "Amphithrax aculeatus" was Cancer aculeatus, published by Johann Friedrich Wilhelm Herbst in 1790.

Some believe that records identified as Mithrax aculeatus belong to two other species which occur in the same area.

There's a typewritten note in English appended to one of the original copy's initial blank pages reading "* Perhaps no single copy of Herbst's 'Naturgeschichte der Krabben und Krebse' contains all the title pages of the different parts, and hence quotations from this work are full of inaccuracies."

== Etymology ==
The genus name Amphithrax derives from the Greek root amphi- meaning "on both sides", combined with the Latinized Greek name Mithrax, the name of the genus to which Amphithrax aculeatus earlier belonged. The name alludes to the fact that species of Amphithrax occur on both sides of the Americas and on both sides of the Atlantic Ocean.

The species name, aculeatus, is the masculine nominative Latin form of a word basically meaning "prickly".
