= Decorator crab =

Self-camouflaging animals

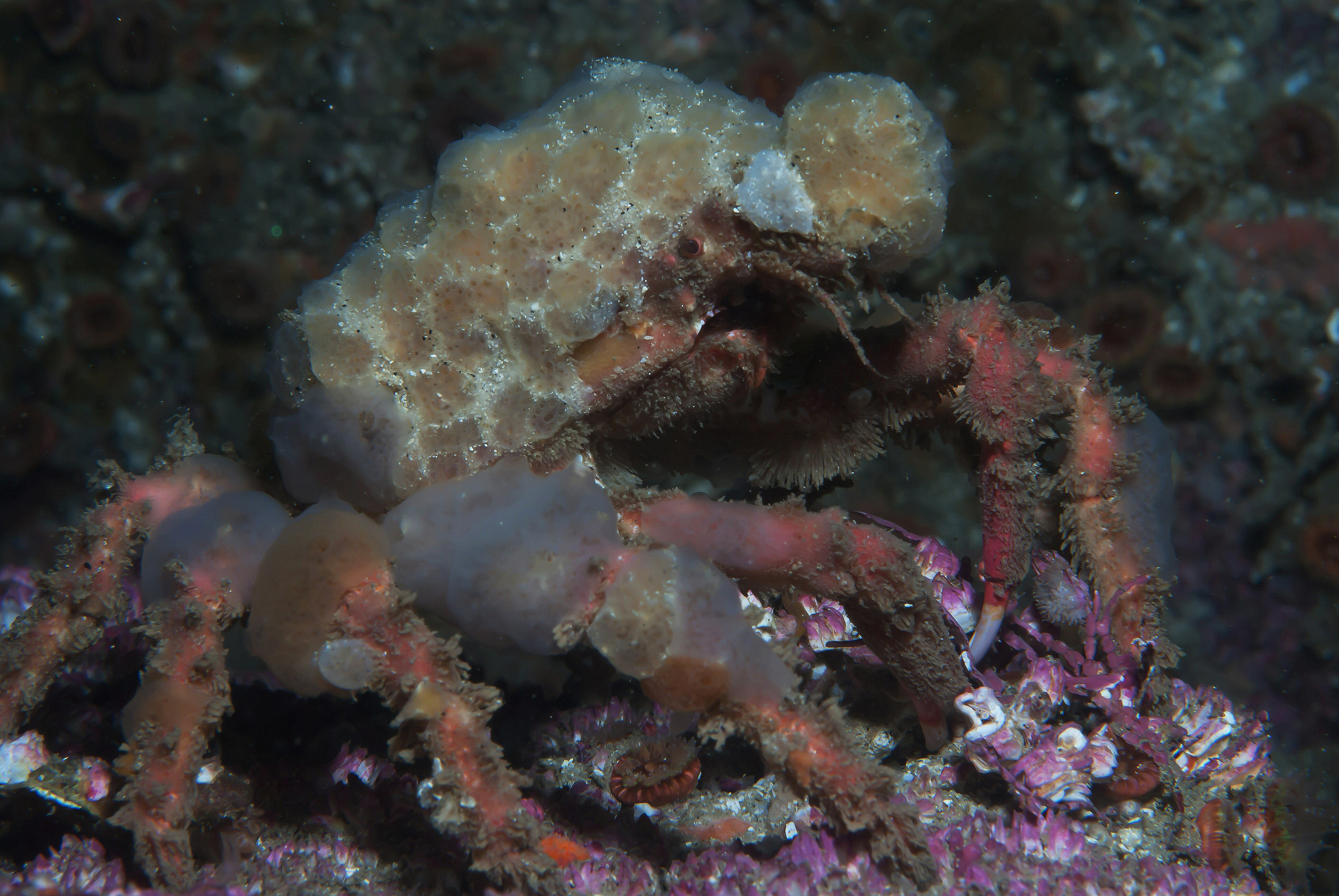
The graceful decorator crab, Oregonia gracilis

Decorator crabs are crabs of several different species, belonging to the superfamily Majoidea (not all of which are decorators), that use materials from their environment to hide from, or ward off, predators. They decorate themselves by sticking mostly sedentary animals and plants to their bodies as camouflage, or if the attached organisms are noxious, to ward off predators through aposematism.

== History ==
In 1889, William Bateson observed in detail the way that decorator crabs fix materials on their backs. He noted that "the whole proceeding is most human and purposeful", and that if a Stenorhynchus crab is cleaned, it will "immediately begin to clothe itself again with the same care and precision as before".

In his The Colours of Animals (1890), Edward Bagnall Poulton classified protective animal coloration into types such as warning colours and protective mimicry. He included self decoration under the heading "Adventitious Protection", quoting Bateson's account of decorator crabs.

In his Adaptive Coloration in Animals (1940), Hugh Bamford Cott describes self decoration under the heading "adventitious concealing coloration", also naming it "adventitious resemblance". He describes it as a device "perhaps unrivalled" for effective concealment, and points out that it is brought about and depends on "highly specialized behaviour". Further, it grades into other means of protection including "the borrowing of protection from aposematic partners" and the use of "fortified hiding-places" and burrows. Cott compares the way Australian aborigines once used water lily leaves over their faces to swim up to waterfowl until they could catch them by the legs.

== Camouflage ==
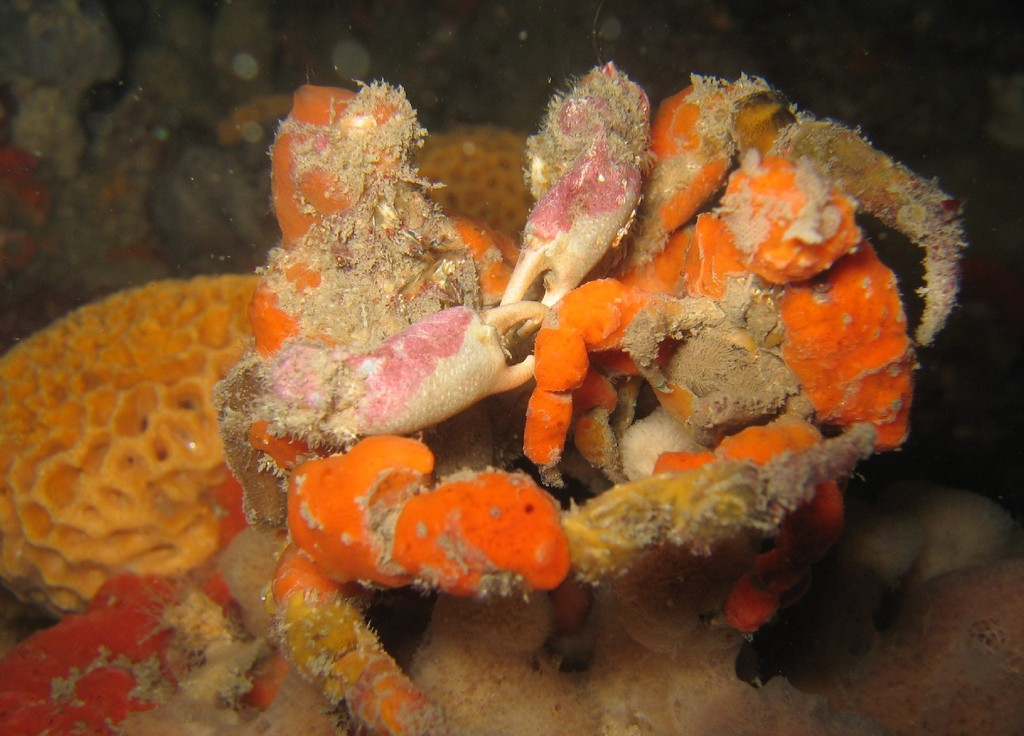
Hyastenus elatus

Cott described the decorator crabs as using "concealment afforded by masks of adventitious material", giving as example the great spider crab Hyas araneus of Britain "which disguises itself very perfectly". When H. araneus specimens were moved from an environment where all the crabs were camouflaged with short pieces of seaweed into different environments, all of them had redecorated themselves with local materials after one night. One was among corallines, and was covered with a dense bush of the Sertularia abietina (a hydrozoan). Another was on small shells and gravel, and was decorated with those. A third was among the Antedon rosaceus (a crinoid), and had broken off pieces of crinoid arms as decoration.

Bateson, in a much quoted passage, describes crabs of the genera Stenorhynchus and Inachus: the crab tears a piece of seaweed in its claws, chews it, and then rubs it firmly on its body until it catches on the "Velcro-like hooked setae", curved hairs which permit camouflage materials to be attached. The carefully chosen decoration is supplemented by cryptic behaviour, such as remaining still by day, and freezing when predators approach.

The surface of Tiarinia cornigera is covered with clusters of setae which have a rough "flowery" surface forming a shape like a haystack. This appears to encourage small organisms to attach themselves mechanically and chemically to the surface.

Kristin Hultgren and Jay Stachowicz showed in 2011 that the species of Majoidea whose juveniles camouflage themselves are scattered about the phylogenetic tree – some species do, some do not, and some do so only a little. About 75% of the Majoidea decorate themselves to some extent during at least one phase of their lifecycle, and this number includes all 8 families in that superfamily.

== Antipredator defence ==
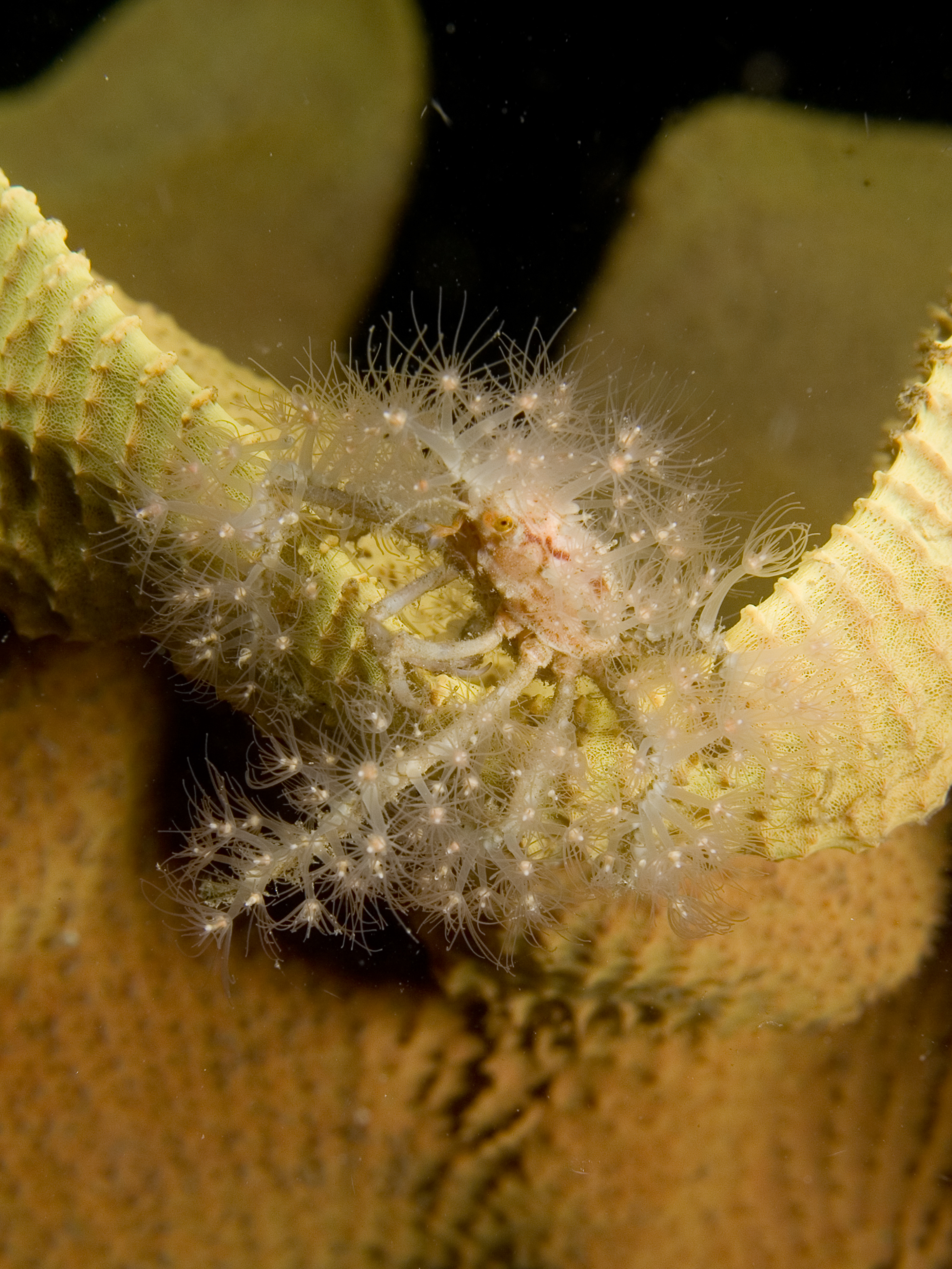
A. spinosus?, hydrozoa on I. basta

Reviewing studies conducted by different authors, Hultgren and Stachowicz showed that some species are highly specialised in their choices of camouflage. For example, Pelia tumida decorates itself only with sponges; Macropodia rostrata and Libinia dubia choose the noxious alga Dictyota menstrualis in some places, while Inachus phalangium chooses the same alga for the most exposed parts of its body; and Stenocionops furcata selects the stinging sea anemone Calliactis tricolor for its carapace. The choice of noxious or stinging organisms as decorations implies that attaching them provides protection from predators by aposematism rather than by crypsis, and there is direct observational evidence for this, e.g. that octopuses in tanks avoided decorated crabs. The relationship of crab and organisms such as sea anemones used as decoration may be mutualistic, offering protection to the crab and food to the anemone.

== Species ==
Decorator crabs come from many different genera, and are distributed worldwide. Some examples are described in the table.

Examples of decorator crabs
Species	Common names	Distribution	Decoration behaviour
Acanthonyx dentatus	Toothed crab	South Africa	
Naxia tumida	Little seaweed crab	Australia and surrounding waters	
Macropodia rostrata	Long-legged spider crab	Coasts of Europe, Mediterranean, Black Sea	Chooses the chemically noxious alga Dictyota linearis
Stenocionops furcata	Furcate spider crab	Atlantic coast of North America	Chooses stinging anemone Calliactis tricolor
Oregonia gracilis	Graceful decorator crab	Northern Pacific Ocean	
Hyastenus elatus	Sponge decorator crab	Australia	Decorates with aposematic sponges
Achaeus spinosus	Spider crab	Indonesia, Philippines, Japan	Can use stinging hydrozoa
Maja crispata	Small spider crab	Eastern Atlantic, Mediterranean Sea	
Herbstia parvifrons	Crevice spider crab	Pacific coast of North America	Always uses chemically noxious sponges
Libinia emarginata	Portly or nine-spined spider crab	Atlantic coast of North America	
Libinia dubia	Longnose spider crab	Atlantic coast of North America	Uses noxious alga Dictyota menstrualis
Loxorhynchus crispatus	Masking or moss crab	Eastern Pacific Ocean	Prefers to decorate with bryozoan Bugula neritina
Hyas araneus	Great spider crab	North Atlantic, North Sea	
Camposcia retusa	Harlequin crab or spider decorator crab	Indonesia	
Stenorhynchus seticornis	Yellowline arrow crab	Caribbean	Chooses materials for best camouflage against local background
