= A. japonicus =

A. japonicus may refer to:

- Acetes japonicus, a shrimp species
- Achaeus japonicus, the orang-utan crab
- Aedes japonicus, a mosquito species
- Analipus japonicus, a brown alga species
- Apostichopus japonicus, a sea cucumber species
- Argyrosomus japonicus, the mulloway, jewfish or dusky kob, a fish species found in coastal waters surrounding Australia, Africa, India, Pakistan, China, Korea and Japan
- Apristurus japonicus, a catshark species
