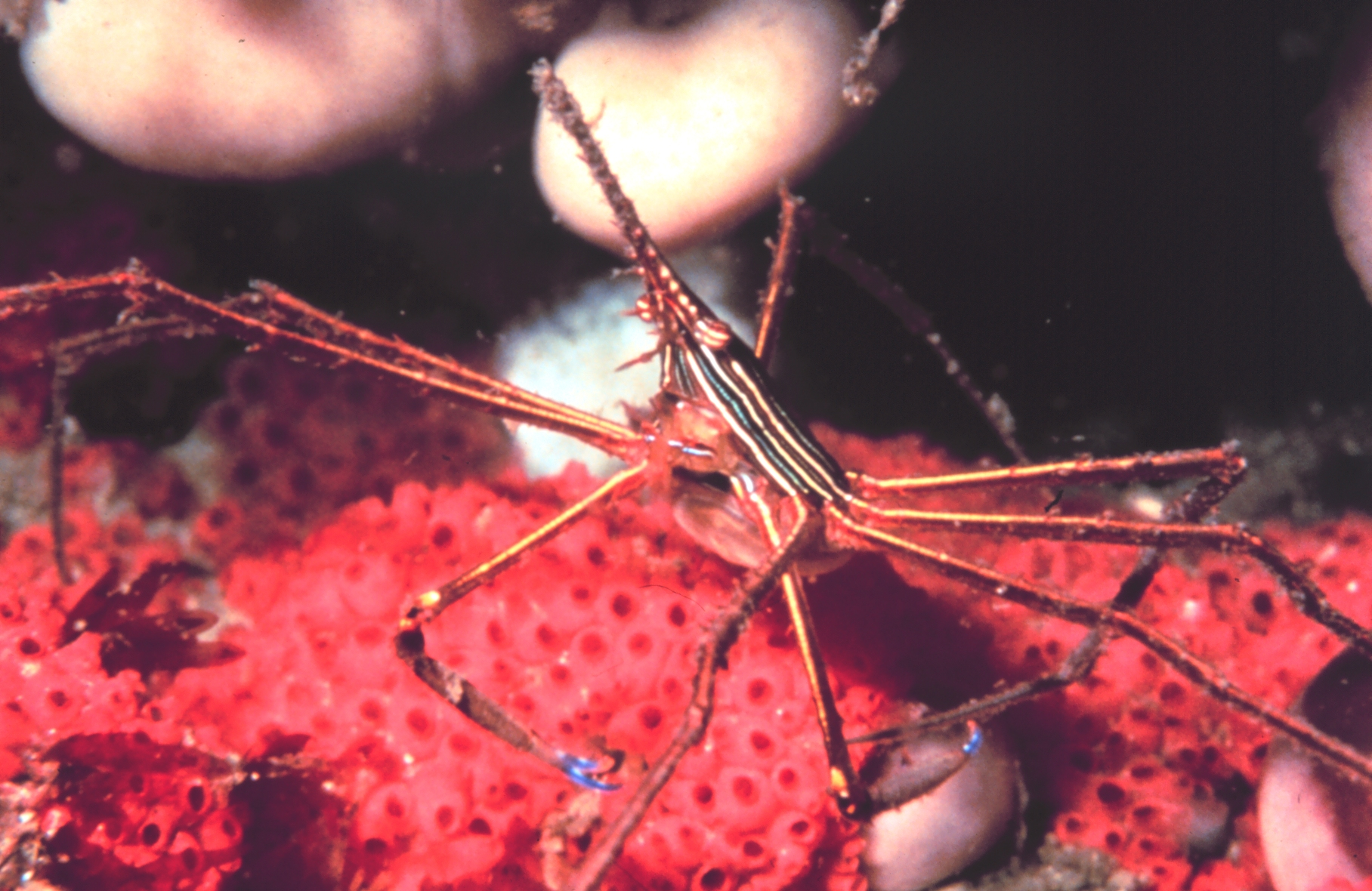

Scientific classification
- Kingdom: Animalia
- Phylum: Arthropoda
- Clade: Pancrustacea
- Class: Malacostraca
- Order: Decapoda
- Suborder: Pleocyemata
- Infraorder: Brachyura
- Family: Inachidae
- Genus: Stenorhynchus
- Species: S. seticornis

Binomial name
- Stenorhynchus seticornis (Herbst, 1788)

= Stenorhynchus seticornis =

Species of crab

Stenorhynchus seticornis, the yellowline arrow crab or simply arrow crab, is a species of marine crab.

== Taxonomy ==
Stenorhynchus seticornis was first described by Johann Friedrich Wilhelm Herbst in 1788, under the name Cancer seticornis. It was also described as "Cancer sagittarius" by Johan Christian Fabricius in 1793, a name which is now a junior synonym of S. seticornis. Pierre André Latreille erected the genus Stenorhynchus (originally mis-spelt Stenorynchus) in 1818, and S. seticornis was confirmed as the type species by the International Commission on Zoological Nomenclature in 1966.

== Description ==
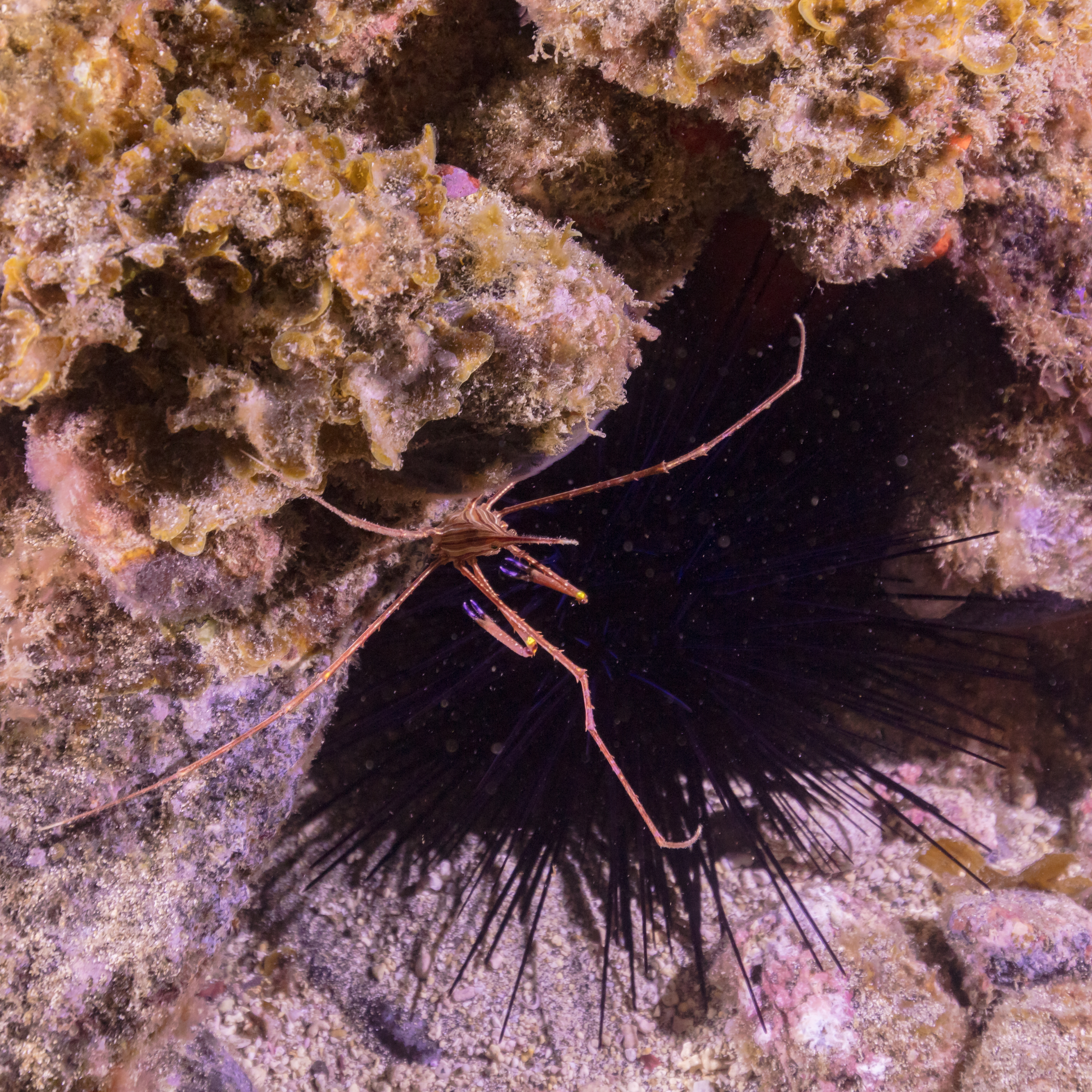
S. seticornis off Tenerife

The body of S. seticornis is triangular, and the rostrum is drawn out into a long point with serrate edges. The legs are also long and thin, up to 10 cm (3.9 in) across, and the animal's carapace may be up to 6 cm (2.4 in) long. Colouration is variable in this species; the body may be golden, yellow or cream, marked with brown, black or iridescent-blue lines; the legs are reddish or yellow, and the claws are blue or violet. This species presents as diagnostic features: triangular body with long pointed snout (rostrum), carapace decorated with fine dark lines and claws often have violet tips. S. seticornis is most commonly associated with anemones, in groups ranging from one to six individuals in south-eastern Brazil.

== Distribution ==
Stenorhynchus seticornis is commonly found in the shallow sub-tidal on rock bottoms, corals, calcareous algae, and also on soft sediments, such as shelly gravel and sand. Its geographical distribution is restricted to the Occidental Atlantic, from North Carolina to Argentina. Stenorhynchus seticornis is found in the western Atlantic Ocean, from North Carolina and Bermuda to Brazil, including throughout the Caribbean Sea. It lives on coral reefs at depths of 10–30 feet (3.0–9.1 m).

== Ecology and behaviour ==
S. seticornis is nocturnal and territorial. The species has displayed notable negative phototaxis, meaning the organism prefers to avoid sunlight, and changes location during the day and nighttime. It eats small feather duster worms and other coral reef invertebrates. This crab is commonly kept in reef aquariums to control bristle worm populations.

S. seticornis is one of a number of different invertebrates that are found living in association with the sea anemone, Lebrunia danae. It is often found among the anemone's pseudotentacles along with Pederson's cleaning shrimp (Ancylomenes pedersoni) and the spotted cleaner shrimp (Periclimenes yucatanicus). The species is also notable for its propensity to decorate its body by attaching materials as camouflage, or if the attached organisms are noxious, to ward off predators through aposematism. There have been a considerable number of reports regarding cleaning symbiosis among reef fish, moray eels, and squirrelfish. This is a somewhat unexpected relationship as moray eels and squirrelfish can be considered dangerous clients, because crabs are important elements of their diets. This behavior has only been observed in the natural environment in Brazilian waters but it is believed that this behavior also exists throughout its distribution.

== Life cycle and reproduction ==
During mating, the male places a spermatophore on the female, which she uses to fertilise her eggs. These fertilised eggs are then carried on the female's pleopods until they are ready to hatch into zoea larvae. These swim towards the ocean surface and feed on plankton. They grow through a series of moults, and eventually metamorphose into the adult form. When mature, the spermatozoa of S. seticornis show five lateral arms, similar to the sperm morphology of Inachus phalangium.

=== Breeding period ===
Climate majorly regulates the breeding period of the arrow crab. Seasonal variation of water temperature and sunlight duration are considered as the most important variables determining the breeding period of arrow crabs.

There is a positive relationship between fecundity and the size of the parental female. In fact, the size of the female is the key variable in determining the number of eggs per batch. The female also determines the reproductive output of arrow crabs.

=== Larval stage ===
Larvae that have grown in shallow water differ from larvae that grow in deeper water. The key difference is in the setation of the endopodite of the maxilla.

== See also ==
- Decorator crab
