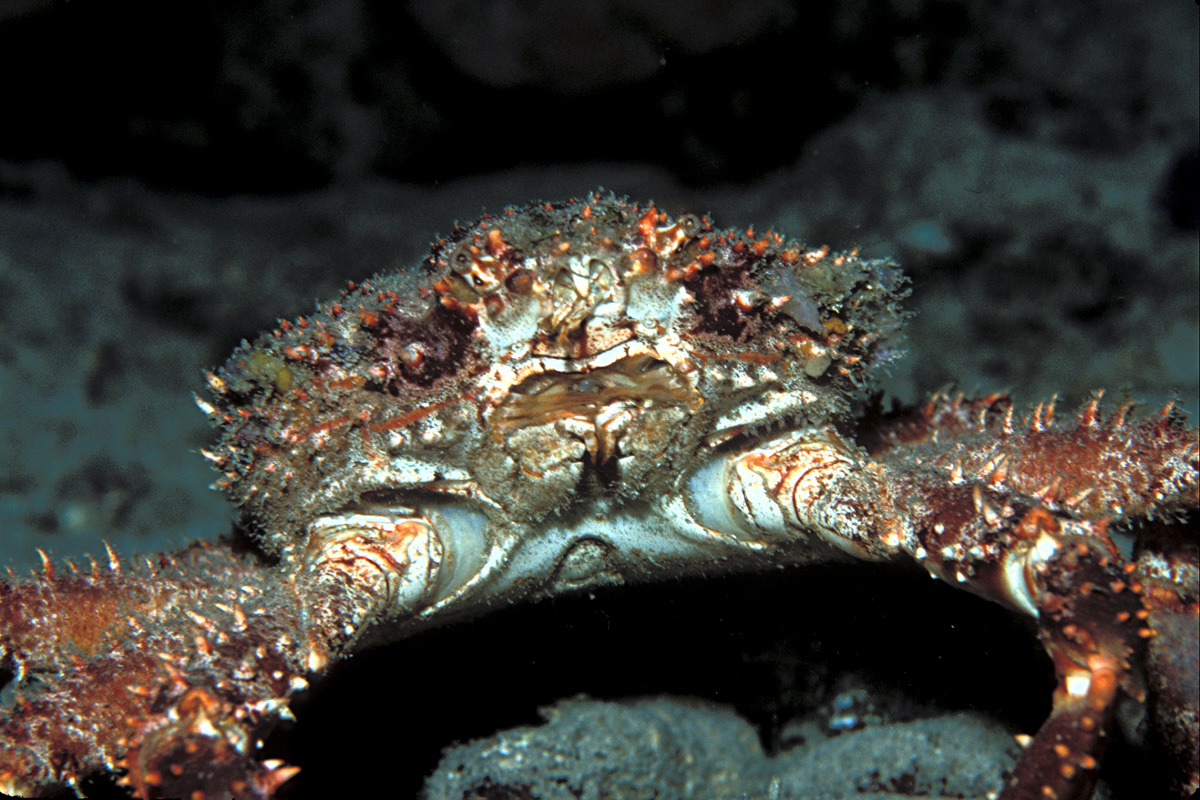
- Mithrax aculeatus

Scientific classification
- Kingdom: Animalia
- Phylum: Arthropoda
- Class: Malacostraca
- Order: Decapoda
- Suborder: Pleocyemata
- Infraorder: Brachyura
- Family: Mithracidae
- Genus: Mithrax; Latreille, 1816

Synonyms
- Mitrax H. Milne Edwards, 1838

= Mithrax =

Genus of crabs

Mithrax is a genus of spider crabs in the family Mithracidae.

== Species ==
Mithrax contains the following species:

- †Mithrax arawakum Klompmaker, Portell, Klier, Prueter & Tucker, 2015
- Mithrax hispidus (Herbst, 1790)
- Mithrax pleuracanthus Stimpson, 1871
- Mithrax tortugae Rathbun, 1920
- †Mithrax unguis Portell & Collins, 2004
