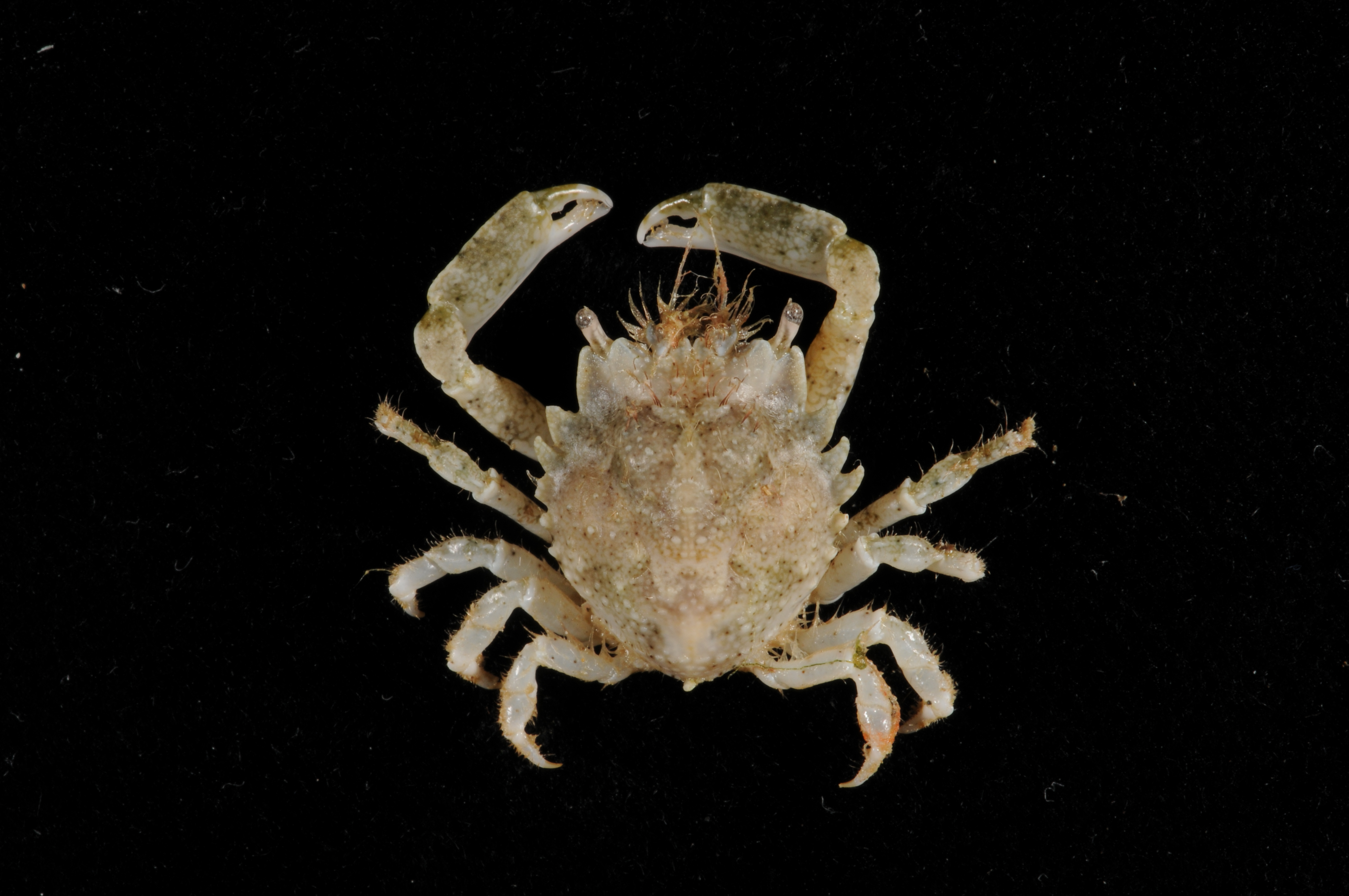
- Pitho iherminieri from Guadeloupe

Scientific classification
- Kingdom: Animalia
- Phylum: Arthropoda
- Clade: Pancrustacea
- Class: Malacostraca
- Order: Decapoda
- Suborder: Pleocyemata
- Infraorder: Brachyura
- Family: Mithracidae
- Genus: Pitho; Bell, 1836

Type species
- Pitho sexdentata Bell, 1836

= Pitho =

Genus of spider crab

Pitho is a genus of spider crabs in the family Mithracidae.

== Description ==
Crabs in the genus Pitho have carapaces that are wide and truncated in the front and come to a rounded point at the rear. The rostrum is short and comes to two teeth. The antennae are short and surrounded by straight, stiff hairs. The chelipeds are partially spoon-shaped and relatively long, similar to other spider crabs.

== Distribution ==
In the Atlantic Ocean, members of the genus Pitho are found from Beaufort, North Carolina to Cape St. Roque, Brazil, including in the Gulf of Mexico. Pacific species are range from Magdalena Bay, California to Panama. They are also found around the Galapagos Islands.

== List of species ==
There are currently 10 accepted species within the genus:

- Pitho aculeata (Gibbes, 1850) - Massive urn crab
- Pitho anisodon (von Marten, 1872) - Oval urn crab
- Pitho dispar (Rathbun, 1925)
- Pitho laevigata (A. Milne-Edwards, 1875) - Eggshell urn crab
- Pitho lherminieri (Desbonne, 1867) - Broadback urn crab
- Pitho mirabilis (Herbst, 1794)
- Pitho picteti (de Saussure, 1853)
- Pitho quadridentata (Miers, 1879)
- Pitho quinquedentata (Bell, 1836)
- Pitho sexdentata (Bell, 1836)
