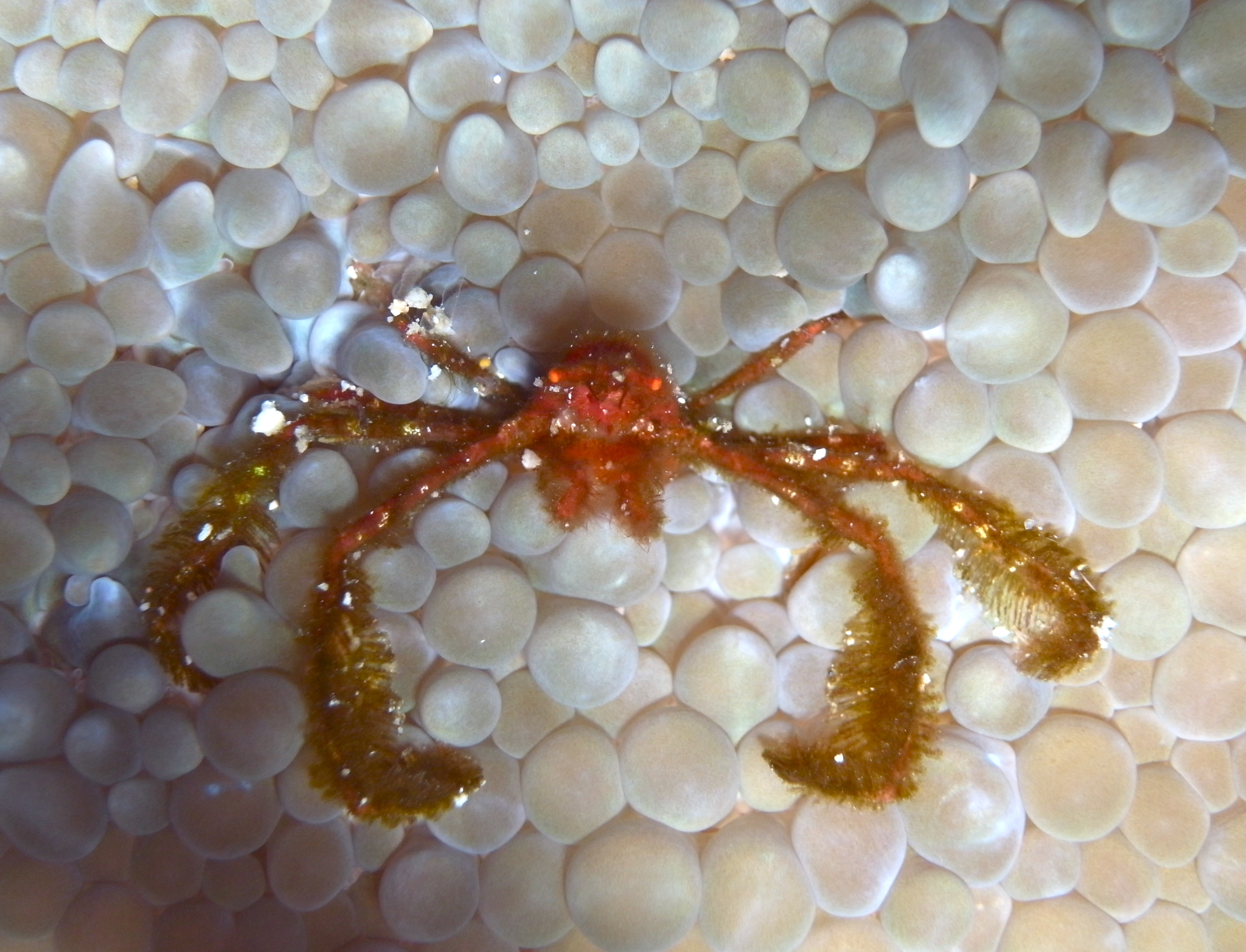

Scientific classification
- Kingdom: Animalia
- Phylum: Arthropoda
- Clade: Pancrustacea
- Class: Malacostraca
- Order: Decapoda
- Suborder: Pleocyemata
- Infraorder: Brachyura
- Family: Inachidae
- Genus: Achaeus
- Species: A. japonicus

Binomial name
- Achaeus japonicus (De Haan, 1839)

Synonyms
- Inachus japonicus De Haan, 1839

= Achaeus japonicus =

Species of crab

Achaeus japonicus, sometimes known as the orang-utan crab, is a crab of the family Inachidae (spider crabs or decorator crabs) which can be observed in tropical waters of the central Indo-Pacific.

With a carapace of only about 2 centimetres or 0.8 inches in diameter, it has relatively long arms, which are thickly covered with fine hairs, red or reddish brown in colour, and often laden with small bits of debris for further camouflage. It is frequently, but not always, found in association with the bubble coral Plerogyra sinuosa.

Humann and DeLoach classify the orang-utan crab as "Oncinopus sp. 1" and assert it was "formerly classified" as Achaeus japonicus, though they describe their own genus identification as "tentative."
