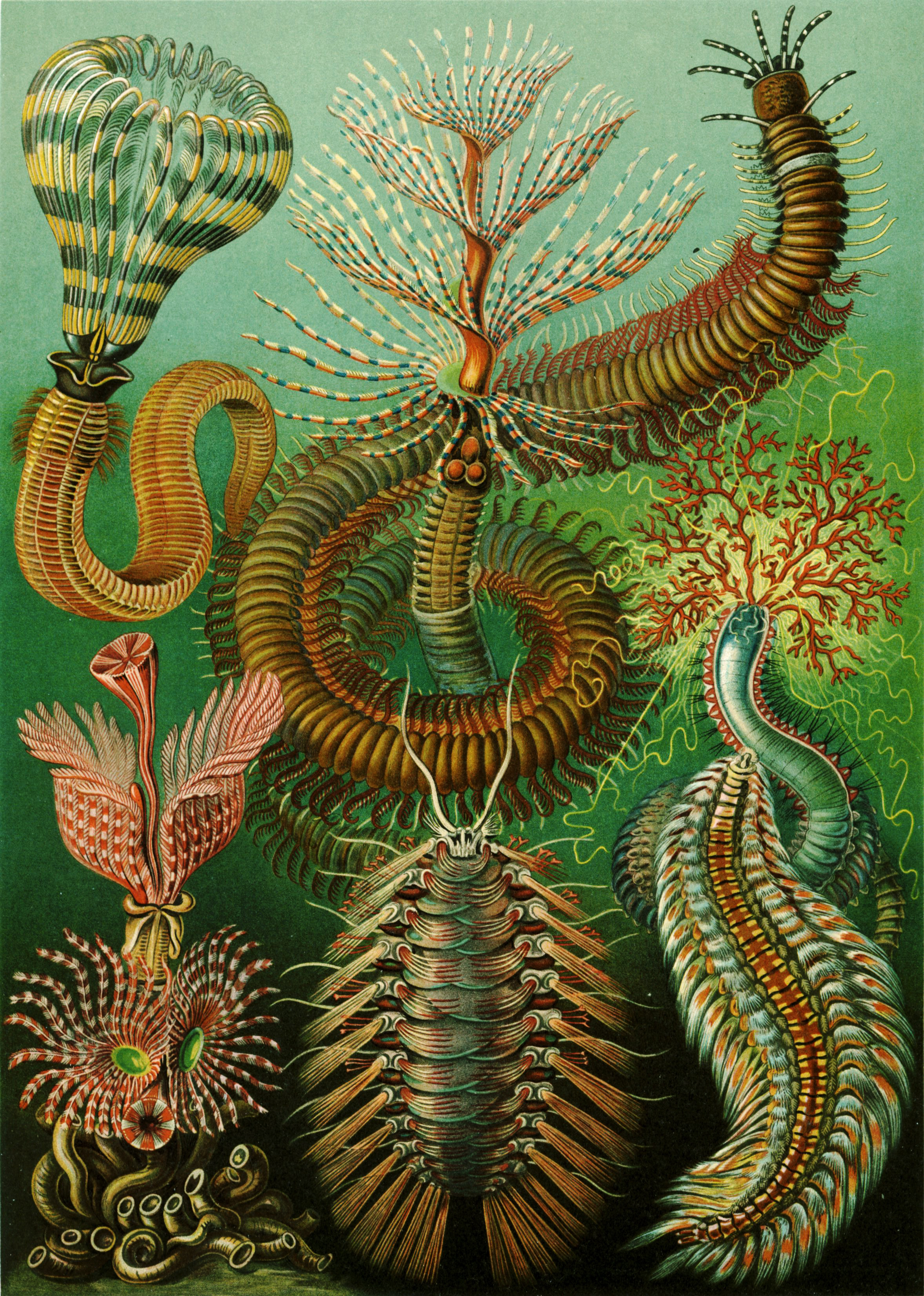
- Chaetopoda, H. norvegica is at bottom left.

Scientific classification
- Kingdom: Animalia
- Phylum: Annelida
- Clade: Pleistoannelida
- Clade: Sedentaria
- Order: Sabellida
- Family: Serpulidae
- Genus: Hydroides
- Species: H. norvegica

Binomial name
- Hydroides norvegica Gunnerus, 1768

Synonyms
- H. norvegicus, Gunnerus, 1768

= Hydroides norvegica =

Species of annelid worm

Hydroides norvegica is a species of tube-forming annelid worm in the family Serpulidae. It is found on submerged rocks, shells, piles and boats in many coastal areas around the world. It is the type species of the genus Hydroides.

Polychaetes, or marine bristle worms, have elongated bodies divided into many segments. Each segment may bear setae (bristles) and parapodia (paddle-like appendages). Some species live freely, either swimming, crawling or burrowing, and these are known as "errant". Others live permanently in tubes, either calcareous or parchment-like, and these are known as "sedentary".

== Description ==
This serpulid worm lives inside a protective calcareous tube. The worm has about one hundred segments each bearing chitinous bristles called chaetae. There are twelve to nineteen pairs of tentacles surrounding the operculum, which looks slantingly cut. The head of the worm protrudes from the tube and is surrounded by a crown of tentacles. It looks like a low, round cup, with a fairly small mouth in the middle, and 16 small teeth or beams around the head’s edge. The worm grows to up to thirty millimetres long. The abdomen is red and crown is also red with white cross-bands. The operculum is either red or has two red rings. Two distinguishing features are the opercular whorl and the chaetae forming a collar. The tube is white and chalky, about fifty millimetres long and two millimetres wide. It is thin walled with many curved growth lines on the sides. The surface is smooth and often has distinct growth rings. The tube meanders irregularly over the substrate.

== Distribution ==
This species is found in the Atlantic Ocean, the Mediterranean Sea, the Indian Ocean, the Persian Gulf and the Red Sea. It is found from the eulittoral zone to around 350 metres and is a true marine species. This is in contrast to the harbour fouling invasive species Hydroides elegans with which it is sometimes confused.

== Biology ==
A study was made of the rate of growth of H. norvegica and other sedentary organisms in Madras Harbour, India. The worms attached themselves in very large numbers to suitable surfaces and secreted translucent tubes which later becomes calcareous. The tubes grew vigorously along the surface of the substrate but were so crowded that they sometimes grew vertically and were subsequently broken off by wave action. In the laboratory, tanks containing artificially fertilized eggs were kept and the worms underwent all the normal stages of development and attained a very large size (ten centimetres long). Individuals became mature and started breeding within ninety days of settling on the substrate.

== Marine fouling ==
A study was made in Hawaii into the species involved in fouling man made structures immersed in the sea at depths of fifty and one hundred feet. The dominant species involved were found to be the little striped barnacle, Balanus amphitrite, the crested oyster, Ostrea equestris and Hydroides norvegica and a stable community was produced after two to four months at fifty feet and slightly longer at one hundred feet. In four months, H. norvegica reached a length of three centimetres, and with the other fouling organisms covered the panels that were used. A late arriving fouling organism was the brown alga, Padina japonica. This was not present till the fourth month but was dominant after nine months, extending to nine centimetres in diameter and displacing the other organisms.
