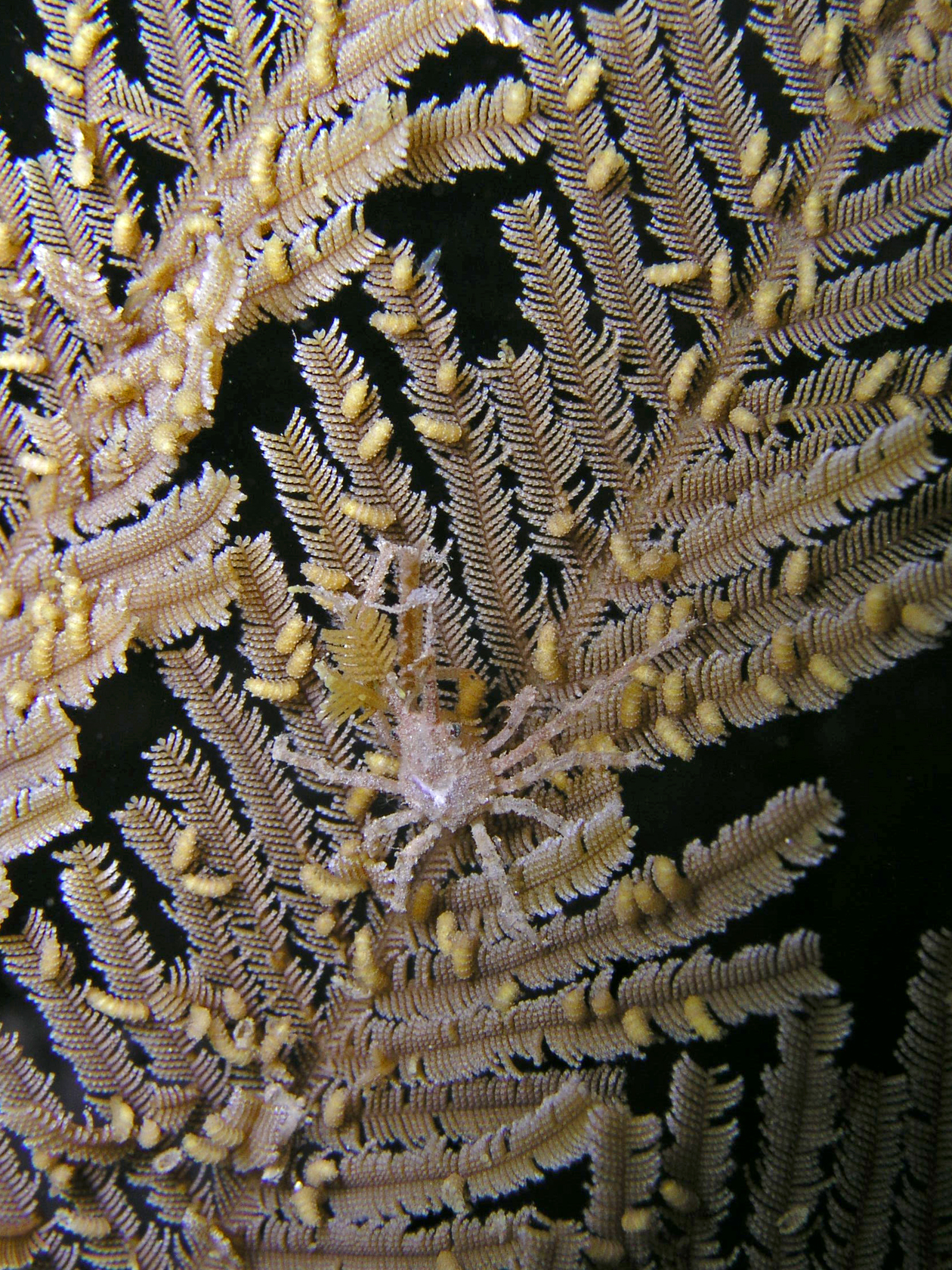
- H. bispinosus on the hydroid Aglaophenia cupressina

Scientific classification
- Domain: Eukaryota
- Kingdom: Animalia
- Phylum: Arthropoda
- Class: Malacostraca
- Order: Decapoda
- Suborder: Pleocyemata
- Infraorder: Brachyura
- Family: Epialtidae
- Genus: Hyastenus
- Species: H. bispinosus

Binomial name
- Hyastenus bispinosus Buitendijk, 1939

= Hyastenus bispinosus =

Species of crab

Hyastenus bispinosus is a species of crab in the family Epialtidae, found around Ambon, the Banda Islands, Timor, and the Lembeh Strait off Sulawesi.
