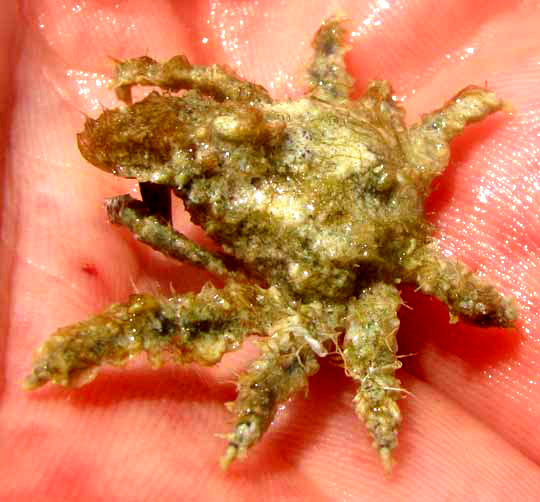
- Speck-claw Decorator Crab, top view

Scientific classification
- Kingdom: Animalia
- Phylum: Arthropoda
- Clade: Pancrustacea
- Class: Malacostraca
- Order: Decapoda
- Suborder: Pleocyemata
- Infraorder: Brachyura
- Family: Mithracidae
- Genus: Omalacantha; Streets, 1871

Type species
- Omalacantha hirsuta Streets, 1871

Synonyms
- Milnia Stimpson, 1860

= Omalacantha =

Genus of crustaceans

Omalacantha is a genus in the family of crustaceans known as the Mithracidae.

== Description ==
Species in the genus Omalacantha display these features:

- Their carapaces are longer than wide, and pear shaped.
- Their tops are rough with graininess, tubercles and patches of hooked bristles, or setae.
- Rostrums have two strong, slightly downward-curving horns, and two rows of hooked setae along their entire lengths.
- The antennae's basal segments are very broad, forming floors for the depressions (the orbits) from which the eye-bearing stalks protrude
- Above each orbit there's a strong spine.
- Walking legs decrease in size from font to rear, and their segments are varyingly covered with setae.

== Distribution ==
The GBIF map showing locations of georeferenced records of species of Omalacantha indicate that members of the genus naturally occur in western Atlantic and Gulf of Mexico waters from about the US state of North Carolina south to southern Brazil.

== Phylogeny ==
Genetic analysis of species of the superfamily Majoidea of the family Mithracidae found that the genus Omalacantha grouped in the same clade as the genus Microphrys, with which it is very similar morphologically, and that that clade was sister to the genus Teleophrys. It also confirmed that Omalacantha can stand as a valid genus.

== Species ==
Omalacantha comprised the following species as of 2025:

- Omalacantha antillensis Rathbun
- Omalacantha bicornuta ( Latreille, 1825)
- Omalacantha interrupta Rathbun
