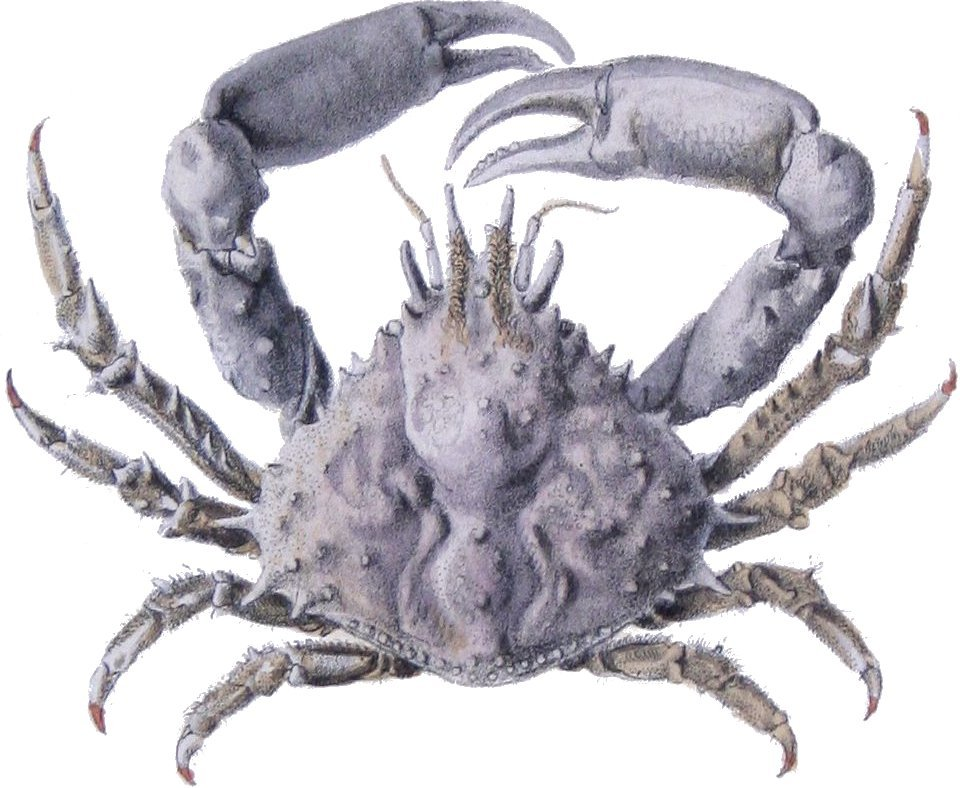

Scientific classification
- Kingdom: Animalia
- Phylum: Arthropoda
- Clade: Pancrustacea
- Class: Malacostraca
- Order: Decapoda
- Suborder: Pleocyemata
- Infraorder: Brachyura
- Family: Majidae
- Genus: Microphrys
- Species: M. weddelli

Binomial name
- Microphrys weddelli H. Milne-Edwards, 1851

= Microphrys weddelli =

Species of crab

Microphrys weddelli is a species of crab in the family Majidae.
