= Hydroides =

Hydroides tubeworm

Scientific classification
- Domain: Eukaryota
- Kingdom: Animalia
- Phylum: Annelida
- Clade: Pleistoannelida
- Clade: Sedentaria
- Order: Sabellida
- Family: Serpulidae
- Subfamily: Serpulinae
- Genus: Hydroides; Gunnerus, 1768

Genus of annelids

Hydroides is a genus of tube-forming serpulid worms found on submerged saltwater rocks, shells, and boats in many coastal areas around the world.

== Species ==
It contains the following species:

- Hydroides bispinosa (Bush, 1910)
- Hydroides brachyacantha (Rioja, 1863)
- Hydroides crucigera (Moerch, 1863)
- Hydroides dianthus (Verrill, 1873)
- Hydroides dirampha (Mörch, 1863)
- Hydroides elegans (Haswell, 1883)
- Hydroides ezoensis (Okuda, 1934)
- Hydroides huanghaiensis (Sun & Yang, 2000)
- Hydroides lirs (Kupriyanova, Sun, ten Hove, Wong & Rouse, 2015)
- Hydroides longispinosa (Chen & Wu, 1980)
- Hydroides microtis (Mörch, 1863)
- Hydroides norvegica (Gunnerus, 1768)
- Hydroides parva (Treadwell, 1902)
- Hydroides protulicola (Benedict, 1887)
- Hydroides sanctaecrucis (Krøyer in Mörch, 1863)
- Hydroides xishaensis (Chen & Wu, 1978)

== Ecology ==
Parasites of Hydroides include sea snails from the genus Fargoa.
