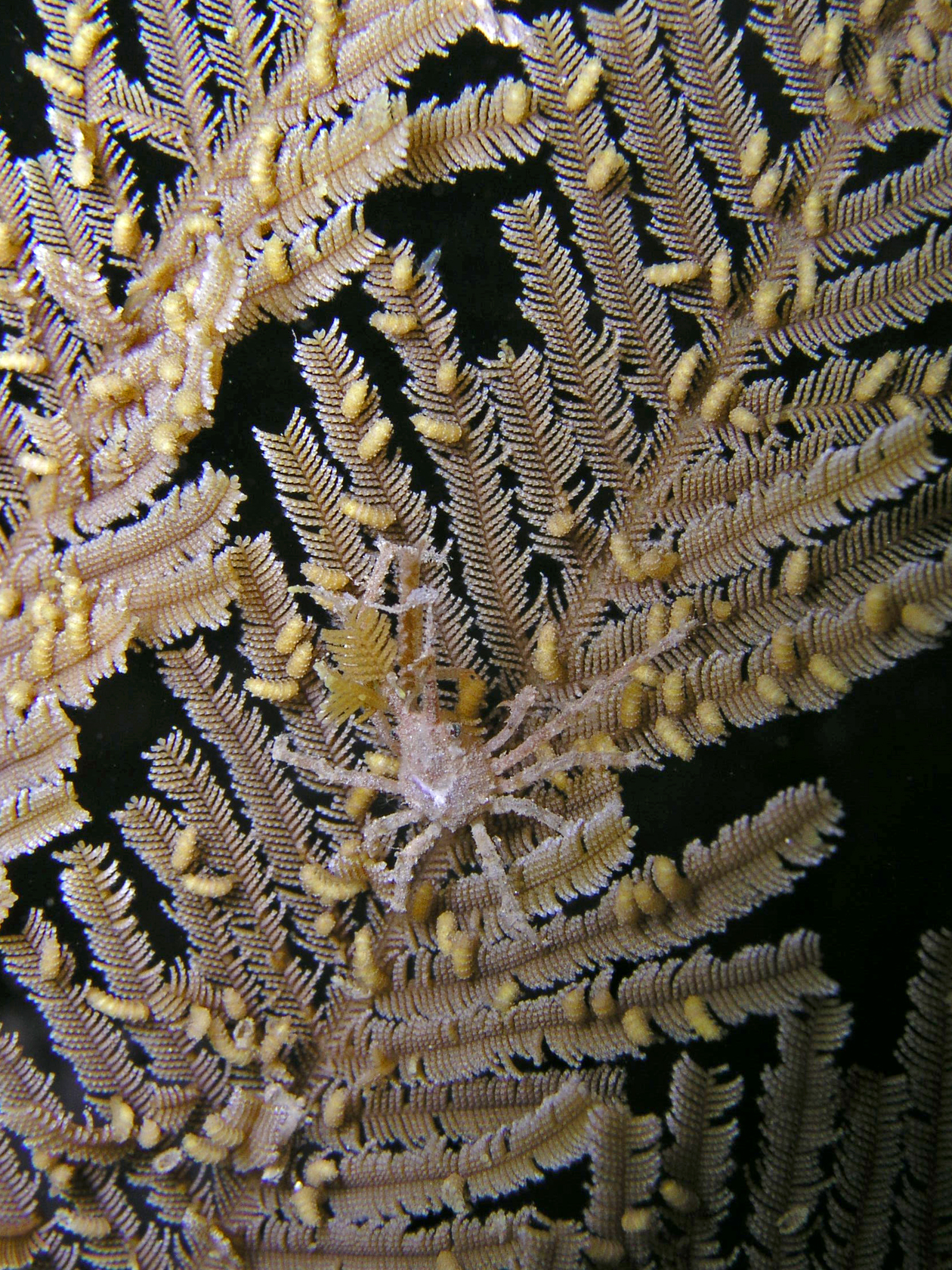
- H. bispinosus on the hydroid Aglaophenia cupressina

Scientific classification
- Kingdom: Animalia
- Phylum: Arthropoda
- Clade: Pancrustacea
- Class: Malacostraca
- Order: Decapoda
- Suborder: Pleocyemata
- Infraorder: Brachyura
- Family: Epialtidae
- Subfamily: Pisinae
- Genus: Hyastenus; White, 1847

Type species
- Hyastenus sebae White, 1847

= Hyastenus =

Genus of crabs

Hyastenus is a genus of crabs in the family Epialtidae, subfamily Pisinae, containing the following extant species:

- Hyastenus ambonensis Griffin & Tranter, 1986
- Hyastenus aries (Latreille, 1825)
- Hyastenus auctus Rathbun, 1916
- Hyastenus biformis Rathbun, 1916
- Hyastenus bispinosus Buitendijk, 1939
- Hyastenus borradailei (Rathbun, 1907)
- Hyastenus brachychirus Nobili, 1899
- Hyastenus brevicornis Ortmann, 1894
- Hyastenus brockii de Man, 1887
- Hyastenus campbelli Griffin & Tranter, 1986
- Hyastenus consobrinus A. Milne-Edwards, 1895
- Hyastenus convexus Miers, 1884
- Hyastenus cornigerus Sakai, 1938
- Hyastenus cracentis Griffin & Tranter, 1986
- Hyastenus diacanthus (De Haan, 1839)
- Hyastenus elatus Griffin & Tranter, 1986
- Hyastenus elongatus Ortmann, 1893
- Hyastenus espinosus (Borradaile, 1903)
- Hyastenus fracterculus Rathbun, 1916
- Hyastenus gracilimanus Yang & Dai, 1994
- Hyastenus hendersoni (Laurie, 1906)
- Hyastenus hilgendorfi de Man, 1887
- Hyastenus inermis (Rathbun, 1911)
- Hyastenus kyusyuensis (Yokoya, 1933)
- Hyastenus mindoro Griffin & Tranter, 1986
- Hyastenus minutus Buitendijk, 1939
- Hyastenus planasius (Adams & White, 1848)
- Hyastenus pleione (Herbst, 1803)
- Hyastenus scrobiculatus Rathbun, 1916
- Hyastenus sebae White, 1847
- Hyastenus sinope (Adams & White, 1848)
- Hyastenus spinosus A. Milne-Edwards, 1872
- Hyastenus subinermis Zehntner, 1894
- Hyastenus ternatensis Buitendijk, 1939
- Hyastenus truncatipes (Miers, 1879)
- Hyastenus uncifer Calman, 1900
- Hyastenus whitei Griffin, 1976

One further fossil species is known.
