= Hydroides elegans =

Hydroides tubeworm

Scientific classification
- Domain: Eukaryota
- Kingdom: Animalia
- Phylum: Annelida
- Clade: Pleistoannelida
- Clade: Sedentaria
- Order: Sabellida
- Family: Serpulidae
- Genus: Hydroides
- Species: H. elegans

Binomial name
- Hydroides elegans (Haswell, 1883)

Synonyms
- Eupomatus elegans Haswell, 1883

Species of annelid

Hydroides elegans is a species of tube-forming serpulid worms. The species was first described in 1883 by William Aitcheson Haswell as Eupomatus elegans.

It is a harbour fouling invasive species, in contrast with Hydroides norvegica with which it is sometimes confused.

Hyastenus hilgendorfi is a species of "decorator crab" which uses other organisms to cover its body and in a study in the Suez Canal H. elegans was one of the most frequent epibionts.

Hydroides elegans is well known to settle on man-made objects, build large aggregations of calcerous tubes, and perform calcification, which often leads to difficulties in extracting fossil fuels. Since they are an invasive species, they must require the contact of a bacterial biofilm to begin settlement.
