= Hyastenus borradailei =

Scientific classification
- Kingdom: Animalia
- Phylum: Arthropoda
- Clade: Pancrustacea
- Class: Malacostraca
- Order: Decapoda
- Suborder: Pleocyemata
- Infraorder: Brachyura
- Family: Epialtidae
- Genus: Hyastenus
- Species: H. borradailei

Binomial name
- Hyastenus borradailei (Rathbun, 1907)

Synonyms
- Halimus borradailei Rathbun, 1907

Species of crab

Hyastenus borradailei, sometimes called white-v hydroid spider crab, is a small crustacean belonging to the Epialtidae family. It is native to the Indo-Pacific.
