= Self-decoration camouflage =

Camouflage by attaching local materials to one's body

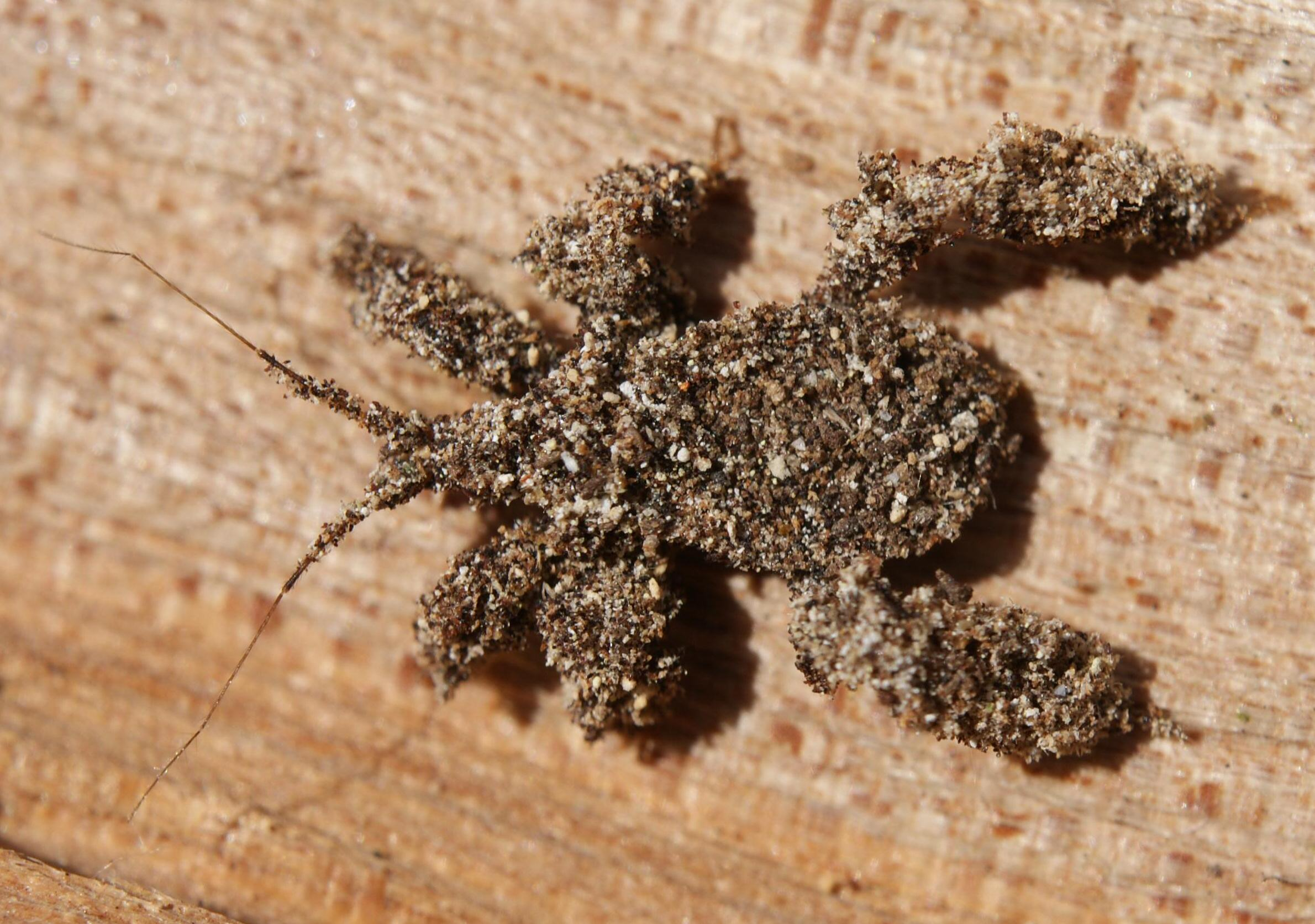
Reduvius personatus, the masked hunter bug nymph, camouflaged with grains of sand

Self-decoration camouflage is a method of camouflage in which animals or soldiers select materials, sometimes living, from the environment and attach these to themselves for concealment.

The method was described in 1889 by William Bateson, who observed Stenorhynchus decorator crabs. It was classified as "adventitious protection" by Edward Bagnall Poulton in 1890, and as "adventitious concealing coloration" or "adventitious resemblance" by Hugh Bamford Cott in 1940, who compared it to the way Australian aborigines stalked waterfowl, covering their faces with water lily leaves.

Among animals, self-decoration is found in decorator crabs, some insects such as caddis flies and the masked hunter bug, and occasionally also in octopuses. In military camouflage, it is seen in the use of ghillie suits by snipers and the helmet nets of soldiers more generally, when these are camouflaged by inserting grass and other local plant materials, and in a more general way by the use of decorated camouflage netting over vehicles, gun emplacements and observation posts.

== History ==
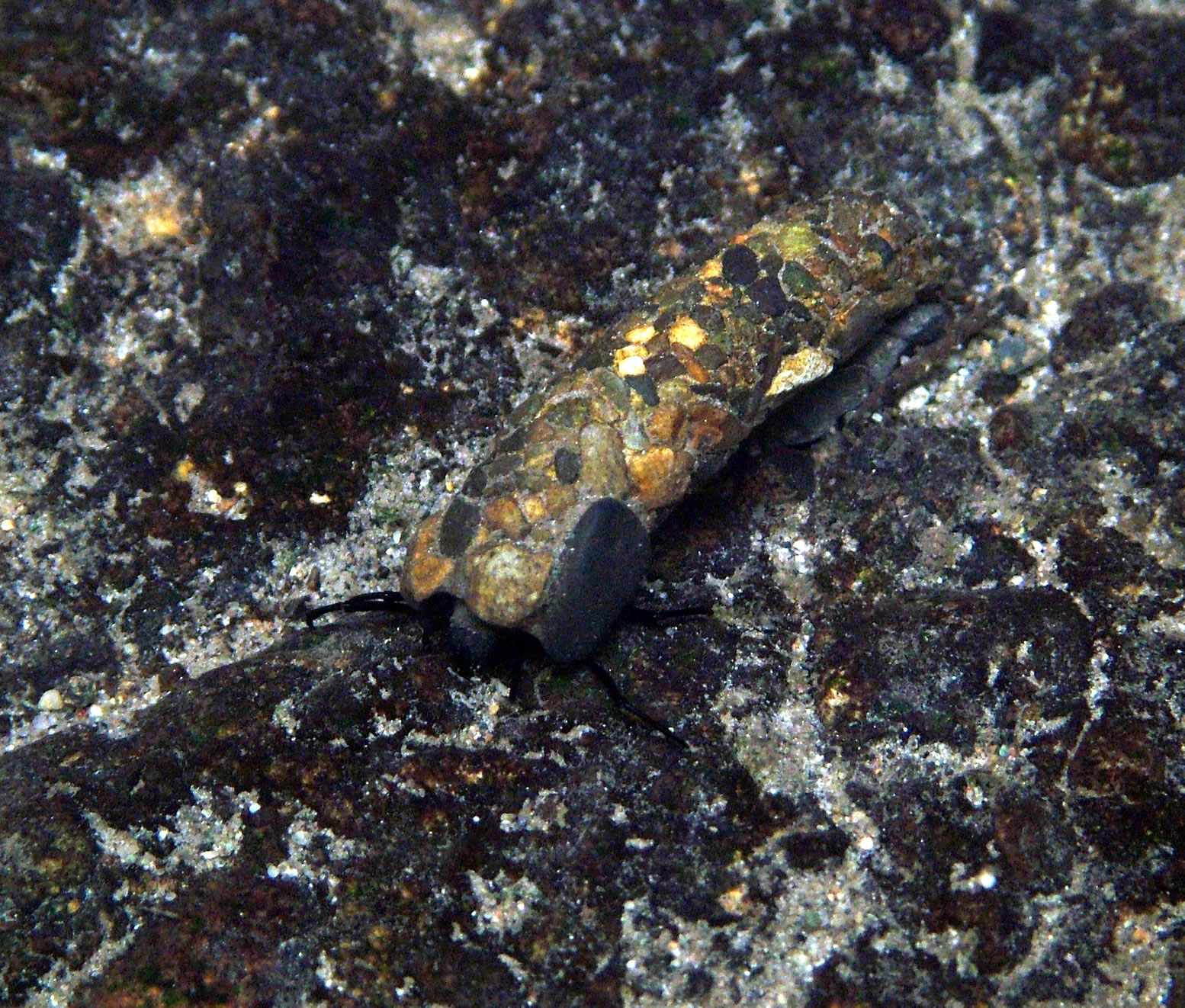
Caddisfly larva creates a portable tube decorated with local materials, here small pebbles, in which it lives.

In 1889, William Bateson observed in detail the way that decorator crabs fix materials on their backs. He noted that "[t]he whole proceeding is most human and purposeful", and that if a Stenorhynchus crab is cleaned, it will "immediately begin to clothe itself again with the same care and precision as before".

In his book The Colours of Animals (1890), Edward Bagnall Poulton classified protective animal coloration into types such as warning colours and protective mimicry. He included self decoration under the heading "Adventitious Protection", quoting Bateson's account of decorator crabs.

In his textbook Adaptive Coloration in Animals (1940), Hugh Bamford Cott describes self-decoration under the heading "adventitious concealing coloration", also naming it "adventitious resemblance". He describes it as a device "perhaps unrivalled" for effective concealment, and points out that it is brought about and depends on "highly specialized behaviour". Further, it grades into other means of protection including "the borrowing of protection from aposematic partners" and the use of "fortified hiding-places" and burrows. Cott compares the way Australian aborigines once used water lily leaves over their faces to swim towards waterfowl until they were close enough to catch them by the legs.

== In animals ==
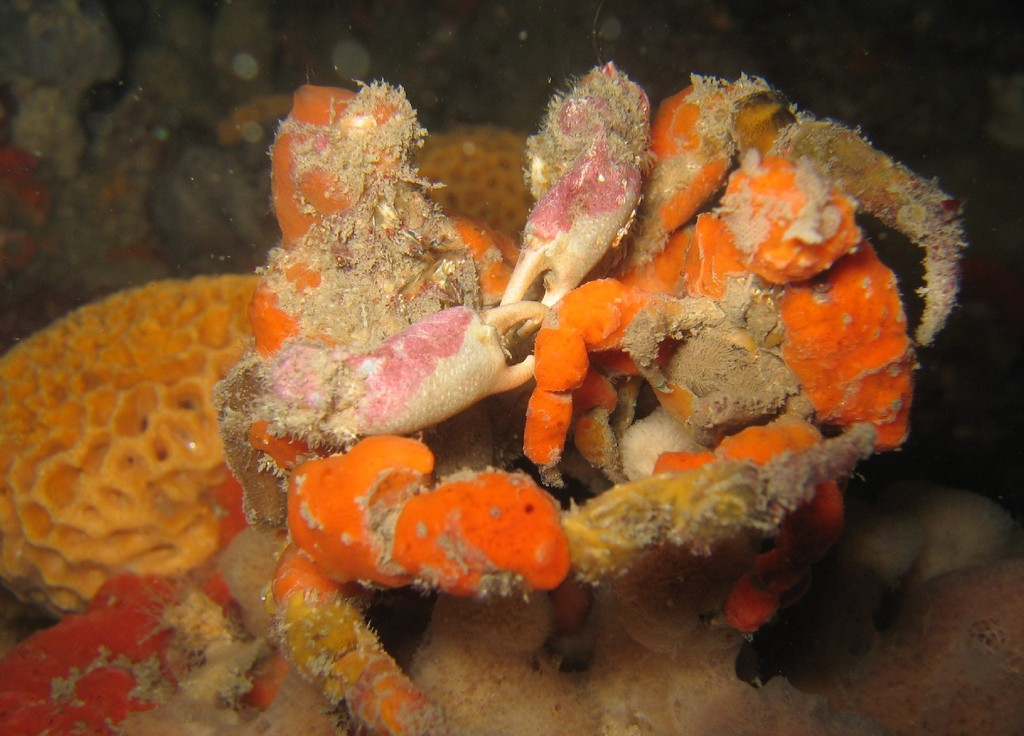
Sponge decorator crabs, Hyastenus elatus

A variety of animals, both predators and prey, make use of self-decoration to conceal themselves.

=== Antipredator adaptations ===
Decorator crabs of many species camouflage themselves with pieces of seaweed, shells, small stones, and living organisms such as hydrozoa, sponges, and sea anemones to evade predators. They pick up these pieces and stick them to their shells as semi-permanent camouflage, keeping them until they next moult. Their shells are covered with curved hairs to hold the decorations. The relationship with some of these animals, such as sea anemones is mutualistic; in the case of aposematic animals like stinging sea anemones, the crabs are making use of the warning coloration of these partners to ward off predators.

Self-decoration is seen in some insects such as caddis fly larvae, the nymphs of the masked hunter bug, and occasionally also in octopuses.

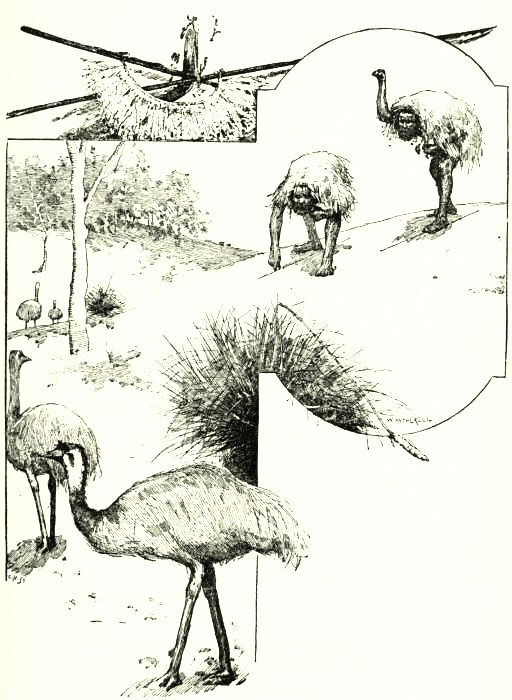
Engraving 'Emu Hunting in Australia' by Maturin M. Ballou, 1889

=== Aggressive mimicry ===
Chrysopidae lacewing larvae decorate themselves with a mixture of materials including moulted cuticle and their own droppings, which appears to serve both to camouflage the larvae and to repel predators. Larvae of species that eat aphids decorate themselves with the waxy material produced by the aphids; larvae decorated like this are ignored by ants which farm the aphids, whereas the ants eject undecorated larvae, making this a wolf in sheep's clothing strategy of aggressive mimicry. Some owlfly larvae, which are ambush predators, similarly self-decorate, hiding until prey comes within range.

The strategy has been used by traditional human hunters, such as when Australian aborigines dressed in emu skins and adopted emu-like postures to hunt these birds.

== In military usage ==
Snipers, working alone, rely heavily on effective camouflage. This is often provided by a ghillie suit, a whole-body covering fitted with many loops into which the wearer can insert grass or other plant materials to match the local environment, or are made with cloth simulating tufts of leaves. Such good camouflage comes at the price of the weight of the ghillie suit and the attached materials; the suit is hot and uncomfortable to wear in hot weather, and it restricts mobility.

The ghillie suit was developed by Scottish gamekeepers for hunting deer, and adapted initially by a Scottish Highland regiment, the Lovat Scouts, for military use. In 1916, the Lovat Scouts became the British Army's first sniper unit. Snipers of many armies have since then adopted the ghillie suit for the effective concealment that it affords.

Cott used the example of the larva of the blotched emerald moth, which fixes a screen of fragments of leaves to its specially hooked bristles, to argue that military camouflage had used the same method, pointing out that the "device is ... essentially the same as one widely practised during the Great War for the concealment, not of caterpillars, but of caterpillar-tractors, [gun] battery positions, observation posts and so forth."

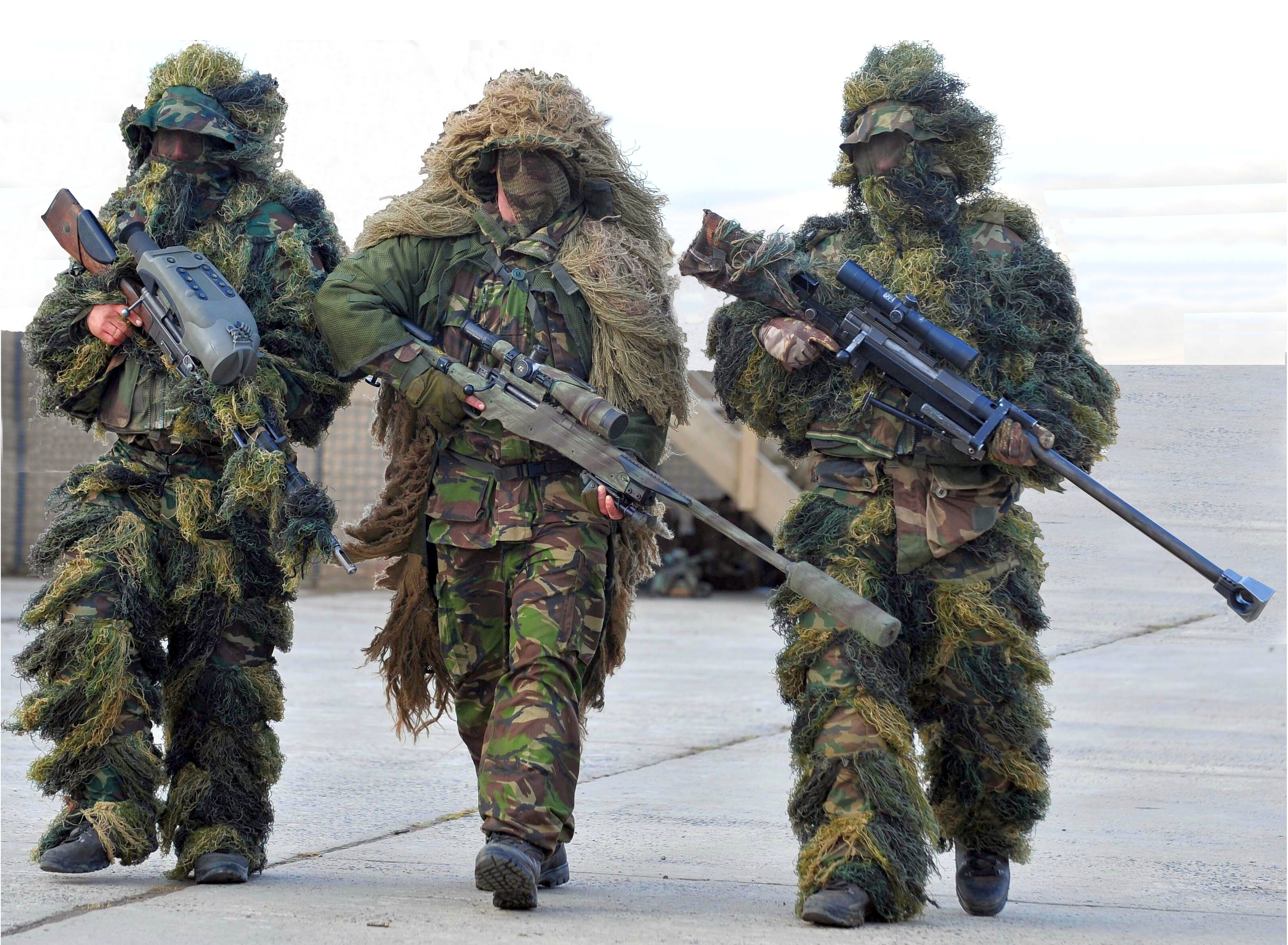
British and French snipers in ghillie suits

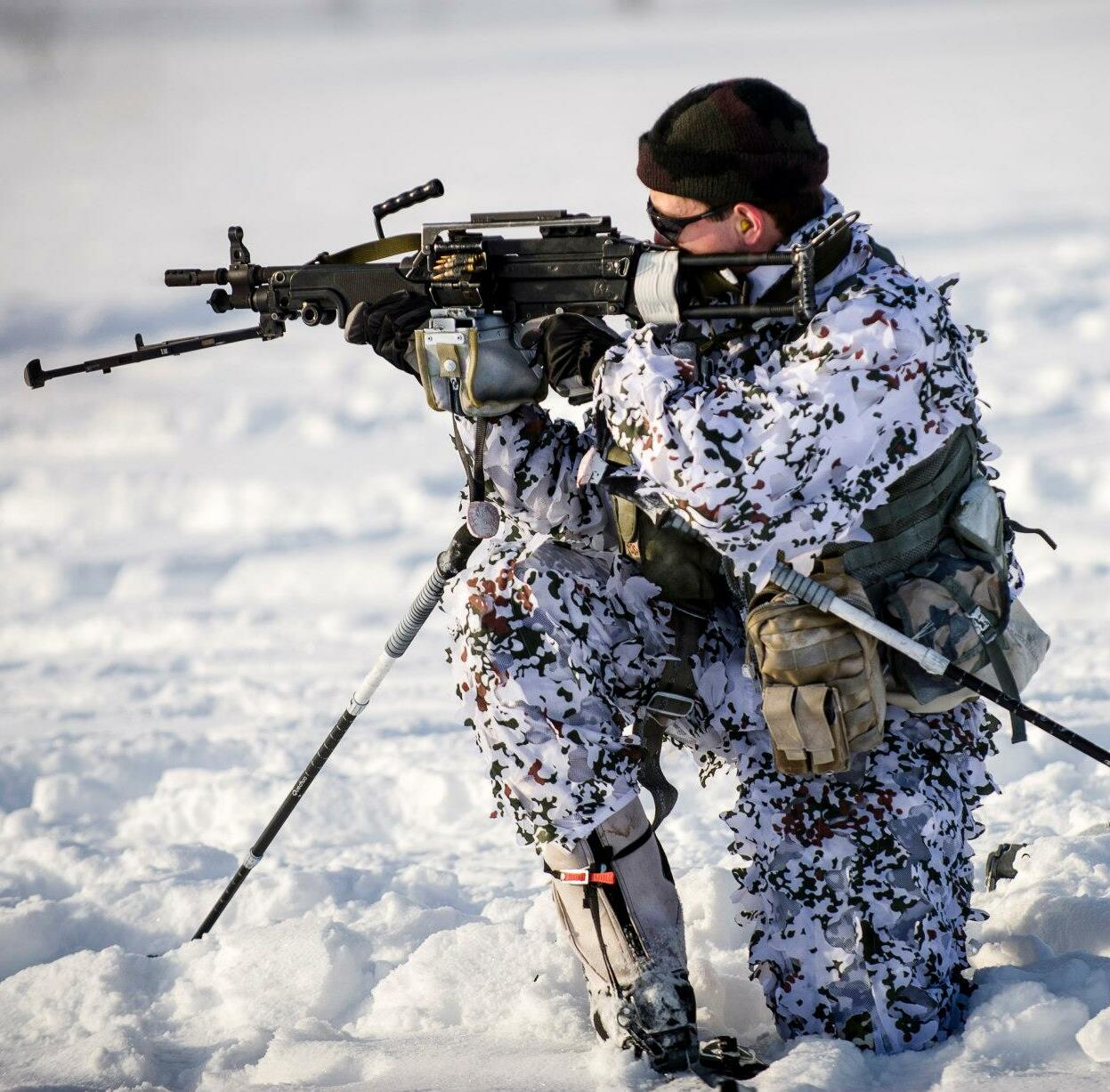
Swedish paratrooper on skis with a winter ghillie suit
