= Hydroides ezoensis =

Scientific classification
- Domain: Eukaryota
- Kingdom: Animalia
- Phylum: Annelida
- Clade: Pleistoannelida
- Clade: Sedentaria
- Order: Sabellida
- Family: Serpulidae
- Genus: Hydroides
- Species: H. ezoensis

Binomial name
- Hydroides ezoensis Okuda, 1934

Species of annelid worm

Hydroides ezoensis is a species of tube-forming annelid worm in the family Serpulidae. It is native to the temperate northern Pacific and the central Indo-Pacific and is found in the intertidal zone and on submerged rocks, shells, pilings, jetties and boats.

== Description ==
Hydroides ezoensis secretes a robust, white, calcareous tube that may be 20 mm (0.8 in) long after a year, with a diameter of about 3 mm (0.1 in); this starts off flattened against the surface, but later grows upwards. Various particles may get incorporated into the tube, and the older parts may be greenish from the growth of algae. From the tube, the crown of radioles projects, consisting of two semi-circular whorls, each of up to 26 branched tentacles. These are purplish, banded with white, orange, tan or brown. The first dorsal pair of tentacles is unbranched and is modified to form a pseudoperculum, which can be used to close the tube after the worm has retracted inside.

== Distribution and habitat ==
The species is native to the temperate northern Pacific and the central Indo-Pacific. It was first described in 1934 from the waters around Japan; the specific epithet refers to Ezo, the historic name for the island of Hokkaido. Since then it has appeared and become established in the waters around Great Britain, and in those around Australia. It occurs in estuaries and bays, on hard substrates including rocks, seaweed, shells, pilings, docks, jetties, buoys and boats. It is a common fouling organism of vessels, docks, industrial water intakes and aquaculture facilities, and sometimes grows on muddy gravel substrates.

== Ecology ==
The calcareous tube secreted by the worm is a refuge into which it can retreat; these tubes sometimes form large aggregations. Like all serpulids, H. ezoensis is a filter feeder, extending its crown of tentacles into the water column to catch plankton and organic particles floating past. Two species of parasitic copepod are associated with this worm, and the dense mass of tubes provides suitable habitat for protozoans, poriferans, bryozoans, other polychaete worms and amphipods.

The sexes are separate in this species, and gametes are released into the sea where fertilisation occurs. The worms coordinate their reproductive processes by the production of pheromones which indicate their readiness to breed. The larvae are planktonic and are induced to settle and undergo metamorphosis by chemical cues released by the bacterial biofilm on the substrate. A rock on which tubeworms of this species already live is a more attractive place to settle than a new, clean surface.
