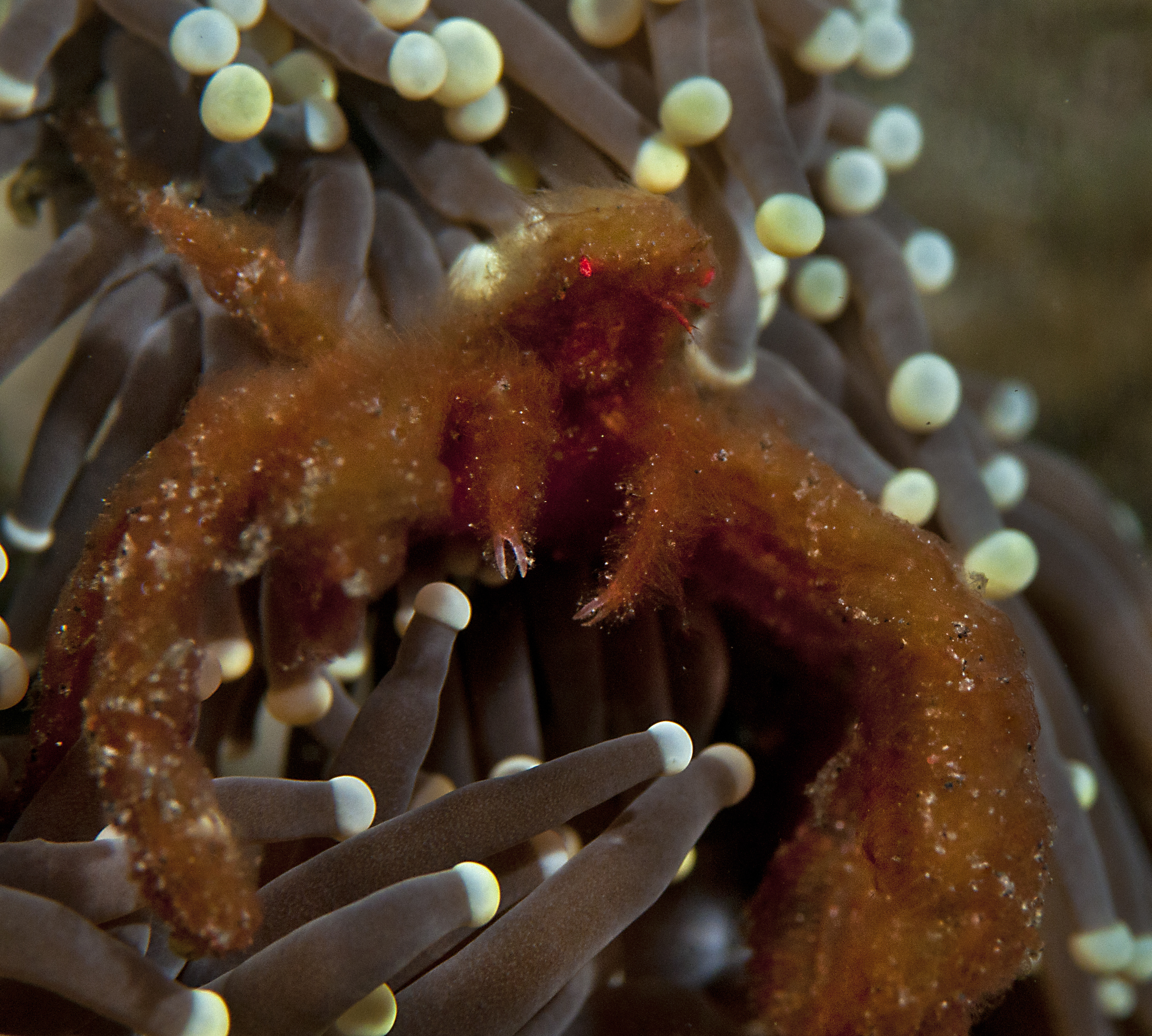
- Achaeus japonicus

Scientific classification
- Kingdom: Animalia
- Phylum: Arthropoda
- Class: Malacostraca
- Order: Decapoda
- Suborder: Pleocyemata
- Infraorder: Brachyura
- Family: Inachidae
- Genus: Achaeus; Leach, 1817

= Achaeus (crab) =

Genus of crabs

Achaeus is a genus of crabs comprising the following species:

- Achaeus affinis Miers, 1884
- Achaeus akanensis Sakai, 1937
- Achaeus anauchen Buitendijk, 1939
- Achaeus barnardi Griffin, 1968
- Achaeus boninensis Miyake & Takeda, 1969
- Achaeus brevidactylus Sakai, 1938
- Achaeus brevifalcatus Rathbun, 1911
- Achaeus brevirostris (Haswell, 1879)
- Achaeus brevis (Ortmann, 1894)
- Achaeus buderes Manning & Holthuis, 1981
- Achaeus cadelli Alcock, 1896
- Achaeus cranchii Leach, 1817
- Achaeus curvirostris (A. Milne-Edwards, 1873)
- Achaeus dubia Laurie, 1906
- Achaeus erythraeus Balss, 1929
- Achaeus foresti Monod, 1956
- Achaeus gracilis (Costa, 1839)
- Achaeus inimicus Rathbun, 1911
- Achaeus japonicus (De Haan, 1839)
- Achaeus kermadecensis Webber & Takeda, 2005
- Achaeus lacertosus Stimpson, 1858
- Achaeus laevioculis Miers, 1884
- Achaeus lorina (Adams & White, 1848)
- Achaeus monodi (Capart, 1951)
- Achaeus paradicei Griffin, 1970
- Achaeus podocheloides Griffin, 1970
- Achaeus powelli Manning, 1982
- Achaeus pugnax (De Man, 1928)
- Achaeus robustus Yokoya, 1933
- Achaeus serenei Griffin & Tranter, 1986
- Achaeus spinosissimus Griffin, 1968
- Achaeus spinosus Miers, 1879
- Achaeus superciliaris (Ortmann, 1893)
- Achaeus trifalcatus Forest & Guinot, 1966
- Achaeus trituberculatus Rathbun, 1894
- Achaeus tuberculatus Miers, 1879
- Achaeus turbator Manning & Holthuis, 1981
- Achaeus varians Takeda & Miyake, 1969
- Achaeus villosus Rathbun, 1916
