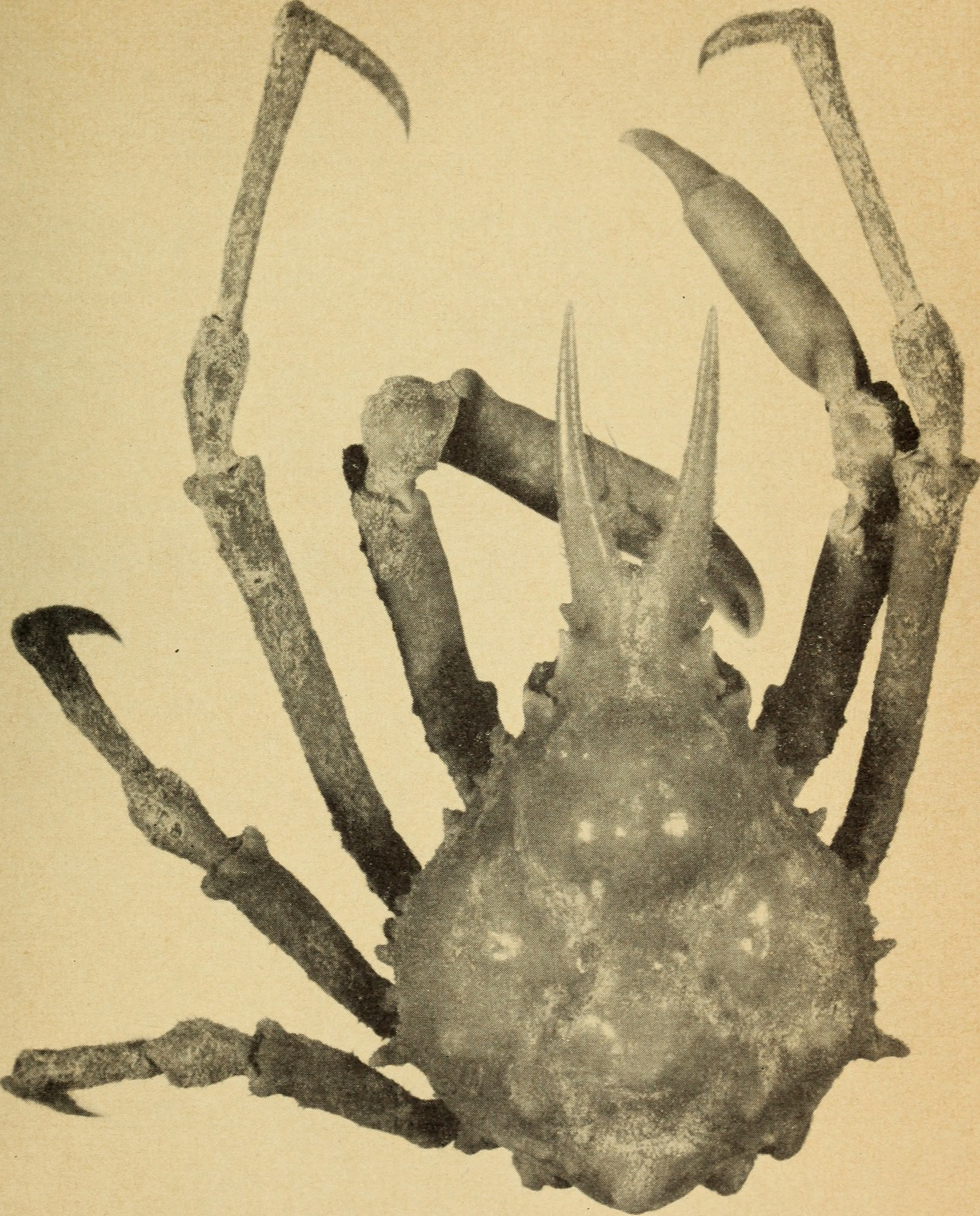

Scientific classification
- Domain: Eukaryota
- Kingdom: Animalia
- Phylum: Arthropoda
- Class: Malacostraca
- Order: Decapoda
- Suborder: Pleocyemata
- Infraorder: Brachyura
- Family: Epialtidae
- Genus: Hyastenus
- Species: H. hilgendorfi

Binomial name
- Hyastenus hilgendorfi de Man, 1887

= Hyastenus hilgendorfi =

Species of crab

Hyastenus hilgendorfi is a species of spider crab from the family Epialtidae, classified in the sub-family Pisinae, from the Indo-Pacific region. It has been recorded in the Suez Canal and there have been a few records in the eastern Mediterranean, making it a Lessepsian migrant.

== Description ==
Hyastenus hilgendorfi has a roughly pear-shaped carapace which is convex and bearing small tubercles and a downy coat, there is a small epibranchial plug. There are prominent projections on the gastric region, heart and gut. A pair of post-gastric tubercles are close to the orbits. Six mesobranchial tubercles are sub-equal to the sides of the midline. There are two divergent rostral spines, which have a length of two-thirds of the carapace in males but are much smaller in females. The retractable eyestalks are small. The chelipeds are the same length as the carapace, the merus has nodules in its proximal portion while the claw is smooth and glabrous. The merus of the pereopods also bear nodules, while the posterior border of the dactyl is spiny, the spines becoming successively larger distally. The separation of the rostral spines is u shaped or keyhole shaped. H. holgendorfi is a brownish colour.

== Distribution ==
Hyastenus hilgendorfi occurs from the Red Sea through the Indian Ocean to the western Pacific to Hawaii and south to Australia. It is reported to occur throughout the Suez Canal and the first record in the Mediterranean was recorded off Israel in 1960. The second record was in 1977 and the third in 2004, which may mean there is a small population in the south eastern Mediterranean.

== Biology ==
Hyastenus hilgendorfi is found on seabeds of coarse sand, debris and gravel, between 2 and 93 metres in depth. It is a "decorator crab" which uses other organisms to cover its body and in a study in the Suez Canal the barnacle Amphibalanus amphitrite, the tunicate Microcosmus sp., and the tube worm Hydroides elegans were found to be the most frequent epibionts. and up to 49 species of epibionts have been recognised for this species in the Suez Canal. The purpose of the decoration in this species seems is to camouflage the crab and disguise its shape.
