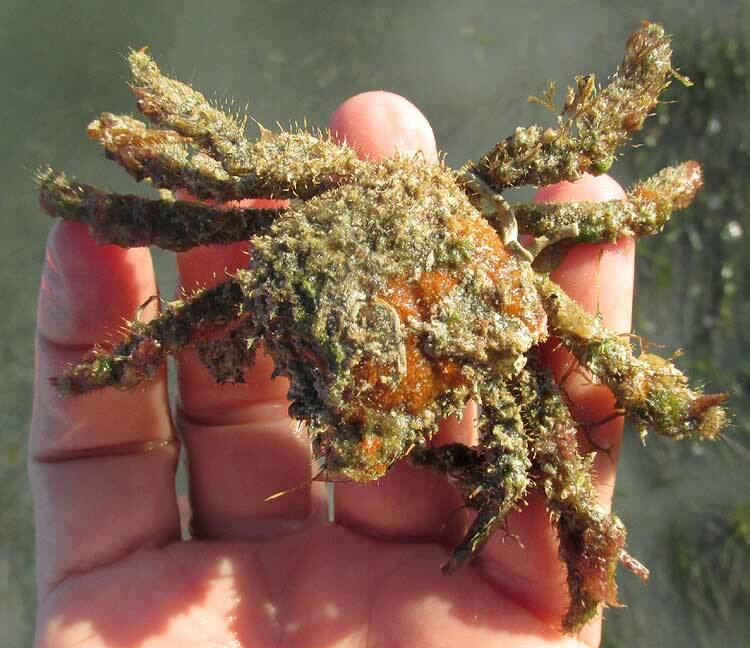
- Amphithrax aculeatus

Scientific classification
- Kingdom: Animalia
- Phylum: Arthropoda
- Class: Malacostraca
- Order: Decapoda
- Suborder: Pleocyemata
- Infraorder: Brachyura
- Family: Mithracidae
- Genus: Amphithrax; Windsor & Felder, 2017

= Amphithrax =

Genus of arthropods

Amphithrax is a genus of saltwater crabs belonging to a group (superfamily Majoidea), often known as spider crabs or decorator crabs.

== Description ==
On the iNaturalist page comparing pictures of the various Amphithrax species it is seen that they all share these features:

- spoon-shaped claw tips
- legs armed with tubercles and sometimes hairlike or sharp projections
- the fronts of their carapaces bear various pointed projections, sometimes with those around the eyes particularly developed

== Habitat ==
Amphithrax species occur among coral rocks and rubble, beneath sea anemones and in rock crevices in intertidal zones to subtidal zones of up to 60 meters depth (~200 feet).

== Range ==
The map registering observations of Amphithrax species at iNaturalist documents the genus's presence in tropical and subtropical waters of the Americas. Amphithra armatus has been recorded in the western Pacific, in Taiwanese waters, as an invasive species.

== List of species ==
In 2025, these are the accepted species of the genus Amphithrax:

- Amphithrax aculeatus (Herbst, 1790)
- Amphithrax armatus (de Saussure, 1853)
- Amphithrax bellii (Gerstaecker, 1856)
- Amphithrax besnardi (Melo, 1990)
- Amphithrax braziliensis (Rathbun, 1892)
- Amphithrax caboverdianus (Türkay, 1986)
- Amphithrax clarionensis (Garth, 1940)
- Amphithrax hemphilli (Rathbun, 1892)
- Amphithrax pilosus (Rathbun, 1892)
- Amphithrax tuberculatus (Stimpson, 1860)
- Amphithrax verrucosus (H. Milne Edwards, 1832)
