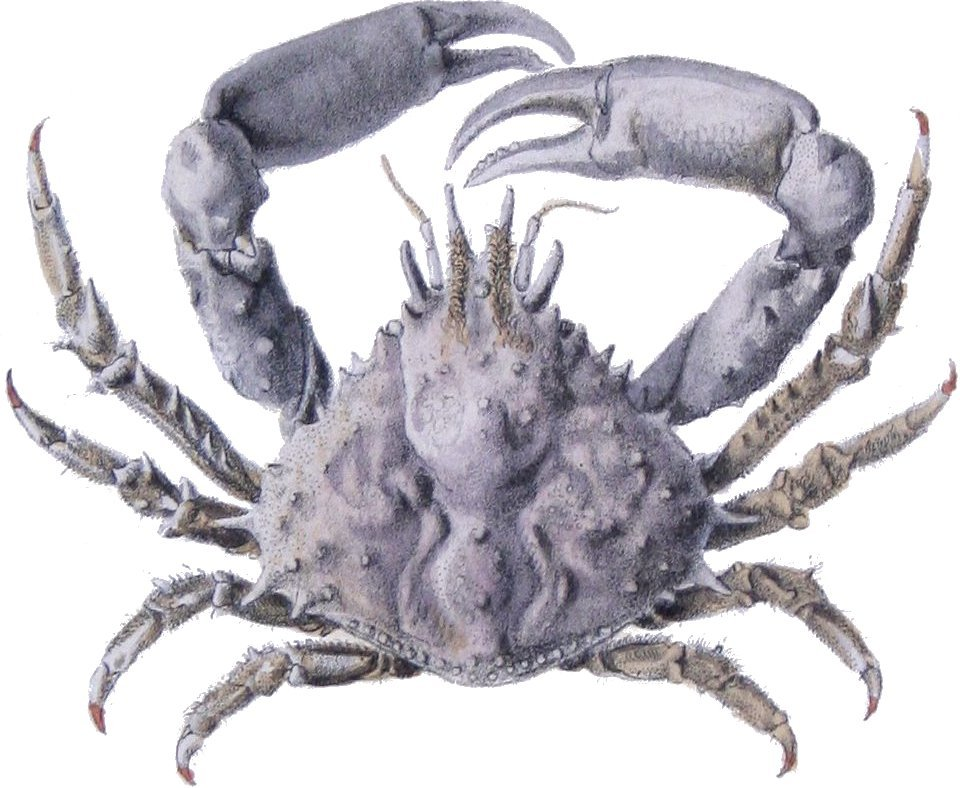
- Microphrys weddelli

Scientific classification
- Kingdom: Animalia
- Phylum: Arthropoda
- Clade: Pancrustacea
- Class: Malacostraca
- Order: Decapoda
- Suborder: Pleocyemata
- Infraorder: Brachyura
- Family: Majidae
- Genus: Microphrys; H. Milne-Edwards, 1851

= Microphrys =

Genus of crabs

Microphrys is a genus of crab in the family Majidae, containing the following species:.

- Microphrys aculeatus (Bell, 1835)
- Microphrys antillensis Rathbun, 1901
- Microphrys bicornutus (Latreille, 1825)
- Microphrys branchialis Rathbun, 1898
- Microphrys garthi (Lemos de Castro, 1953)
- Microphrys interruptus Rathbun, 1920
- Microphrys platysoma (Stimpson, 1860)
- Microphrys triangulatus (Lockington, 1877)
- Microphrys weddelli H. Milne-Edwards, 1851
