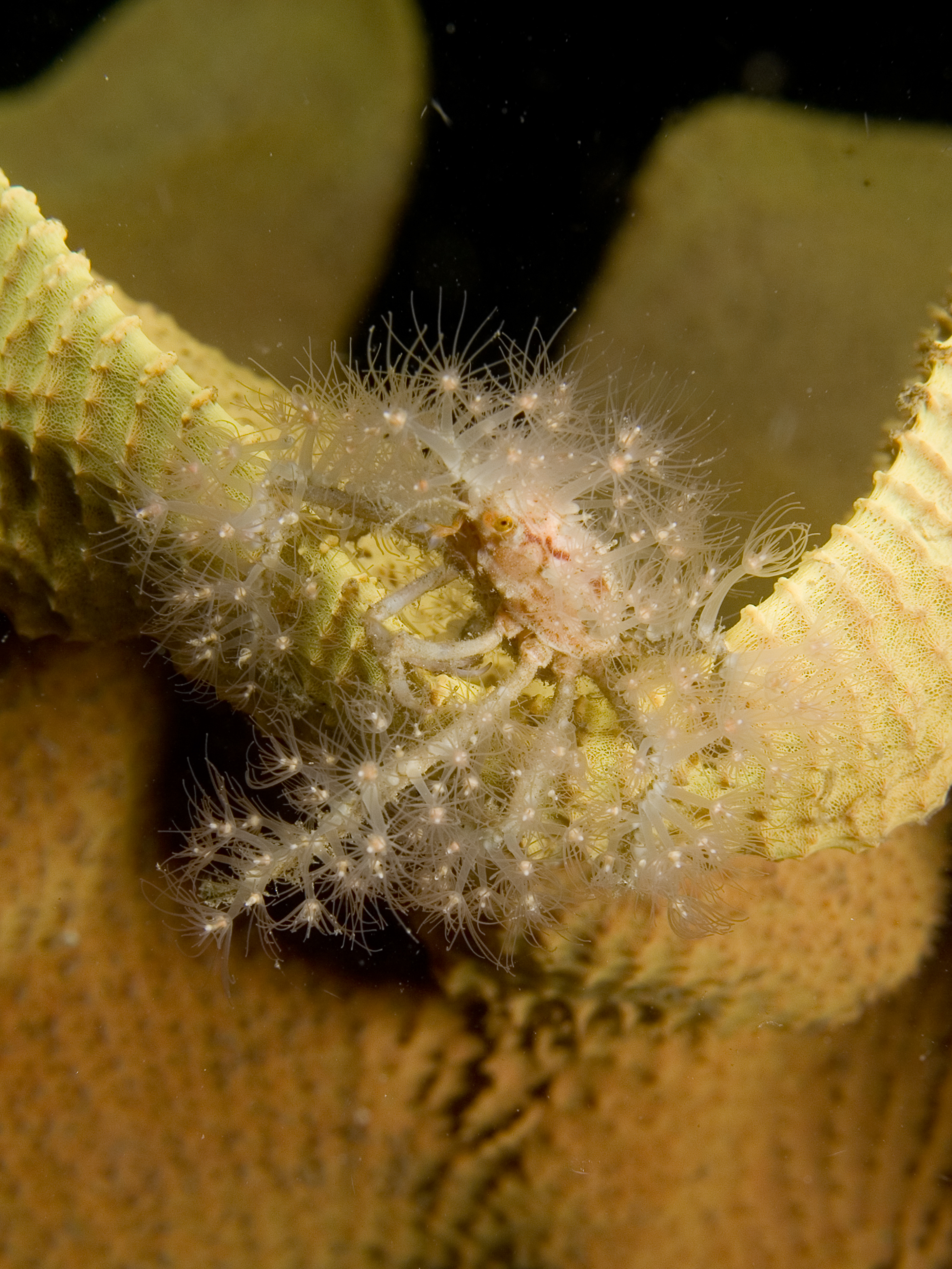
- Decorator crab (Achaeus spinosus) covered in hydropolypes on Ianthella basta (elephant ear sponge). This crab is using hydropolypes to cover its shell in order to provide protection from predators. The crab benefits from the hydropolype's sting while the hydropolypes benefit from the crab's mobility allowing it to feed in a larger area.

Scientific classification
- Kingdom: Animalia
- Phylum: Arthropoda
- Clade: Pancrustacea
- Class: Malacostraca
- Order: Decapoda
- Suborder: Pleocyemata
- Infraorder: Brachyura
- Family: Inachidae
- Genus: Achaeus
- Species: A. spinosus

Binomial name
- Achaeus spinosus Miers, 1879

= Achaeus spinosus =

Species of crab

Achaeus spinosus is a small decapod which belongs to the large family of the Inachidae or the spider crabs.

== Description ==
The Achaeus spinosus carapace has an oval shape and does not exceed 4 centimetres or 1.6 inches in length. This crab possesses long fine clawless legs, except the front pair which is smaller and bears chelae (pincers). The pedunculate eyes are red. The whole whitish body is thickly covered with fine hairs which help to fix some pieces of sponge or fixed hydroids for camouflage.

== Distribution and ecology ==
Achaeus spinosus can be observed in the tropical waters of the Indo-west Pacific area, including the Red Sea. Achaeus spinosus usually lives in association with some species of soft coral or sponge.

Achaeus spinosus feeds on plankton and suspended particles which it catches by climbing on the host with whom it's in association to expose itself to the current. Achaeus spinosus is often observed on its living support. This crab is mainly active at night.
