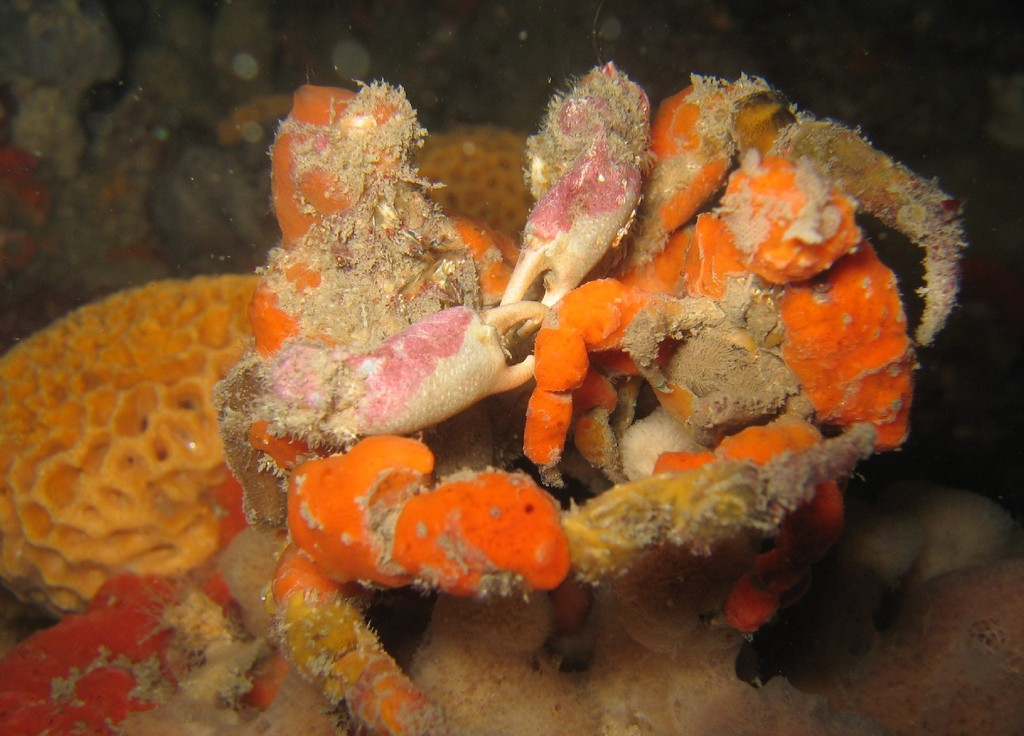

Scientific classification
- Kingdom: Animalia
- Phylum: Arthropoda
- Clade: Pancrustacea
- Class: Malacostraca
- Order: Decapoda
- Suborder: Pleocyemata
- Infraorder: Brachyura
- Family: Epialtidae
- Genus: Hyastenus
- Species: H. elatus

Binomial name
- Hyastenus elatus Griffin & Tranter, 1986

= Hyastenus elatus =

Species of crab

Hyastenus elatus is a species of crab in the family Epialtidae. It is one of several decorator crabs, habitually covering itself in aposematic sponges which may also serve as camouflage.
