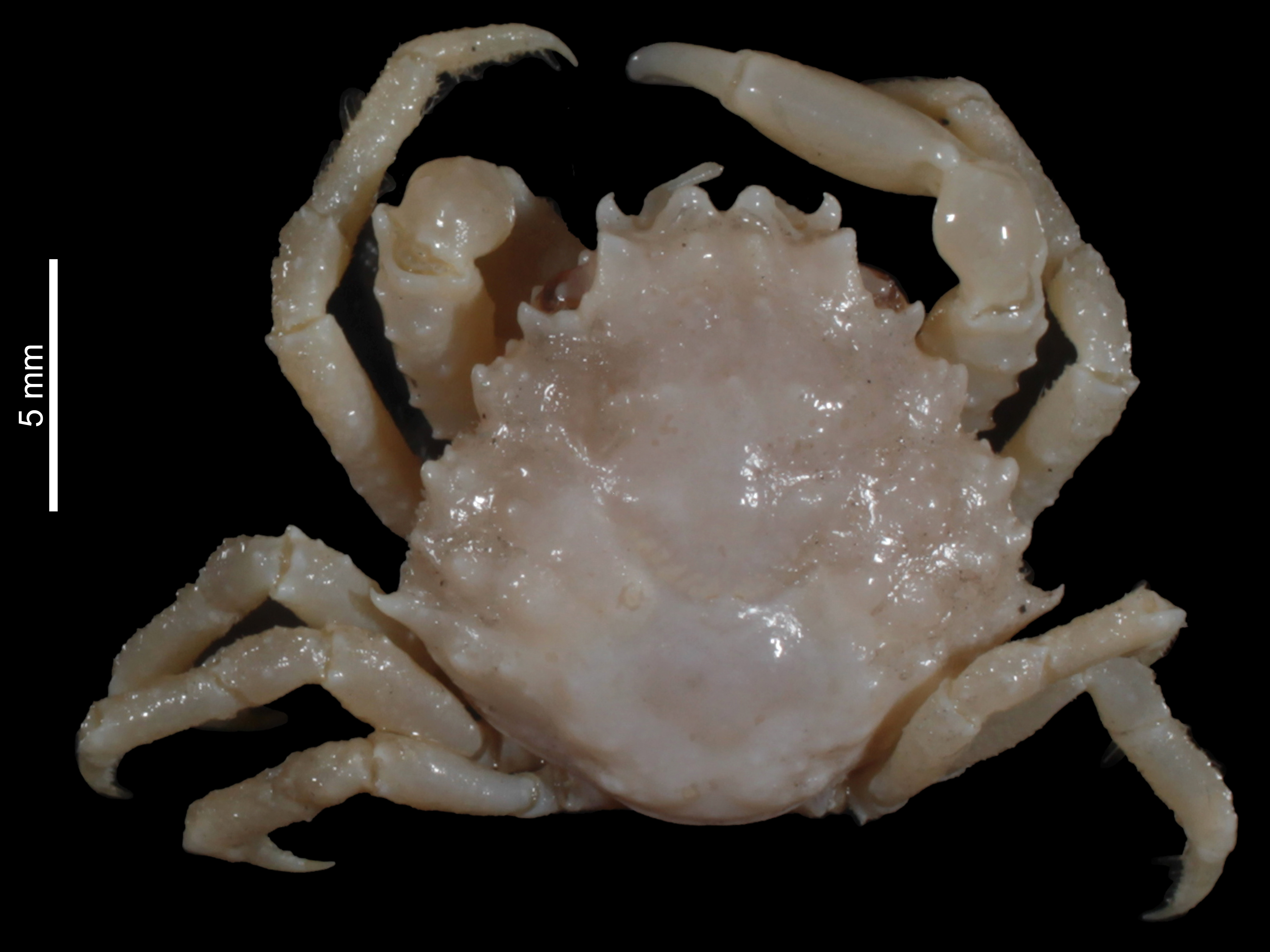
- Mithrax hispidus

Scientific classification
- Kingdom: Animalia
- Phylum: Arthropoda
- Clade: Pancrustacea
- Class: Malacostraca
- Order: Decapoda
- Suborder: Pleocyemata
- Infraorder: Brachyura
- Superfamily: Majoidea
- Family: Mithracidae; MacLeay, 1838

= Mithracidae =

Family of crustaceans

Mithracidae is a family of crustaceans belonging to the order Decapoda.

== Genera ==
Genera:

- Ala Lockington, 1877
- Amphithrax Windsor & Felder, 2017
- †Disspinamithrax Feldmann, Schweitzer & Casadío, 2023
- Hemus A. Milne-Edwards, 1875
- Maguimithrax Klompmaker, Portell, Klier, Prueter & Tucker, 2015
- Microphrys H. Milne Edwards, 1851
- Mithraculus White, 1847
- Mithrax Latreille, 1816
- Nemausa A. Milne-Edwards, 1875
- Nonala Windsor & Felder, 2014
- Omalacantha Streets, 1871
- Petramithrax Windsor & Felder, 2014
- Pitho Bell, 1836
- Teleophrys Stimpson, 1860
- Thoe Bell, 1836
