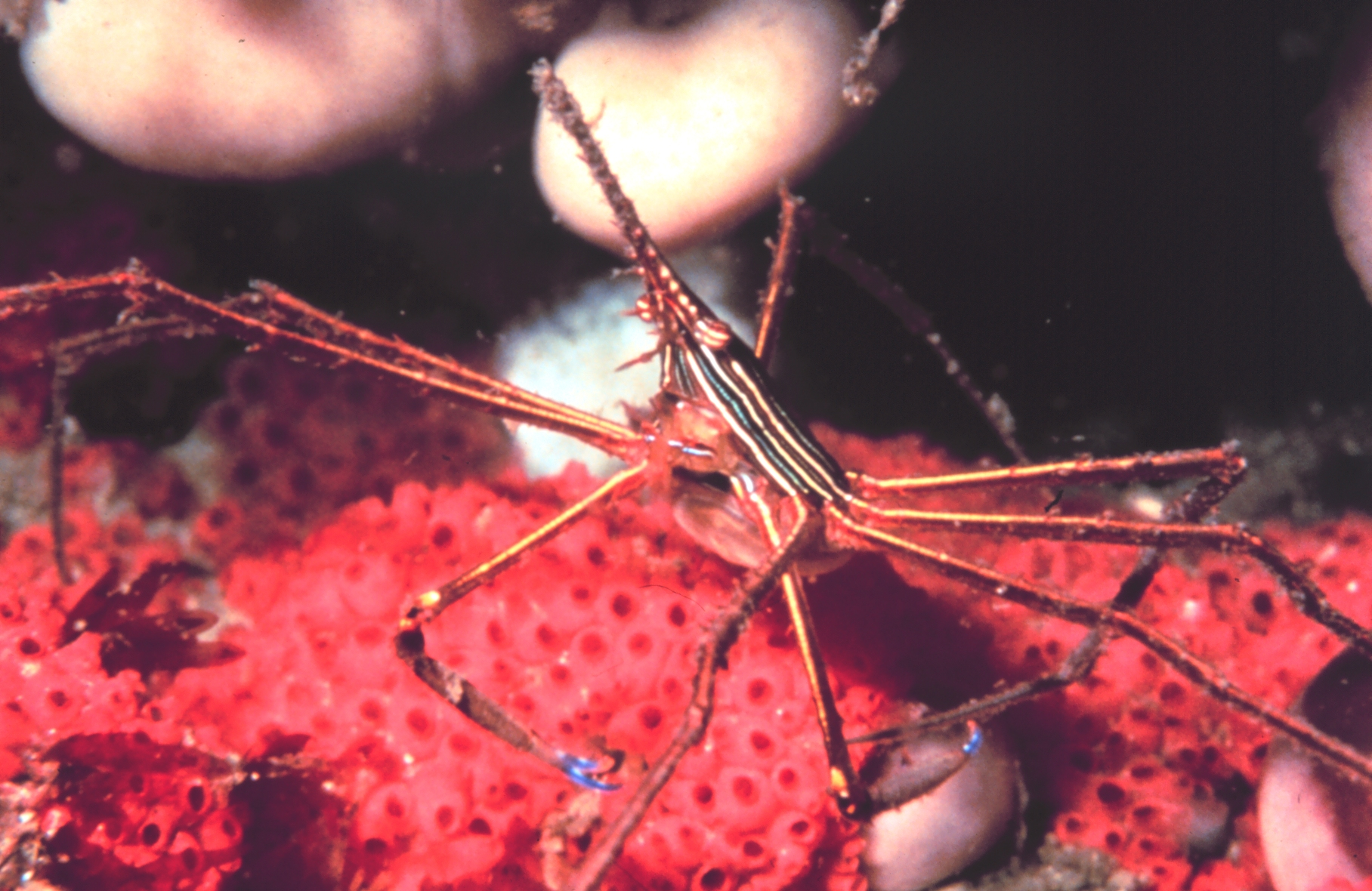
- Stenorhynchus seticornis

Scientific classification
- Kingdom: Animalia
- Phylum: Arthropoda
- Clade: Pancrustacea
- Class: Malacostraca
- Order: Decapoda
- Suborder: Pleocyemata
- Infraorder: Brachyura
- Family: Inachidae
- Genus: Stenorhynchus; Lamarck, 1818

Synonyms
- Pactolus Leach, 1815 [suppressed]; Stenorynchus Lamarck, 1818 [orth. error]; Stenorrhynchus Berthold, 1827 [orth. error]; Tactolus Berthold, 1827 [orth. error]

= Stenorhynchus =

Genus of crabs

Stenorhynchus is a genus of marine crabs in the family Inachidae, containing the following species:

- Stenorhynchus debilis (S. I. Smith, 1871)
- Stenorhynchus lanceolatus (Brullé, 1837)
- †Stenorhynchus lethaeus (Smirnov, 1929)
- Stenorhynchus seticornis (J. F. W. Herbst, 1788) – yellowline arrow crab
- Stenorhynchus yangi Goeke, 1989 – red arrow crab
