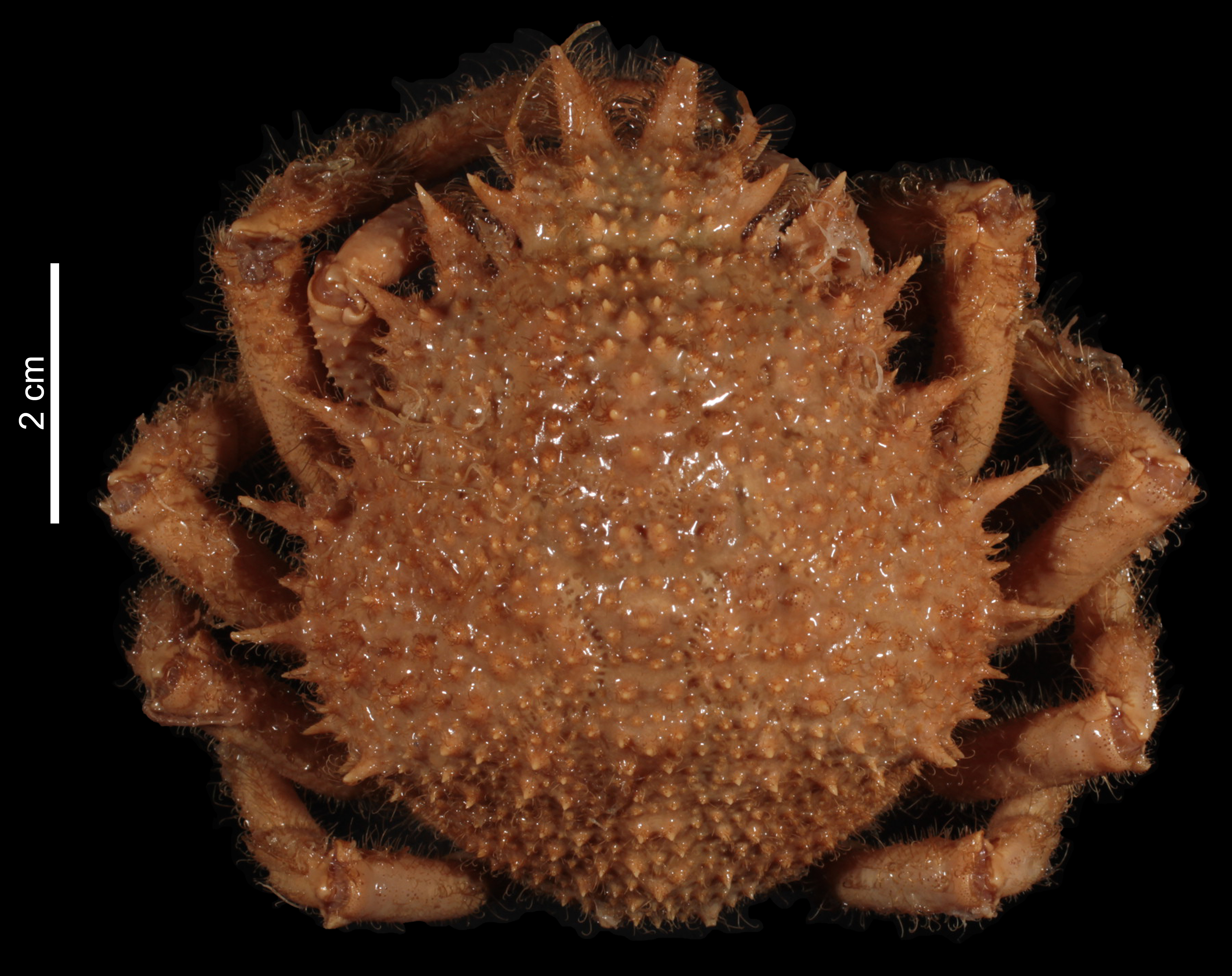

Scientific classification
- Kingdom: Animalia
- Phylum: Arthropoda
- Clade: Pancrustacea
- Class: Malacostraca
- Order: Decapoda
- Suborder: Pleocyemata
- Infraorder: Brachyura
- Family: Majidae
- Genus: Maja
- Species: M. brachydactyla

Binomial name
- Maja brachydactyla Balss, 1922

Synonyms
- Maïa gigantea Baudouin, 1931; Maja squinado var. brachydactyla Balss, 1922; Mamaia queketti Stebbing, 1908

= Maja brachydactyla =

Species of crab

Maja brachydactyla is a species of crab in the family Majidae. It was initially described as a subspecies of M. squinado. A review of the species complex published in 1998 was able to differentiate between specimens from the Mediterranean Sea and those from the Atlantic Ocean, and concluded that the Atlantic specimens were a separate species, accepted as M. brachydactyla Balss, 1922.
