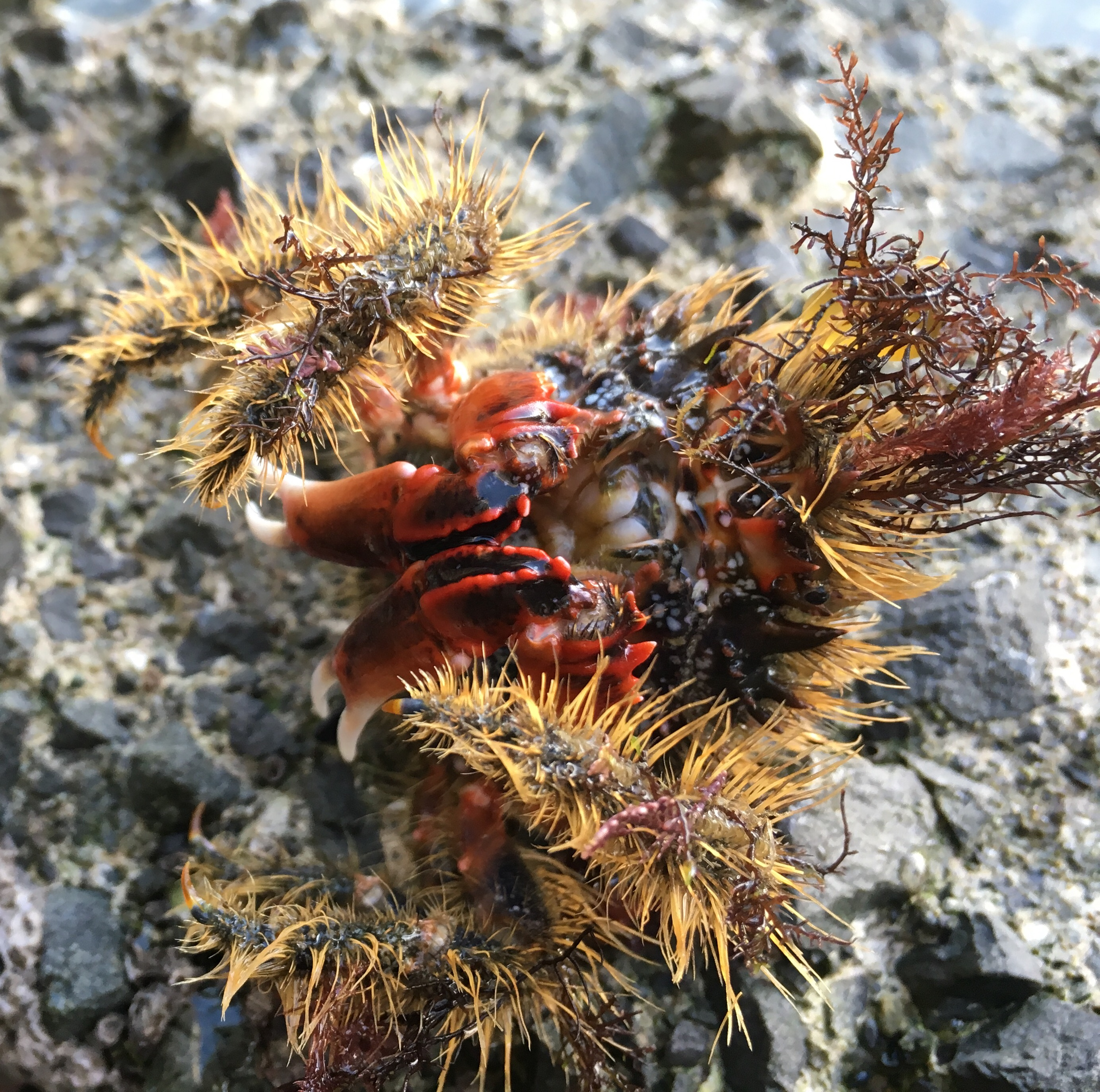

Scientific classification
- Kingdom: Animalia
- Phylum: Arthropoda
- Clade: Pancrustacea
- Class: Malacostraca
- Order: Decapoda
- Suborder: Pleocyemata
- Infraorder: Brachyura
- Family: Majidae
- Genus: Notomithrax
- Species: N. ursus

Binomial name
- Notomithrax ursus (Fabricius, 1787)

Synonyms
- Cancer ursus Fabricius, 1787; Cancer ursus Herbst, 1788; Paramithrax cristatus Filhol, 1885; Paramithrax Latreillei Miers, 1876

= Notomithrax ursus =

Species of crab

Notomithrax ursus, known as the hairy seaweed crab, is a spider crab of the family Majidae.

== Identification ==
=== Species description ===
This crustacean has a hard rounded-triangular shell, or carapace, that is covered in hair-like projections that vary in size. The shell's length is 1.3 times the size of its width, the shell's surface has many tubercles with spines running to the front of the shell going to the sides. The edges of the carapace have nine outward directed sharp spines: 3 supraorbital, 3 hepatic and 3 brachial. Two spines at the front of the crab's head form a V-shape and are covered with small bristles. Some of the bristles along the carapace are short and hooked while others are long and straight. The abdomen has seven segments in both sexes with the male abdomen being more narrow with the segments being broader than longer. The legs are longest in the front and get progressively shorter towards the back. It has three pairs of walking legs, a pair of swimming legs in the back, and a pair of claws at the front called chelipeds. The walking legs are long and slender with the back of the legs covered in a longitudinal row of short hooked bristles including long straight bristles. The pincers are orange or red with white tips, and the legs have brown hairs.

As a decorator crab, this crab attaches seaweed or algae from its environment to the hooked hairs on its body, which gives this crab camouflage along the ocean floor. Hairy seaweed crabs change their camouflage with 10-20% of the cover being replaced each day, this causes their movement to be very sluggish like many other spider crabs.

== Distribution and habitat ==
=== Natural global range ===
The seaweed crab is antipodean as it is native to New Zealand and south-east Australia.

=== New Zealand range ===
The seaweed crab is broadly dispersed across New Zealand shorelines on both the North and South Islands. It is also found on the Stewart and Chatham Islands.

=== Habitat preferences ===
The seaweed crab can be found along the coast amid rocks in tide pools and the intertidal zone. Its bathymetric range extends to 75 meters, meaning that it can be found in waters up to this depth, but it is mostly found in shallow waters. Crabs living in deeper waters usually do not show any masking behaviour. It is negatively phototactic, which means it moves away from light. For this reason, it often buries itself in the sand or hides among seaweed.

== Life cycle/Phenology ==
The female seaweed crab lays fertilized eggs from which larvae develop and break free. The eggs are bright orange when freshly laid and turn brown as they approach time to hatch, and are approximately 0.75mm across. There are multiple stages of the larva before they reach maturity including pre-zoea, zoea 1, zoea 2, and megalopa. When the larva hatches it is enclosed in a thin and transparent covering that is shed shortly after. Then this comes the first zoea stage during which the larva is about 3.0mm. Zoea 1 lasts 8–16 days before the exoskeleton of the larva is shed and it enters zoea 2. At zoea 2 the larva is about 3.5mm long. The larva transforms into megalopa after 12–15 days at a temperature of 16 degrees Celsius. After 20 days, the megalopa larva moults into a juvenile crab. They shed their shells every few months in order to grow, and will grow faster if they live in warmer water. Seaweed crabs typically grow to 5 cm across and live for approximately two years.

== Diet and foraging ==
=== Diet ===
Crabs are typically scavengers, meaning that they eat whatever they can find, and as omnivores this includes both plants and other animals. In a study conducted on seaweed crabs living on the coast of the South Island of New Zealand, the foreguts were opened among a sample of crabs to determine what foods had been consumed. Algae, including calcareous red algae and branched brown algae, was identified as the most commonly eaten substance, as it was found in nearly all of the crabs sampled. Other common foods included isopods, amphipods, and decapods (e.g. small fish, crayfish, other crabs). Bivalves, sponges, bryozoans, and more were consumed as well but not commonly. Meat consumed is usually from dead animals because seaweed crabs are slow moving and not very strong.

The guts of female crabs contained more brown non-branched algae and unknown substances than male crabs, although there was no apparent difference in the amount or variation of food consumed. Types of food consumed also varied by the size of the crab. Smaller male crabs ate more gastropods, isopods, and amphipods, while larger males ate more algae and decapods. Similarly, smaller female crabs ate more isopods and larger females ate more algae. These differences are likely due to the impact of size on the crab's ability to process foods. Both soft-bodied and hard-bodied animals were consumed, as well as a wide range of algae. Seaweed crabs use their claws to tear apart their food, and predation techniques vary based on the mobility of the prey. Larger mature crabs have a greater ability to process foods because they have more powerful claws and larger mouths.

There is also evidence that the species of algae that the seaweed crab attaches to its body are preferred species for consumption as well, so the masking behavior of these crabs serves as food storage. The crab can eat up to 4.1% of the algae masking them when there is no food available to consume. The types of algae for masking may also be chosen based on “calorific value or content of vitamins, nitrogen, or specific nutrients such as sugars and amino acids”.

=== Foraging ===
N. ursus uses its chelipeds to execute a wide variety of feeding techniques that it uses on those different types of prey. They can be used to pull off chitons and limpets from rocks, or open bivalves and gastropods. Small arthropods, juvenile crayfish and polychaetes were obtained by probing around with opened chalae and quickly closing them when they contacted the prey. Chelipeds are also used to tear prey into smaller pieces. E.g. brittlestar is rotated using the chelipeds to tear of the arm. Also, ‘gravel-scrubbing’ is used to feed on detritus and micro-organisms. For this feeding technique, N. ursus uses a cheliped to pick up pieces of gravel and move them along the inner mouthpart, thereby taking particles from the gravel.

== Predation ==
Seaweed crabs require camouflage because they are unable to defend themselves from other sea animals, such as sea otters, sea turtles, lobsters, rock crabs, and octopuses. Other fish may eat smaller crabs as well if they have strong enough jaws. Studies have shown a significant decrease in the predation experienced by decorated seaweed crabs compared to ones that had been cleaned. These crabs may also avoid predators more because they are nocturnal. Sometimes seaweed crabs will hide themselves amongst sponges that may serve as a level of protection because of the neurotoxins they have.

== Other information ==
A study conducted by Chris Woods in 1995 examined the foregut morphology of seaweed crabs, shedding light on the digestive system of the understudied spider crab. Brachyura have the most highly developed gut systems of decapod crustaceans. Seaweed crabs have adapted to a macrophagous diet, in other words eating large foods. They have teeth to break down the material they consume and setae, hair-like structures, to aid in the process. Cuspidate setae help to hold the food as it is torn apart to be ground into smaller pieces. Serrate setae serve as chemoreceptors or filters to separate out particles during digestion so that digested liquid is more easily absorbed. Plumodenticulate setae also help to filter and move particles along, but could serve to close gaps to keep out unwanted particles. Pappose setae might perform a range of functions such as chemoreceptors, mechanoreceptors, gap sealants, or scrapers.

As mentioned in the diet section, decorating behavior of seaweed crabs is thought to be a method of food storage in addition to camouflage. A study conducted by Woods and McLay (1994) explores this decorating behavior more in depth. Their study revealed that these crabs consume their camouflage materials most often when food is scarce but that it is still important as a food store during other times because they eat it even when other food sources are present. Feeding on their decorative algae also occurs mostly at night and is taken from their bodies rather than their legs. Both behaviors contribute to the maintenance of camouflage.
