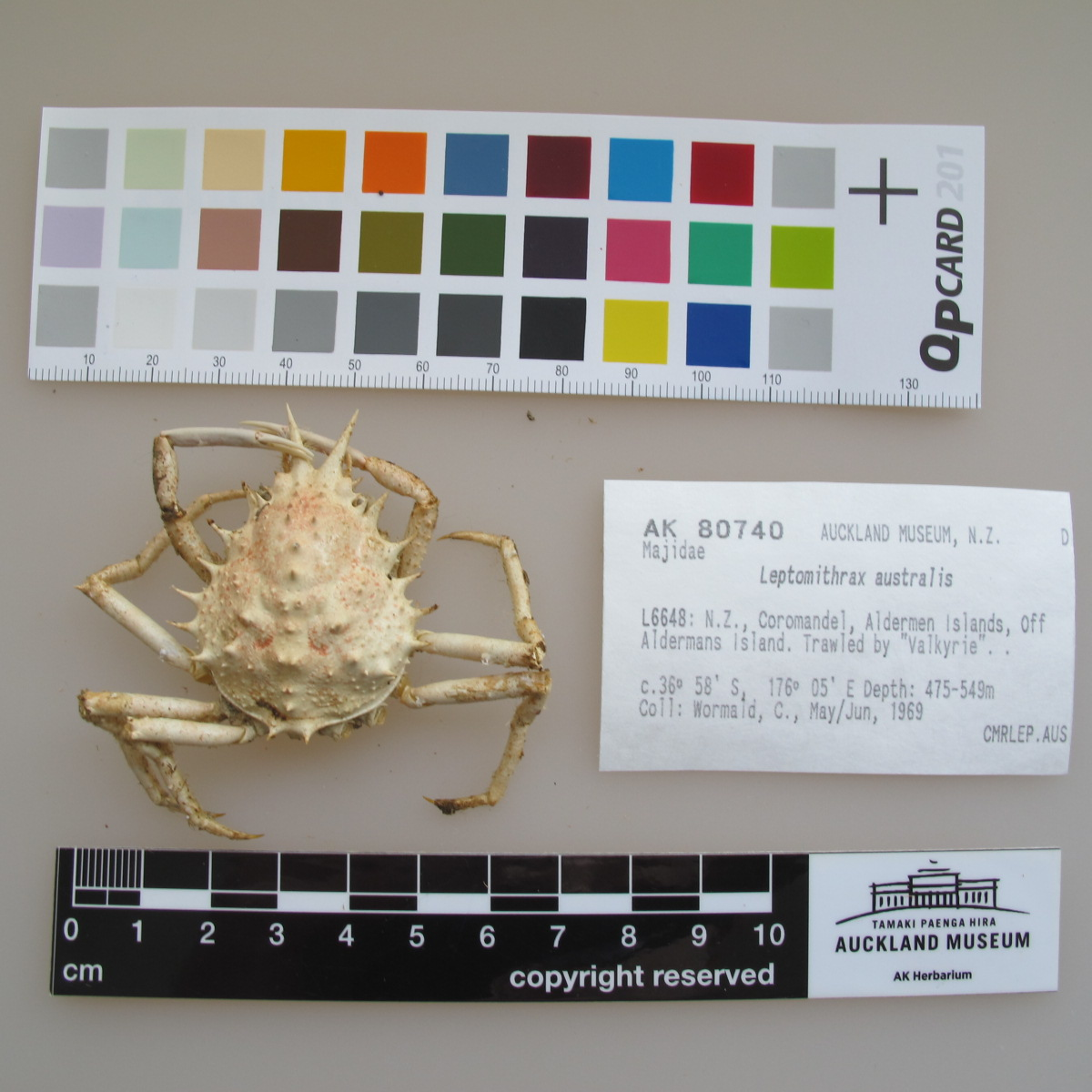

Scientific classification
- Kingdom: Animalia
- Phylum: Arthropoda
- Class: Malacostraca
- Order: Decapoda
- Suborder: Pleocyemata
- Infraorder: Brachyura
- Family: Majidae
- Genus: Leptomithrax
- Species: L. australis

Binomial name
- Leptomithrax australis (Jacquinot in Jacquinot & Lucas, 1853)

Synonyms
- Maia australis

= Leptomithrax australis =

Species of crabs

Leptomithrax australis, or the giant masking crab, is a species of spider crab in the genus Leptomithrax. It has been found in the Southwest Pacific region. It lives both shallow and deep waters, with a zone depth of 550 m (1,800 ft).

== Description ==
It has a pyriform carapace and elongated walking legs. The carapace demonstrates moderate convexity with well-defined regions separated by distinct grooves. Unlike some congeners, L. australis presents a less pronounced pear shape compared to species like L. longimanus, appearing more oval in overall outline. It reaches up to 90 mm (3.5 in) long and females up to 60 mm (2.4 in). The carapace of L. australis displays numerous tubercles and spines. The rostral region features two short, stout spines that are characteristic of the species. The hepatic margin typically bears two widely spaced spines, while the branchial margin supports four prominent conical spines with several smaller spines or tubercles positioned between them.

The dorsal surface exhibits extensive tuberculation, with rows of tubercles extending posteriorly from the rostral base along each side of the midline. This tuberculate pattern continues at least to the level of the postorbital region, contributing to the species' distinctive appearance.

== Regional occurrences ==
Comprehensive biogeographic databases indicate the presence of L. australis in New Zealand waters, where it represents part of a diverse spider crab fauna. The New Zealand region supports multiple Leptomithrax species, reflecting the area's importance as a center of diversity for this genus.
