= Maja capensis =

Scientific classification
- Kingdom: Animalia
- Phylum: Arthropoda
- Clade: Pancrustacea
- Class: Malacostraca
- Order: Decapoda
- Suborder: Pleocyemata
- Infraorder: Brachyura
- Family: Majidae
- Genus: Maja
- Species: M. capensis

Binomial name
- Maja capensis Ortmann, 1894

Species of crab

Maja capensis, the Agulhas spider crab, is a species of crab in the family Majidae.

== Distribution ==
The Agulhas spider crab is known from the west coast of Africa and round the South African coast to Durban in 2–100 m of water.

== Description ==
The Agulhas spider crab may grow to 100 millimetres (3.9 in). It has an orange to red carapace covered with short spines and protruding granules, and is often camouflaged with attached animals. It has two double-pointed projections extending between its eyes. The front margins of its carapace are serrated.
