= Choniognathus elegans =

Scientific classification
- Kingdom: Animalia
- Phylum: Arthropoda
- Class: Malacostraca
- Order: Decapoda
- Suborder: Pleocyemata
- Infraorder: Brachyura
- Family: Majidae
- Genus: Choniognathus
- Species: C. elegans

Binomial name
- Choniognathus elegans (Stebbing, 1921)

Synonyms
- Eurynome elegans Stebbing, 1921

Species of crab

Choniognathus elegans is a species of crabs in the family Majidae. It is found in South Africa.
