= Naxia tumida =

Scientific classification
- Kingdom: Animalia
- Phylum: Arthropoda
- Clade: Pancrustacea
- Class: Malacostraca
- Order: Decapoda
- Suborder: Pleocyemata
- Infraorder: Brachyura
- Family: Majidae
- Genus: Naxia
- Species: N. tumida

Binomial name
- Naxia tumida (Dana, 1852)

Synonyms
- Halimus tumidus Dana, 1852

Species of crab

Naxia tumida, the little seaweed crab, dresser crab, or decorator crab, is a small crab of the family Majidae (with a carapace up to 4 centimetres or 1.6 inches in diameter) that is common in rocky intertidal and subtidal areas on the temperate coasts of Australia, including parts of Victoria, New South Wales, Tasmania, South Australia and Western Australia. It is usually found covered in seaweed that acts as camouflage, attached to the hooks on its shell. It attaches the algae or seaweed with a secretion that becomes adhesive when hardened.

Naxia tumida was discovered by the United States Exploring Expedition and described by James Dwight Dana, originally under the name Halimus tumidus. The syntypes appear to have been lost.
