= Naxia =

Scientific classification
- Kingdom: Animalia
- Phylum: Arthropoda
- Clade: Pancrustacea
- Class: Malacostraca
- Order: Decapoda
- Suborder: Pleocyemata
- Infraorder: Brachyura
- Family: Majidae
- Subfamily: Majinae
- Genus: Naxia; Latreille, 1825

Genus of crabs

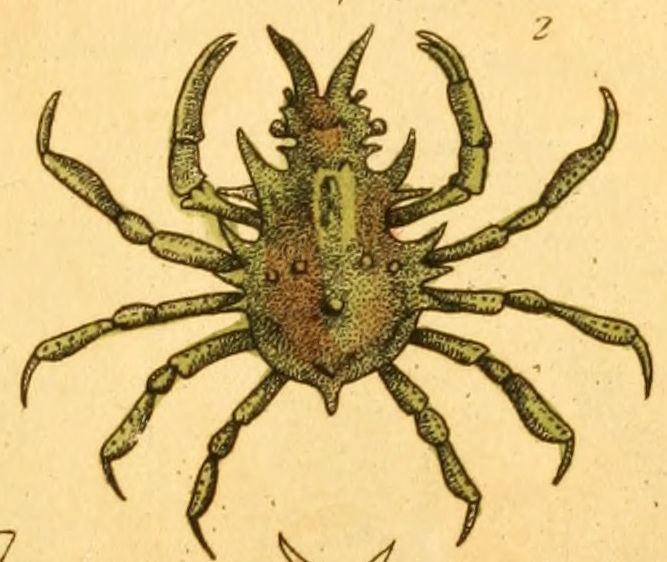
Naxia aries

Naxia is a genus of crabs in the family Majidae, containing the following species:

- Naxia aries (H. Milne-Edwards, 1834)
- Naxia aurita (Latreille, 1825)
- Naxia spinosa (Hess, 1865)
- Naxia tumida (Dana, 1851)
