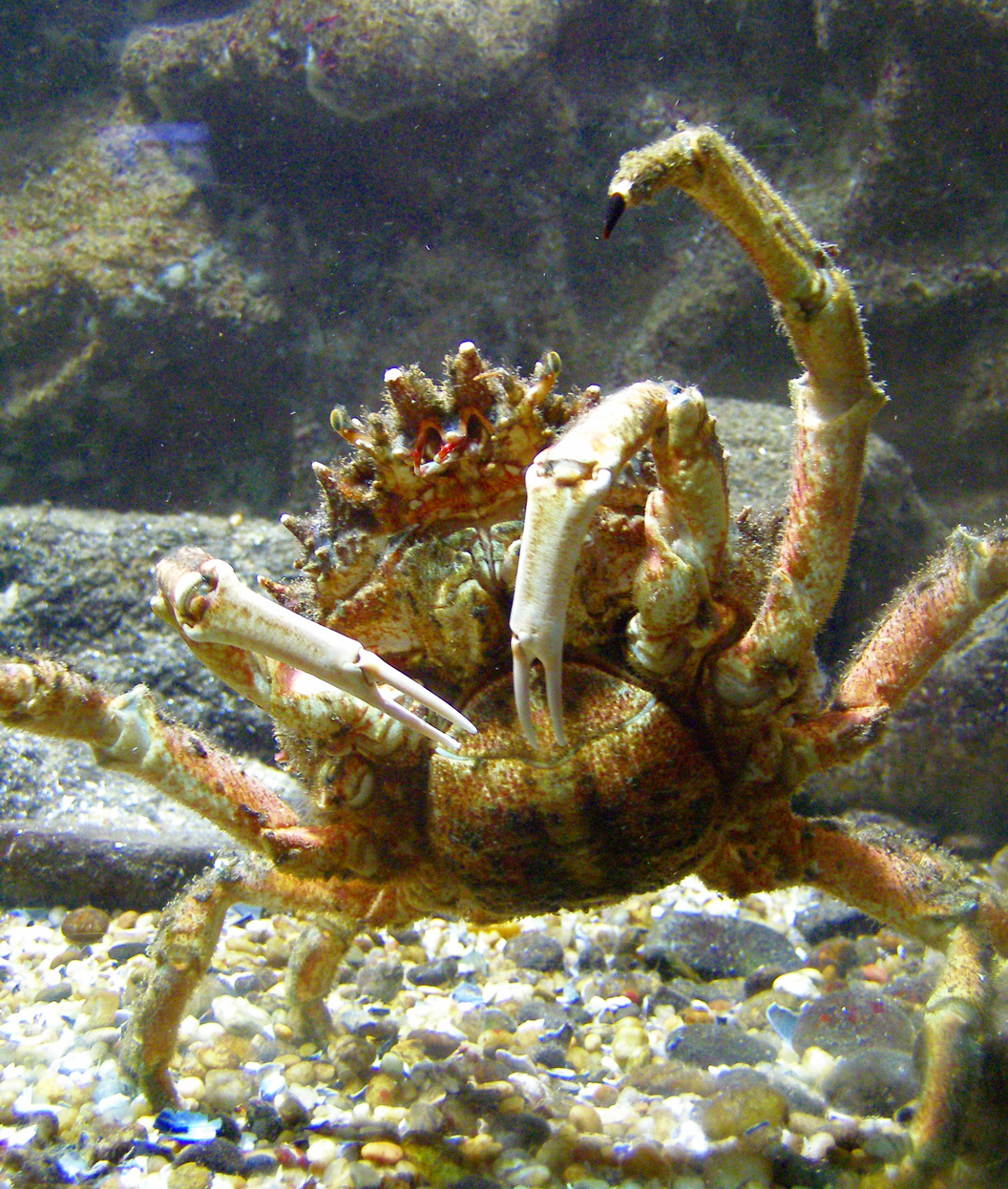
- Maja squinado

Scientific classification
- Domain: Eukaryota
- Kingdom: Animalia
- Phylum: Arthropoda
- Class: Malacostraca
- Order: Decapoda
- Suborder: Pleocyemata
- Infraorder: Brachyura
- Family: Majidae
- Genus: Maja; Lamarck, 1801

Type species
- Cancer squinado Herbst, 1788

= Maja (crab) =

Genus of crabs

Maja is a genus of majid crabs erected by Jean-Baptiste Lamarck in 1801. It includes the following extant species:

- Maja africana Griffin & Tranter, 1996
- Maja bisarmata Rathbun, 1916
- Maja brachydactyla Balss, 1922
- Maja capensis Ortmann, 1894
- Maja compressipes (Miers, 1879)
- Maja confragosa Griffin & Tranter, 1996
- Maja crispata Risso, 1827
- Maja erinacea de Ninni, 1924
- Maja gibba Alcock, 1899
- Maja goltziana d'Oliviera, 1888
- Maja gracilipes Chen & Ng, 1999
- Maja japonica Rathbun, 1932
- Maja kominatoensis Kubo, 1936
- Maja linapacanensis Rathbun, 1916
- Maja miersii Walker, 1887
- Maja sakaii Takeda & Miyake, 1969
- Maja spinigera (De Haan, 1837)
- Maja squinado (Herbst, 1788)
- Maja suluensis Rathbun, 1916
- Maja tuberculata De Haan, 1839

A further 12 species are known from fossils.
