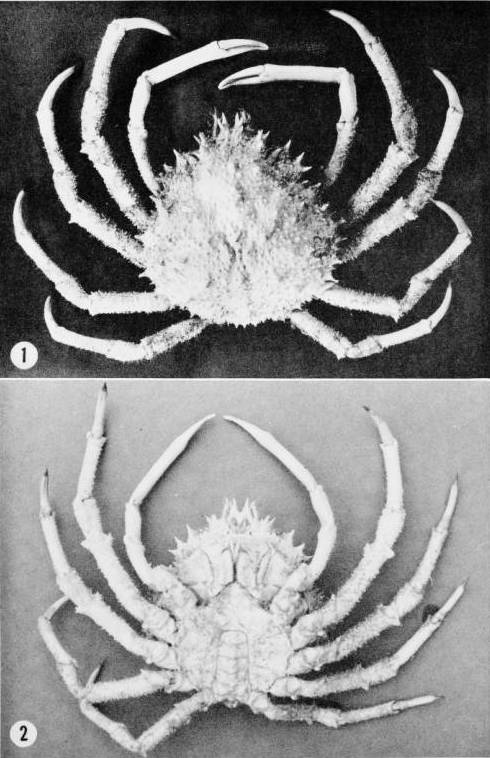
- Maiopsis panamensis Faxon, male. 1: dorsal view. 2: ventral view

Scientific classification
- Kingdom: Animalia
- Phylum: Arthropoda
- Class: Malacostraca
- Order: Decapoda
- Suborder: Pleocyemata
- Infraorder: Brachyura
- Family: Majidae
- Genus: Maiopsis; Faxon, 1893
- Species: M. panamensis

Binomial name
- Maiopsis panamensis Faxon, 1893

= Maiopsis =

Genus of crabs

Maiopsis, also known as the Panamic spider crab or Ecuadorian king crab, is a large deep-water spider crab genus. It contains a single species, Maiopsis panamensis. It is found in the Gulf of California, from Peru to Ecuador and the Galapagos.

== Description ==
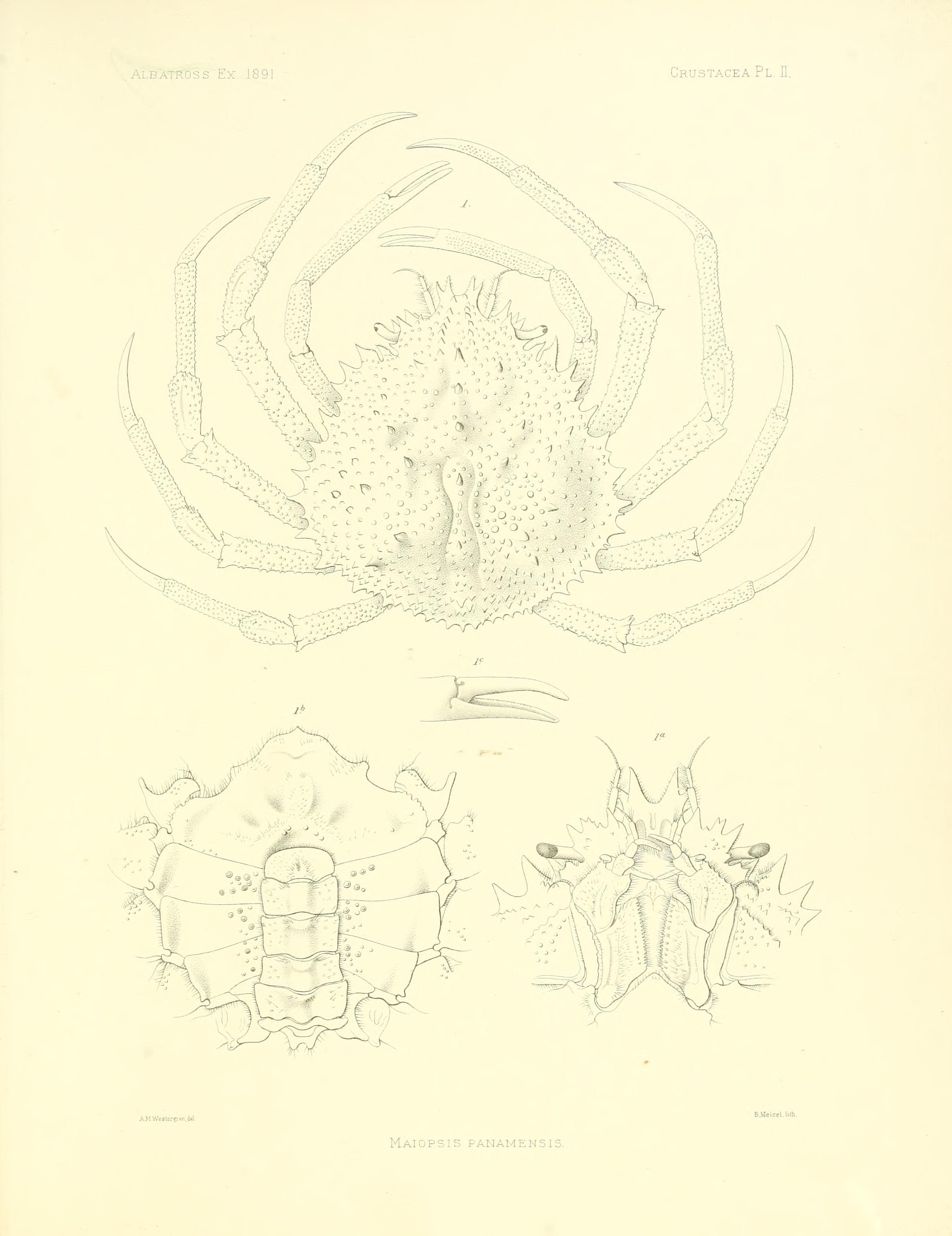
Illustration of M. panamensis.

It has a bright red colour and an oval-shaped carapace with long legs, the carapace being measured as large as 240 mm (9.4 in) both in length and width, with legspans of up to 300 mm (12 in) and weighing up to 3.9 kg (8.6 lb); this makes it the largest brachyuran crab known in the Gulf of California and the world's second largest spider crab species. The studies of this species are not well known and rare; the first sighting was from the coast of Panama in 1893. There were no reports of this species in the Mexican waters until 1979.
