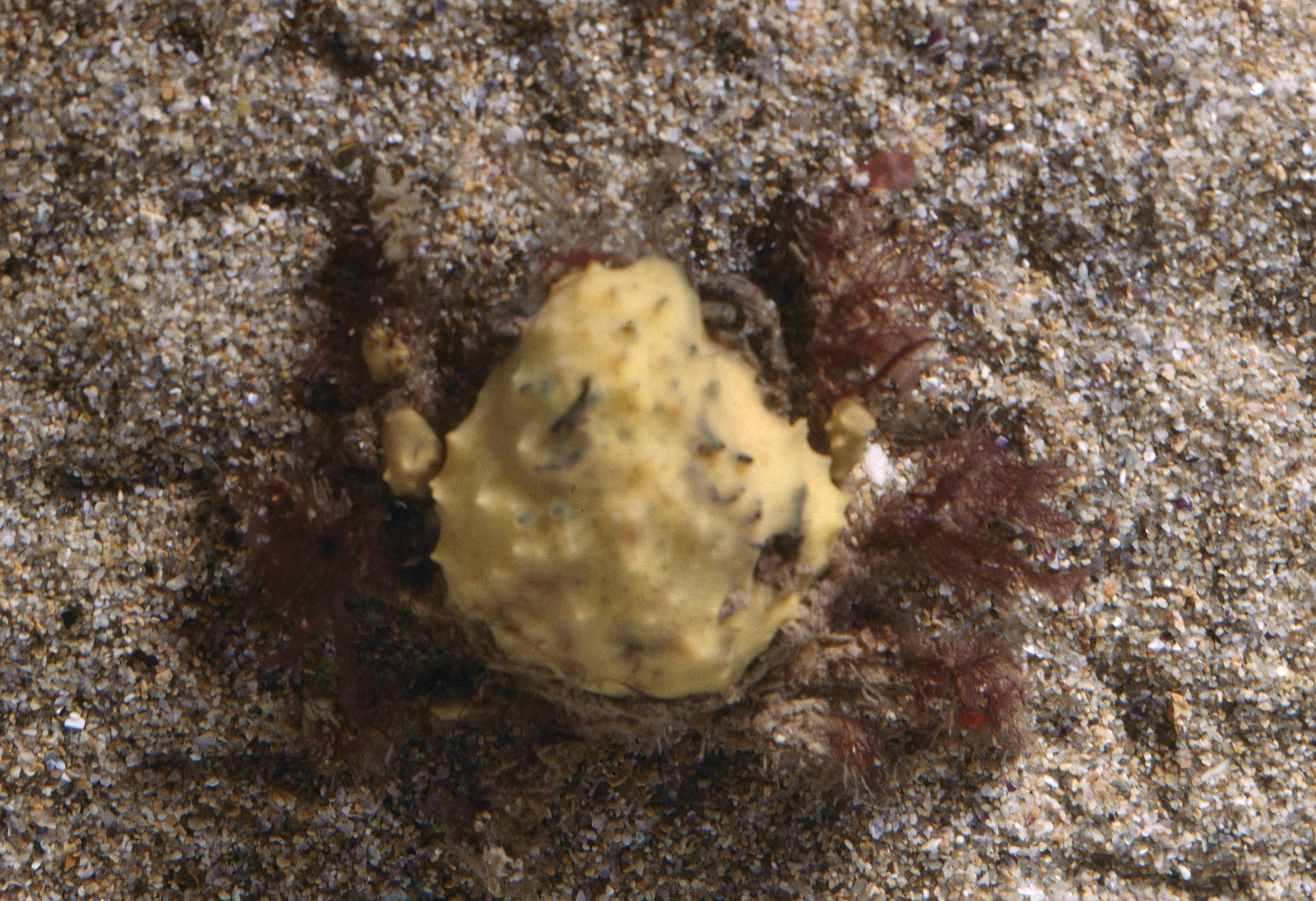
- Notomithrax minor

Scientific classification
- Kingdom: Animalia
- Phylum: Arthropoda
- Clade: Pancrustacea
- Class: Malacostraca
- Order: Decapoda
- Suborder: Pleocyemata
- Infraorder: Brachyura
- Family: Majidae
- Subfamily: Majinae
- Genus: Notomithrax; Griffin, 1963

Type species
- Paramithrax peronii H. Milne-Edwards, 1834

= Notomithrax =

Genus of crabs

Notomithrax is a genus of crabs of the family Majidae, containing four species:

- Notomithrax minor (Filhol, 1885)
- Notomithrax spinosus (H. Milne-Edwards, 1834)
- Notomithrax peronii (Miers, 1879)
- Notomithrax ursus (Herbst, 1788)
