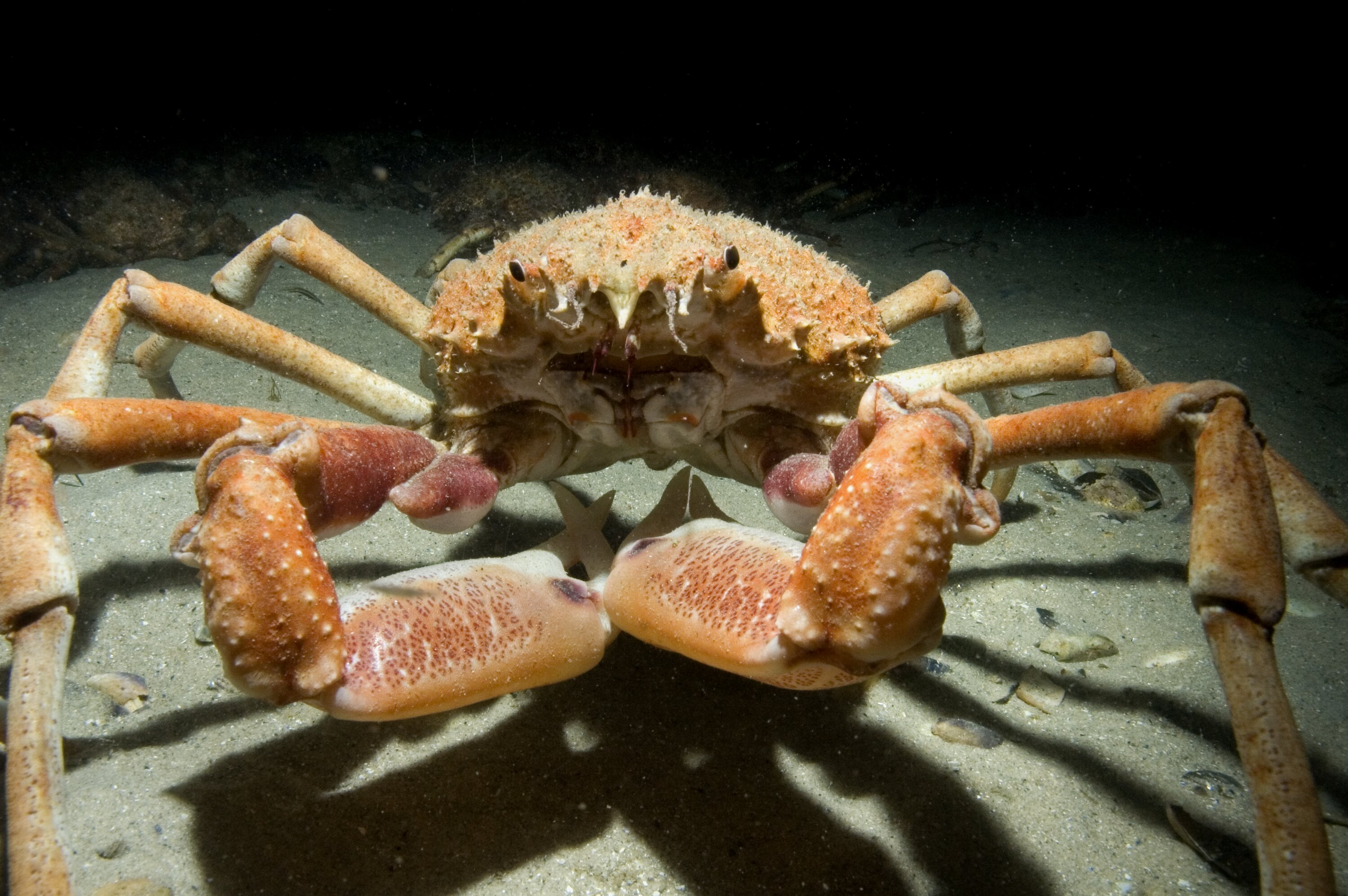
- Source

Scientific classification
- Kingdom: Animalia
- Phylum: Arthropoda
- Clade: Pancrustacea
- Class: Malacostraca
- Order: Decapoda
- Suborder: Pleocyemata
- Infraorder: Brachyura
- Family: Majidae
- Genus: Leptomithrax
- Species: L. gaimardii

Binomial name
- Leptomithrax gaimardii (H.Milne Edwards, 1834)

Synonyms
- Leptomithrax spinulosus Haswell, 1880; Paramithrax (Leptomithrax) australiensis Miers, 1876; Paramithrax gaimardii H.Milne Edwards, 1834

= Leptomithrax gaimardii =

Species of crab – Great spider-crab

Leptomithrax gaimardii (common name - Giant spider-crab) is a species of crab in the Majidae family, first described by Henri Milne-Edwards in 1834 as Paramithrax gaimardii, from a specimen (erroneously said to be) found in New Zealand waters by Joseph Paul Gaimard who is honoured by the species epithet.

It is found in coastal waters of Western Australia, South Australia, Victoria, New South Wales, and Tasmania.

== Description ==
This crab has a red-brown rounded carapace up to 16 cm (6.3 in) wide and has a leg span of up to 40 cm (16 in). Sometimes seaweed and sponges attach to its body.

When breeding, these crabs form groups of often greater than 100 crabs. Breeding occurs just before winter moulting when they are vulnerable to predation because of their soft shells. The large congregations make them less vulnerable. The crab is a scavenger, and is found in seaweed, reef and sand areas at depths of up to 820 m (2,690 ft).
