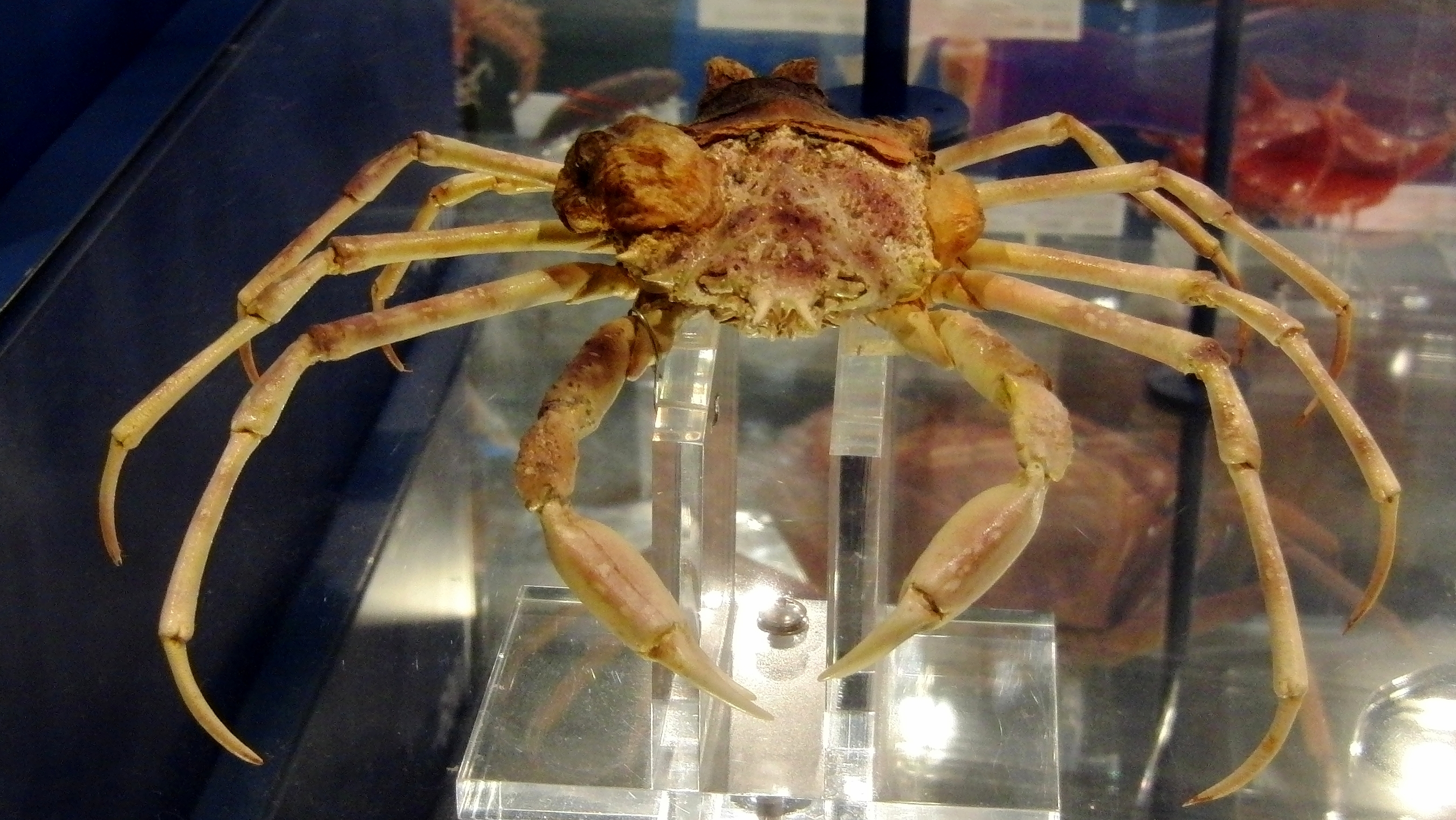
- Stuffed specimen of Leptomithrax edwardsii. Exhibit in the National Museum of Nature and Science, Tokyo, Japan.

Scientific classification
- Domain: Eukaryota
- Kingdom: Animalia
- Phylum: Arthropoda
- Class: Malacostraca
- Order: Decapoda
- Suborder: Pleocyemata
- Infraorder: Brachyura
- Family: Majidae
- Subfamily: Majinae
- Genus: Leptomithrax; Miers, 1876

= Leptomithrax =

Leptomithrax Temporal range: 37.2–Recent Ma

Genus of crabs

Leptomithrax is a genus of crabs in the family Majidae, first described by Edward J. Miers in 1876. They have been on Earth for 37.2 million years.

== Species ==
=== Extant species ===
- Leptomithrax australis (Jacquinot in Jacquinot & Lucas, 1853)
- Leptomithrax bifidus (Ortmann, 1893)
- Leptomithrax depressus Richer de Forges, 1993
- Leptomithrax edwardsii (De Haan, 1835)
- Leptomithrax eldredgei Richer de Forges & Ng, 2015
- Leptomithrax gaimardii (H. Milne Edwards, 1834)
- Leptomithrax garricki Griffin, 1966
- Leptomithrax globifer Rathbun, 1918
- Leptomithrax longimanus (Miers, 1876)
- Leptomithrax longipes (G. M. Thomson, 1902)
- Leptomithrax lowryi Richer de Forges & Ng, 2023
- Leptomithrax mortenseni Bennett, 1964
- Leptomithrax sinensis Rathbun, 1916
- Leptomithrax sternocostulatus (H. Milne Edwards, 1851)
- Leptomithrax tuberculatus Whitelegge, 1900
- Leptomithrax waitei (Whitelegge, 1900)

=== Extinct species ===
- Leptomithrax atavus Glaessner 1960
- Leptomithrax elegans Jenkins 1985
- Leptomithrax elongatus McLay 1995
- Leptomithrax garthi McLay et al. 1995
- Leptomithrax griffini Feldmann and Maxwell 1990
- Leptomithrax irirangi Glaessner 1960
- Leptomithrax martensis Jenkins 1985
- Leptomithrax uruti Glaessner 1960
