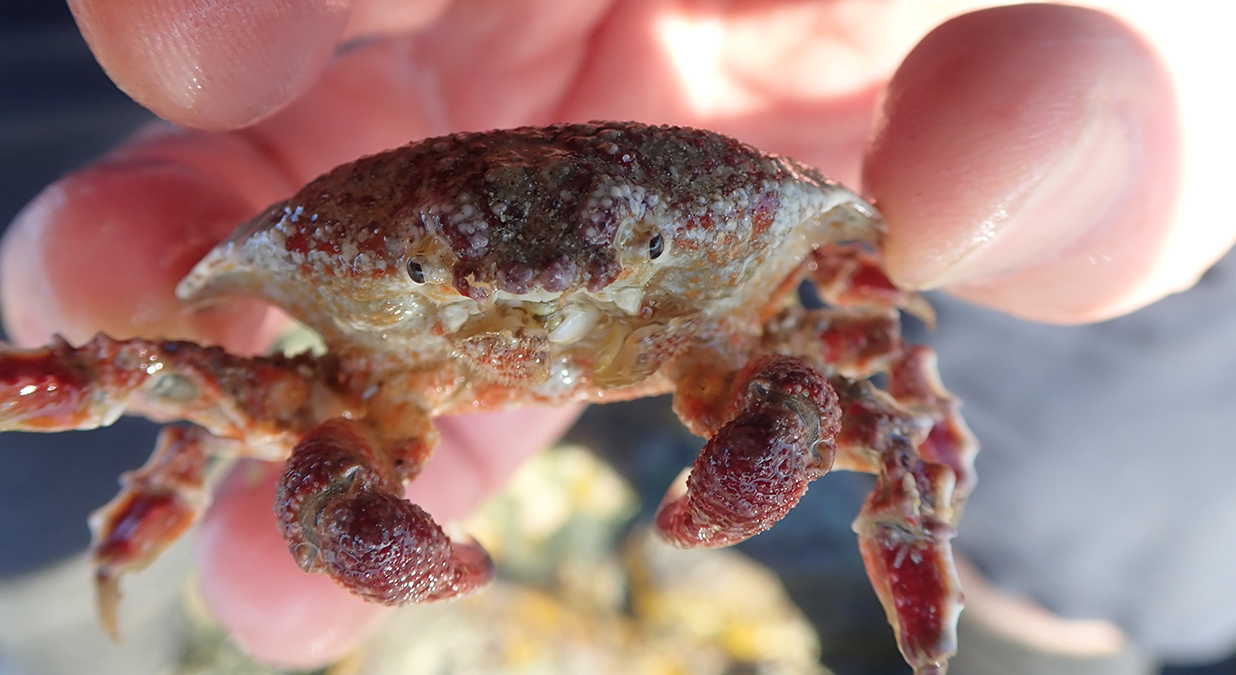

Scientific classification
- Kingdom: Animalia
- Phylum: Arthropoda
- Class: Malacostraca
- Order: Decapoda
- Suborder: Pleocyemata
- Infraorder: Brachyura
- Family: Majidae
- Subfamily: Eurynolambrinae; Števčić, 1994
- Genus: Eurynolambrus; H. Milne Edwards & Lucas, 1841
- Species: E. australis

Binomial name
- Eurynolambrus australis H. Milne Edwards & Lucas, 1841

= Eurynolambrus =

Species of crab

Eurynolambrus australis, commonly known as the triangle crab, and by its Māori name riangi, is a small species of crab that is widespread throughout New Zealand. It is the only species in the genus Eurynolambrus.

== Habitat ==
Eurynolambrus australis is commonly found among stones and under rocks in the lower and sub tidal region of the intertidal zone where it can reach depths of up to 80 m. It is often found in rock pools with coralline turf.

== Description ==
Adults are between 50 – 65 mm in size with a broad triangle-shaped carapace that extends over the leg base. This can be white, pink or bright red in colour with white, grey-brown, and yellow markings. Legs are short and flat with irregular crests. Their colour can be mottled with orange, dark red and white. They fold neatly underneath the carapace. Chelipeds have a rough and pitted surface and curve inwards. They are purple in colour with a white inner surface. The antennules are usually a pale yellow colour. The eyestalks are red.

== Behaviour & diet ==
The triangle crab is a scavenger feeder. It feeds mostly on coralline alga, which is thought to cause the bright red pigmentation on its shell. It also feeds on red and green algae, as well as amphipods, isopods and decapods.

It is a cryptic species that defends itself from predation with camouflage. Some divers and amateur observers suggest it is more active at night and may be nocturnal.
