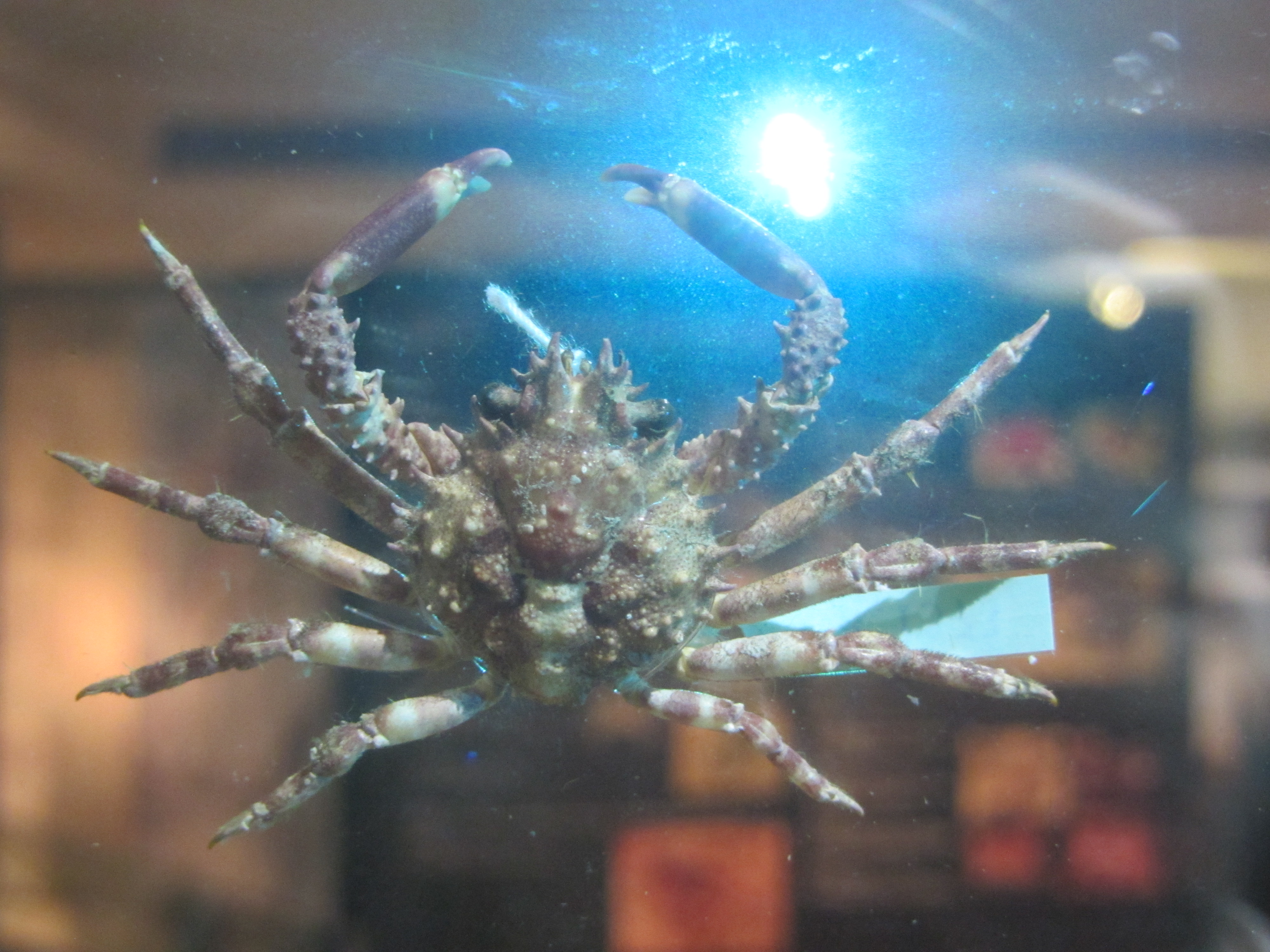
- Specimen of Schizophrys aspera

Scientific classification
- Kingdom: Animalia
- Phylum: Arthropoda
- Clade: Pancrustacea
- Class: Malacostraca
- Order: Decapoda
- Suborder: Pleocyemata
- Infraorder: Brachyura
- Family: Majidae
- Genus: Schizophrys; White, 1848

= Schizophrys =

Genus of crabs

Schizophrys is a genus of crabs in the family Majidae, containing the following species:

- Schizophrys aspera (H. Milne Edwards, 1834)
- Schizophrys dahlak (Griffin & Tranter, 1986)
- Schizophrys dama (Herbst, 1804)
- Schizophrys dichotomus (Latreille, 1831)
- Schizophrys pakistanensis (Tirmizi & Kazmi, 1995)
- Schizophrys rufescens (Griffin & Tranter, 1986)
- Schizophrys serratus (White, 1847) (nomen nudum)
- Schizophrys spiniger (White, 1847) (nomen nudum)
- Schizophrys hilensis (Rathbun, 1906) accepted as Schizophroida hilensis (Rathbun, 1906)
- Schizophrys serratus (White, 1848) accepted as Schizophrys aspera (H. Milne Edwards, 1834)
- Schizophrys spiniger (White, 1848) accepted as Cyclax spinicinctus (Heller, 1861)
