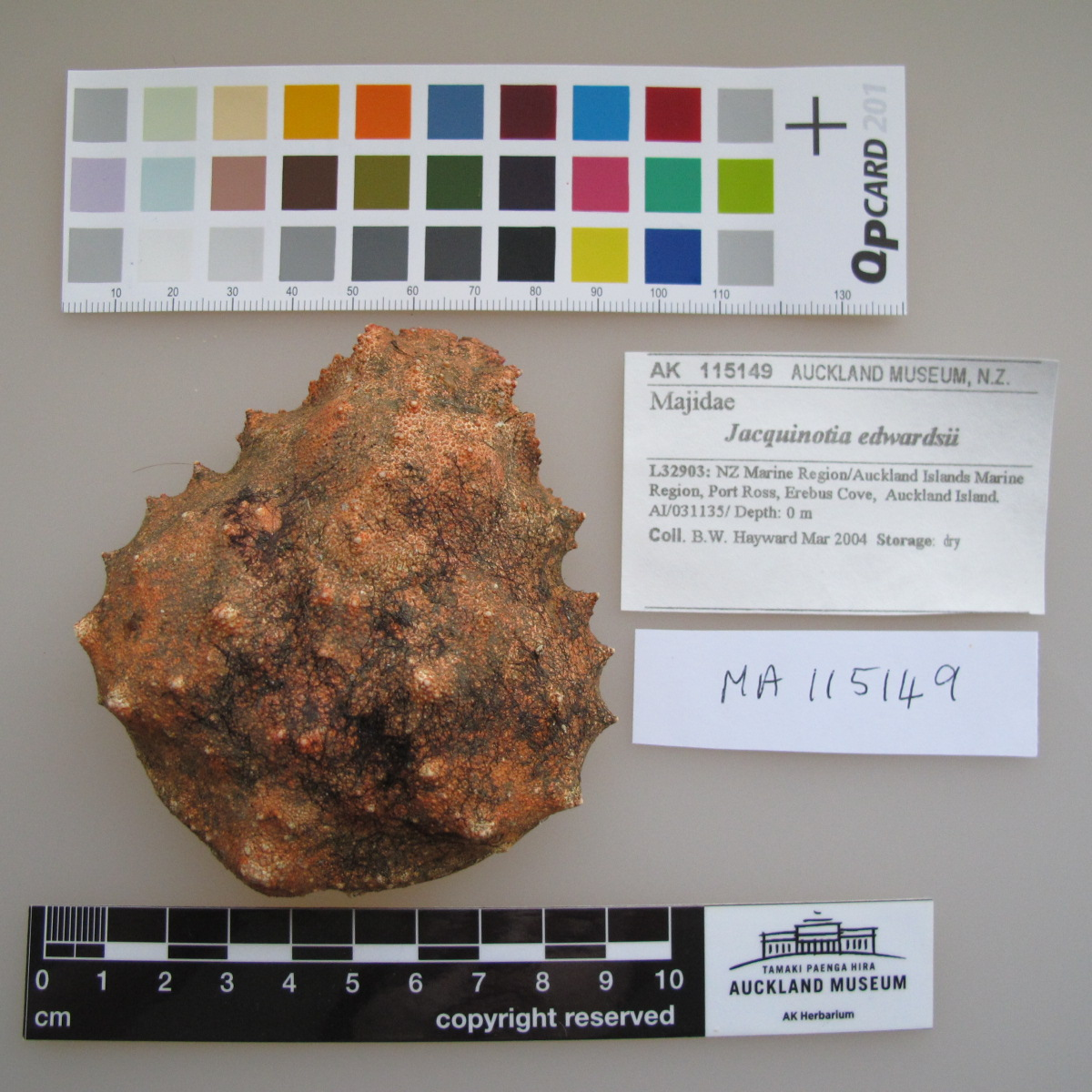

Scientific classification
- Kingdom: Animalia
- Phylum: Arthropoda
- Class: Malacostraca
- Order: Decapoda
- Suborder: Pleocyemata
- Infraorder: Brachyura
- Family: Majidae
- Genus: Jacquinotia; Rathbun, 1915
- Species: J. edwardsii

Binomial name
- Jacquinotia edwardsii (Jacquinot in Jacquinot & Lucas, 1853)

= Jacquinotia =

Jacquinotia Temporal range: Late Pliocene–Recent

Genus of crabs

Jacquinotia is a genus of spider crab that contains one species, Jacquinotia edwardsii. J. edwardsii is the largest crab in New Zealand and is commonly known as the southern spider crab or the giant spider crab.

== Description ==
Jacquinotia edwardsii has a rough, triangular-knobbed shape carapace, which is dirty white in colour. Males are much larger than females and reach a legspan of up to 100 cm (39 in) and a carapace length up to 20 cm (7.9 in).

== Distribution ==
Jacquinotia edwardsii is found in southern New Zealand, from Mernoo Gap to the Campbell Islands, in the intertidal zone and to a depth of 500 m (1,600 ft). Fossils have been found from the late Pleistocene to the early Pliocene which are referable to J. edwardsii or – for the oldest known specimen – very similar.

== Ecology ==
The maturity size for males is about 110 mm (4.3 in), and 100 mm (3.9 in) for females, but the age for the southern spider crabs are unknown. The larvae start between September and November. Males may consume other shells, while females are detritivores. Jacquinotia edwardsii is commercially fished.
