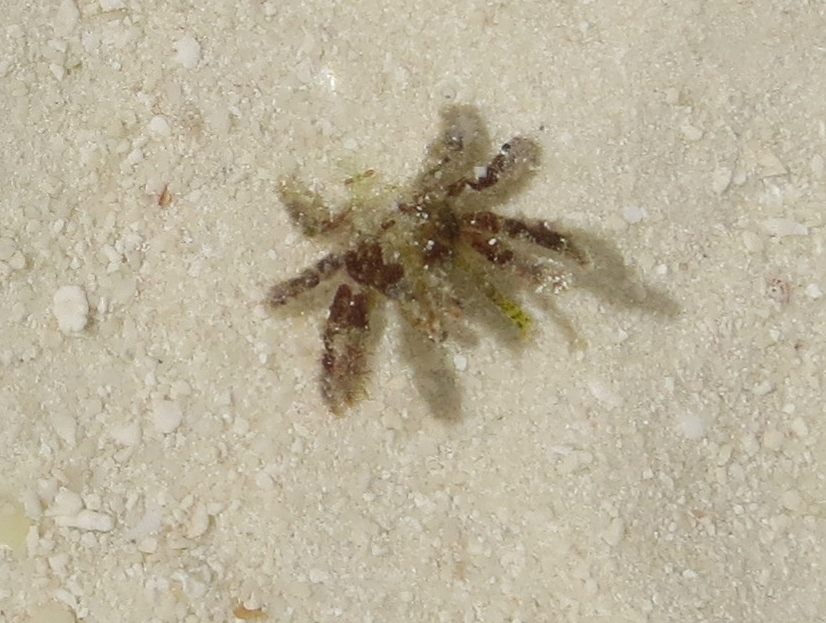
- Cyclocoeloma tuberculata

Scientific classification
- Kingdom: Animalia
- Phylum: Arthropoda
- Clade: Pancrustacea
- Class: Malacostraca
- Order: Decapoda
- Suborder: Pleocyemata
- Infraorder: Brachyura
- Family: Majidae
- Genus: Cyclocoeloma
- Species: C. tuberculata

Binomial name
- Cyclocoeloma tuberculata Miers, 1880

= Cyclocoeloma =

Genus of crabs

Cyclocoeloma is a genus of crabs in the family Majidae, containing the single species Cyclocoeloma tuberculata.

== Description ==
Cyclocoeloma tuberculata is a small size spider crab, its carapace reach an average length of 45mm from the rostral area to posterior tip. The back side of the carapace is rounded but the rostral area is going relatively far ahead and looks like a head with lateral position of the eyes. However, it's quite difficult to observe the carapace's shape on a living animal because it's covered with corallmophs. The four ambulacra, when not too much decorated, are creamy colors with brown bands. In the majids, the decoration is fixed on the carapace and legs via hooked hairs. The claws are quite small and are also used to decorate themselves. The reason they cover their body is to camouflage themselves from potential predators, especially during the day; C. tuberculata fixes corallimorphs of the family Discosomatidae to its carapace, and soft corals of the family Xeniidae to its legs.

== Distribution ==
Cyclocoeloma tuberculata is widespread throughout the tropical waters of the central Indo-Pacific region.
