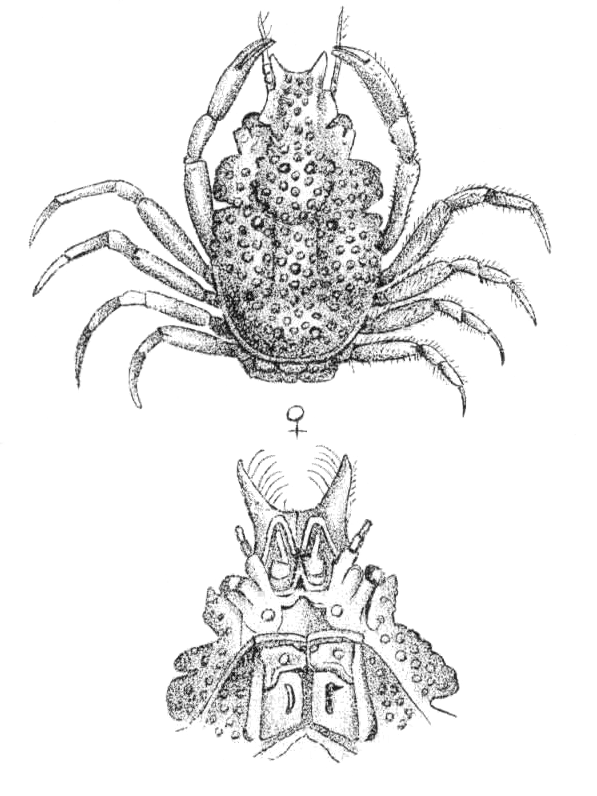
- Illustration of choniognathus granulosus by Baker W.H. (1906)

Scientific classification
- Kingdom: Animalia
- Phylum: Arthropoda
- Clade: Pancrustacea
- Class: Malacostraca
- Order: Decapoda
- Suborder: Pleocyemata
- Infraorder: Brachyura
- Family: Majidae
- Subfamily: Majinae
- Genus: Choniognathus; Rathbun, 1932

Species
- Choniognathus elegans (Stebbing, 1921); Choniognathus granulosus (Baker, 1906); Choniognathus reini (Balss, 1924); Choniognathus verhoeffei (Balss, 1929)

= Choniognathus =

Genus of crabs

Choniognathus is a genus of crabs in the family Majidae of the order Decapoda. It is composed of several species of marine spider crabs.
