= Hemus (crab) =

Scientific classification
- Domain: Eukaryota
- Kingdom: Animalia
- Phylum: Arthropoda
- Class: Malacostraca
- Order: Decapoda
- Suborder: Pleocyemata
- Infraorder: Brachyura
- Family: Majidae
- Genus: Hemus; A. Milne-Edwards, 1875

Genus of crabs

Hemus is a genus of spider crab in the family Majidae. It contains four species:

- Hemus analogus Rathbun, 1898
- Hemus cristulipes A. Milne-Edwards, 1875
- Hemus finneganae Garth, 1958
- Hemus magalae Windsor & Felder, 2011
