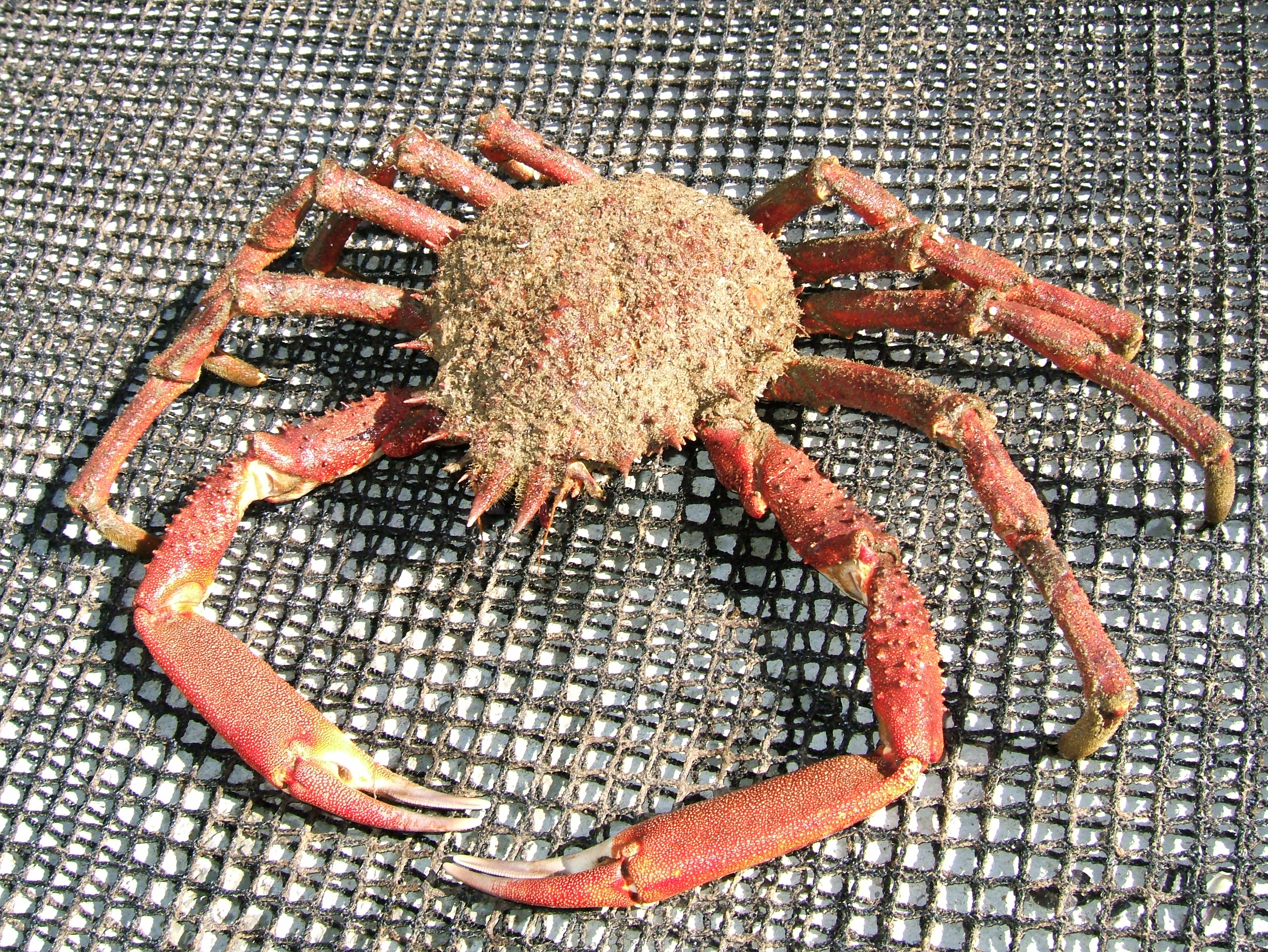

Scientific classification
- Kingdom: Animalia
- Phylum: Arthropoda
- Clade: Pancrustacea
- Class: Malacostraca
- Order: Decapoda
- Suborder: Pleocyemata
- Infraorder: Brachyura
- Family: Majidae
- Genus: Maja
- Species: M. squinado

Binomial name
- Maja squinado (Herbst, 1788)

= Maja squinado =

Species of crab

Maja squinado (the European spider crab, spiny spider crab or spinous spider crab) is a species of migratory crab found in the Mediterranean Sea. The appearance of the European spider crab is similar to the much larger Japanese spider crab, although the European spider crab belongs to the family Majidae, and the Japanese spider crab belongs to a different family of crabs, the Macrocheiridae.

== Taxonomy ==
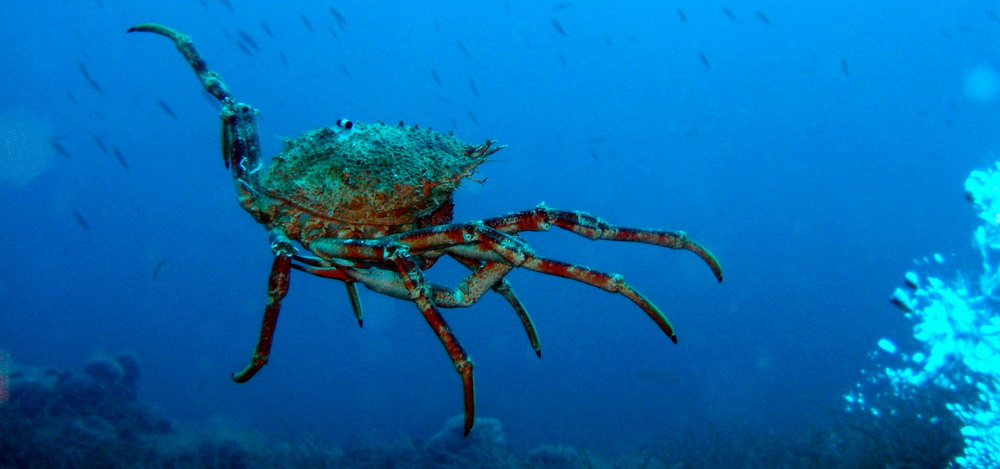
A spiny spider crab swimming in a marine reserve in the Balearic Islands

A review of the species complex around M. squinado was able to differentiate between specimens from the Mediterranean Sea and those from the Atlantic, and concluded that the Atlantic specimens were a separate species, called Maja brachydactyla Balss, 1922. The specific epithet squinado derives from the Provençal name for the species – squinado, esquinade, esquinado or esquinadoun — recorded by Rondelet as early as 1554.

== Young ==
The young of M. squinado are slightly longer than 1mm after hatching, and weigh approximately 0.12 mg at this time. Within 4–8 days, the larva molts numerous times, finally ending with morphological changes that presumably include the further development and increase in size of the cephalothorax. In a second phase, the Carapace grows to a length of approx. 2mm, and weighs approx. 0.3 mg.

The larva then undergoes metamorphosis to the first juvenile instar, and changes its planktonic life to a benthic one (living on the sea floor). Its appearance is also similar to that of the adult animal. From this stage only growth and the formation of sexual maturity follows. In observations under laboratory conditions, approx. 10.5% of the hatched zoea made it to this stage. The same conditions in terms of food, temperature and the like cannot be created in a laboratory. Animals in the first juvenile stage perform their first molt about 21 days after hatching, and therefore enter the second juvenile stage.

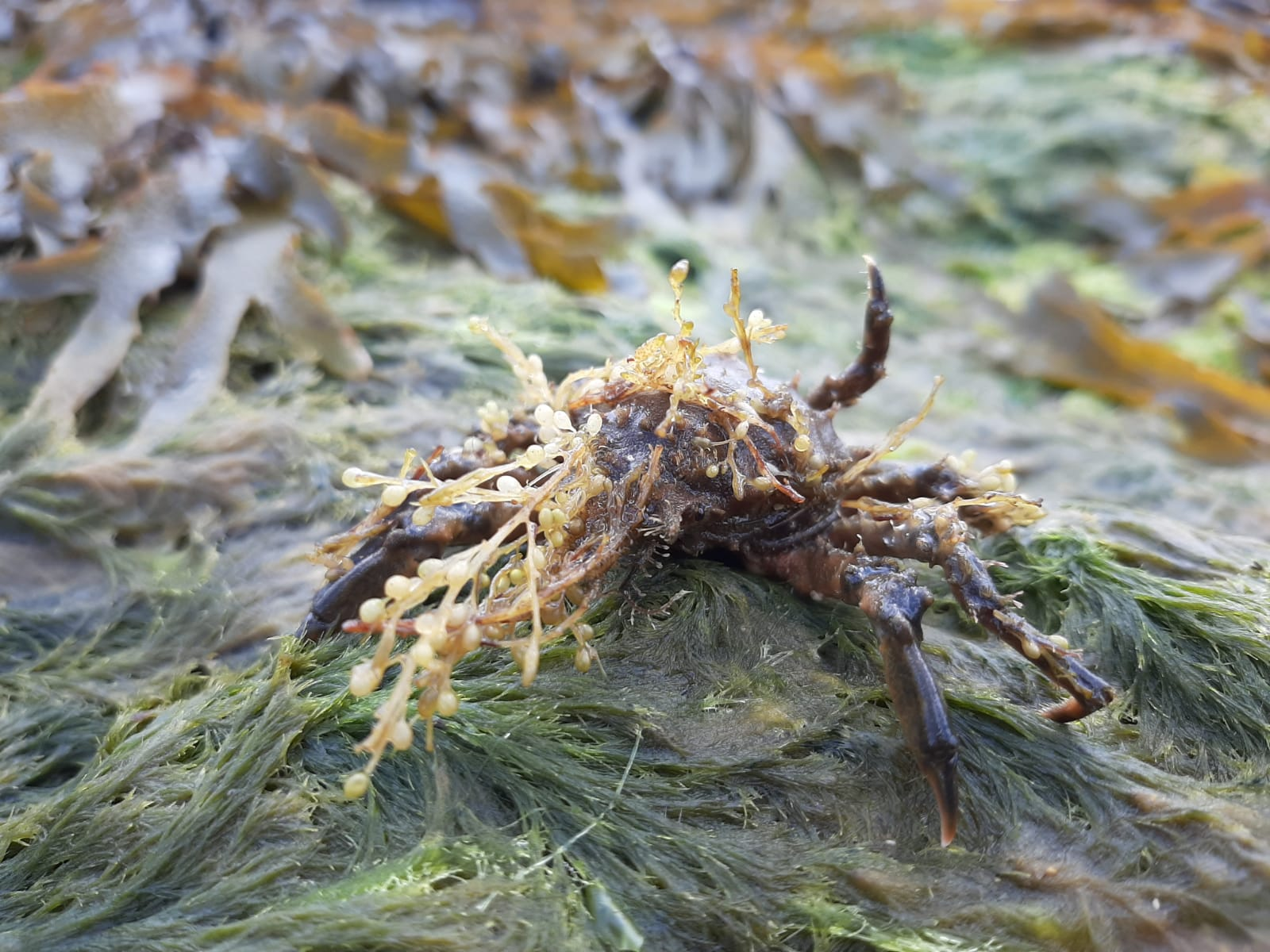
Maja squinado near the beginning of the last growing phase, camouflaged in sea flora.

Here there is a considerable increase in the length of the carapace to approx. 4.51 mm. The second molt marks the beginning of the third juvenile stage, the animal now has the appearance of the adult, with a carapace length of approx. 5.63 mm, but is not sexually mature.

Juvenile animals spend another 2 years moulting and growing in size. The juvenile animals live in shallow water in winter, between rocks in coastal kelp forests. They spend the summer on small rocky reefs at a depth of only about 4 m. After this time, they reach a carapace length between 6–13 cm, with no noticeable sex-specific differences. During this time they are not yet sexually mature.

There are two main periods for the critical molts that follow the approximately two-year period of growth leading to sexual maturity: the first, the prepubertal, in April, and the second, the pubertal, from July to October. However, in captive animals it has been noticed that in very large individuals that are in the phase before one of the two molts, one molt may be lost entirely, or be very late. Likewise, three molts have been observed on some individual specimens. The average time interval between the two critical molts is 104 days. Typically, the carapace length in animals that are already comparatively large increases less after molting, relative to the initial size, than that of smaller animals. This also explains why there is a smaller increase in length (approx. 27%) in the pubescent molt than in the prepubertal (approx. 36%).

== Diet and behavior ==
As with many species, M. squinado's behavior is dependent on many things. Some of the factors include size, life history, and age. Migrations generally take place in autumn, with some crabs covering over 100 mi (160 km) in 8 months. All crabs are vulnerable to predation when moulting, and M. squinado becomes gregarious around that time, presumably for defense against predators. Females can produce up to four broods per year. M. squinado has been documented to feed on macroalgae and benthic invertebrates. From a 1992 study done in Galicia, seaweeds from the Laminariaceae, Corallina spp., molluscs, the gastropods Bittium spp., Trochiidae, the bivalve Mytilus spp., echinoderms, and others were observed as part of the diet of this particular species.

== Fishery ==
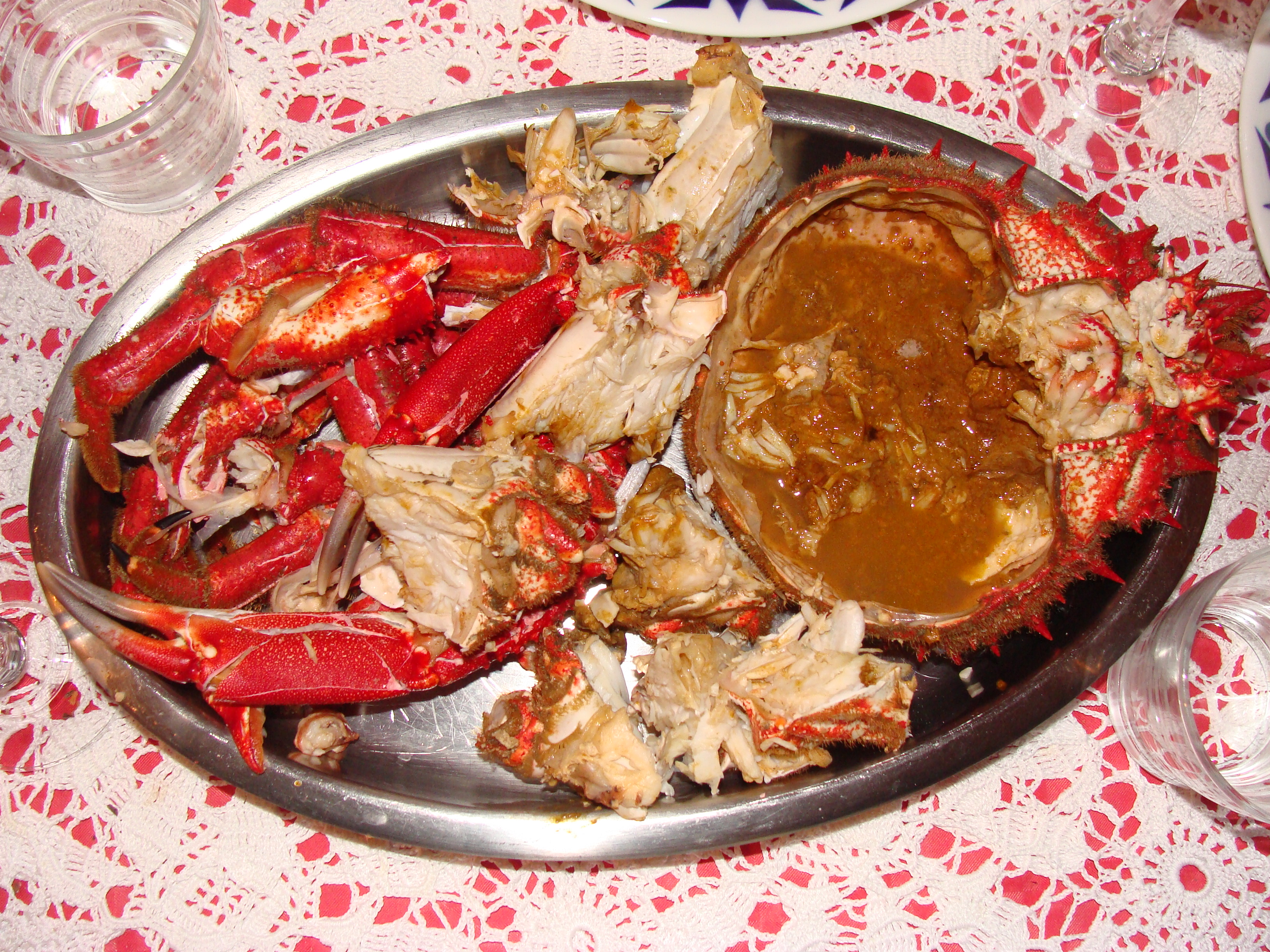
A European spider crab cooked and prepared for consumption

M. squinado is the subject of commercial fishery, with over 5,000 tonnes caught annually. More than 70% off the coast of France, over 10% off the coast of the United Kingdom, 6% from the Channel Islands, 3% from each of Spain and Ireland, 2% from Croatia, 1% from Portugal, and the remainder coming from Montenegro, Denmark, and Morocco, although official production figures are open to doubt. The European Union imposes a minimum landing size of 120 mm for M. squinado, and some individual countries have other regulations, such as a ban on landing egg-bearing females in Spain and a closed season in France and the Channel Islands. However, fisheries can fall due to bad management and environmental degradation. Another notable consideration is that M. squinado is currently endangered, meaning that it is harder for fishermen to catch.

Historic evidence of human consumption of European spider crabs dates to the Middle Pleistocene during the Last Interglacial, where the Neanderthal site at Gruta da Figueira Brava, Portugal, shows evidence of substantial harvesting and consumption of the species.
