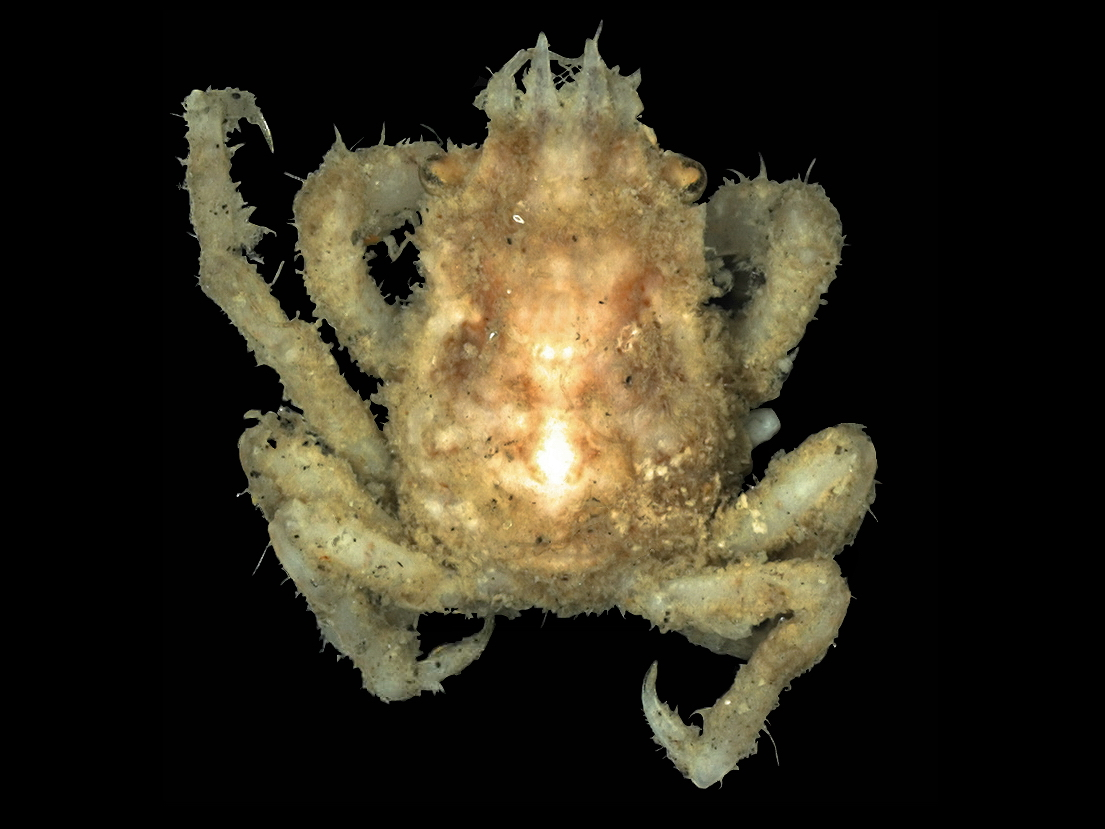
- Eurynoma aspera

Scientific classification
- Kingdom: Animalia
- Phylum: Arthropoda
- Clade: Pancrustacea
- Class: Malacostraca
- Order: Decapoda
- Suborder: Pleocyemata
- Infraorder: Brachyura
- Superfamily: Majoidea
- Family: Majidae; Samouelle, 1819

Subfamilies
- Eurynolambrinae; Majinae; Micromaiinae †; Mithracinae; Planoterginae

= Majidae =

Family of crabs

Majidae is a family of crabs, comprising around 200 marine species inside 52 genera, with a carapace that is longer than it is broad, and which forms a point at the front. The legs can be very long in some species, leading to the name "spider crab". The exoskeleton is covered with bristles to which the crab attaches algae and other items to act as camouflage.

== Genera ==
The roughly 200 extant and over 50 extinct species are divided among 52 genera in 5 subfamilies:

Eurynolambrinae Števčić, 1994

- Eurynolambrus H. Milne-Edwards & Lucas, 1841

Majinae Samouelle, 1819

- Ageitomaia Griffin & Tranter, 1986
- Anacinetops Miers, 1879
- Choniognathus Rathbun, 1932
- Cyclax Dana, 1851
- Entomonyx Miers, 1884
- Eurynome Leach, 1814
- Jacquinotia Rathbun, 1915
- Kasagia Richer de Forges & Ng, 2007
- Kimbla Griffin & Tranter, 1986
- Leptomithrax Miers, 1876
- Maiopsis Faxon, 1893
- Maja Lamarck, 1801
- Majella Ortmann, 1893
- Microhalimus Haswell, 1880
- Naxia Latreille, 1825
- Notomithrax Griffin, 1963
- Paraentomonyx T. Sakai, 1983
- Paramithrax H. Milne-Edwards, 1837
- Pippacirama Griffin & Tranter, 1986
- Prismatopus Ward, 1933
- Schizophroida T. Sakai, 1933
- Schizophrys White, 1848
- Seiitaoides Griffin & Tranter, 1986
- Temnonotus A. Milne-Edwards, 1875
- Teratomaia Griffin & Tranter, 1986
- Thersandrus Rathbun, 1897
- Tumulosternum McCulloch, 1913
- Wilsonimaia † Blow & Manning, 1996

Micromaiinae † Beurlen, 1930

- Micromaia † Bittner, 1875
- Mithracia † Bell, 1858
- Pisomaja † Lőrenthey, in Lőrenthey & Beurlen, 1929

Mithracinae MacLeay, 1838

- Ala Lockington, 1877
- Antarctomithrax † Feldmann, 1994
- Coelocerus A. Milne-Edwards, 1875
- Cyclocoeloma Miers, 1880
- Cyphocarcinus A. Milne-Edwards, 1868
- Leptopisa Stimpson, 1871
- Macrocoeloma Miers, 1879
- Micippa Leach, 1817
- Microphrys Milne-Edwards, 1851
- Mithraculus White, 1847
- Mithrax A. G. Desmarest, 1823
- Nemausa A. Milne-Edwards, 1875
- Paranaxia Rathbun, 1924
- Picroceroides Miers, 1886
- Stenocionops A. G. Desmarest, 1823
- Teleophrys Stimpson, 1860
- Thoe Bell, 1836
- Tiarinia Dana, 1851

Planoterginae Števčić, 1991

- Hemus A. Milne-Edwards, 1875
- Planotergum Balss, 1935
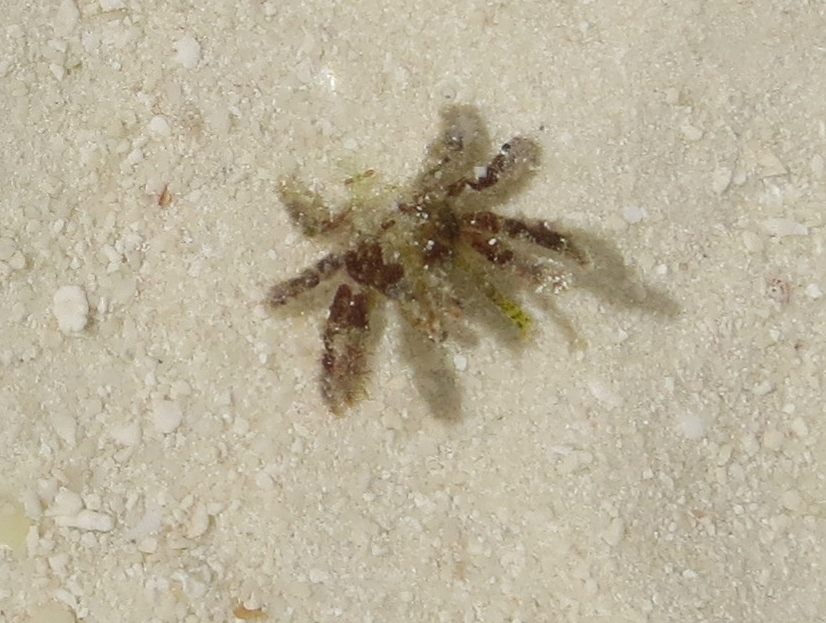
Cyclocoeloma cf. tuberculata

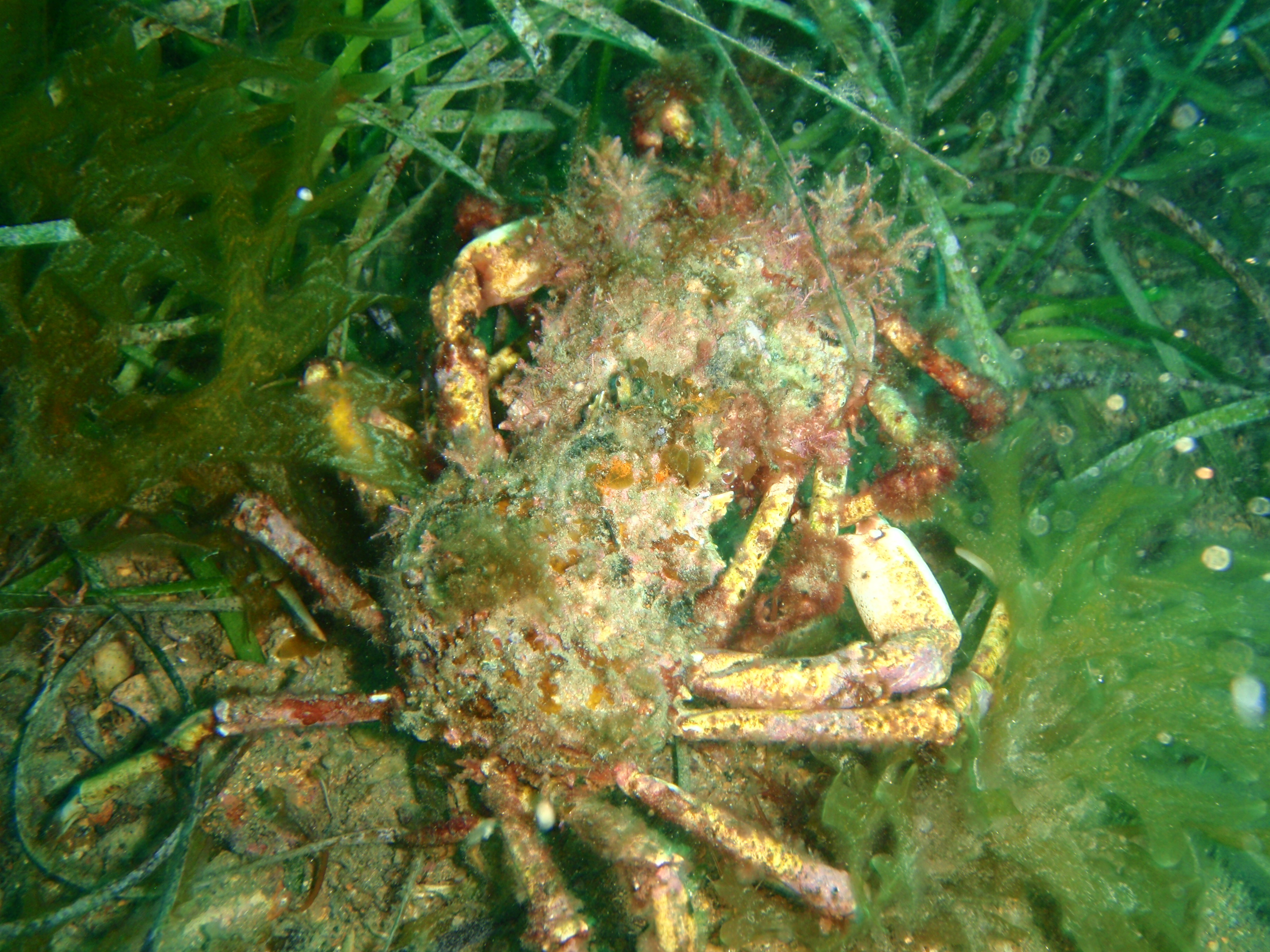
Leptomithrax gaimardii

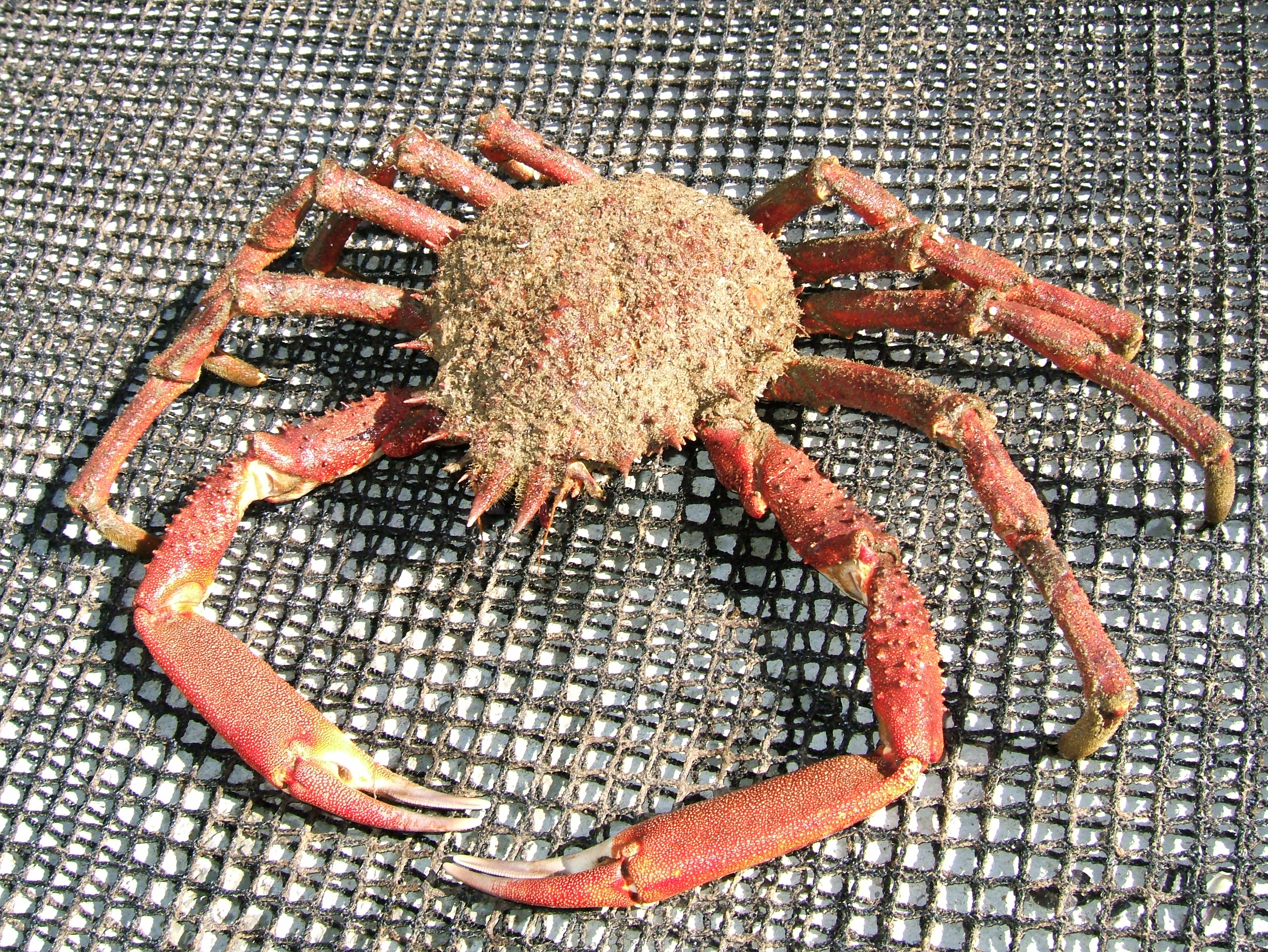
Maja squinado

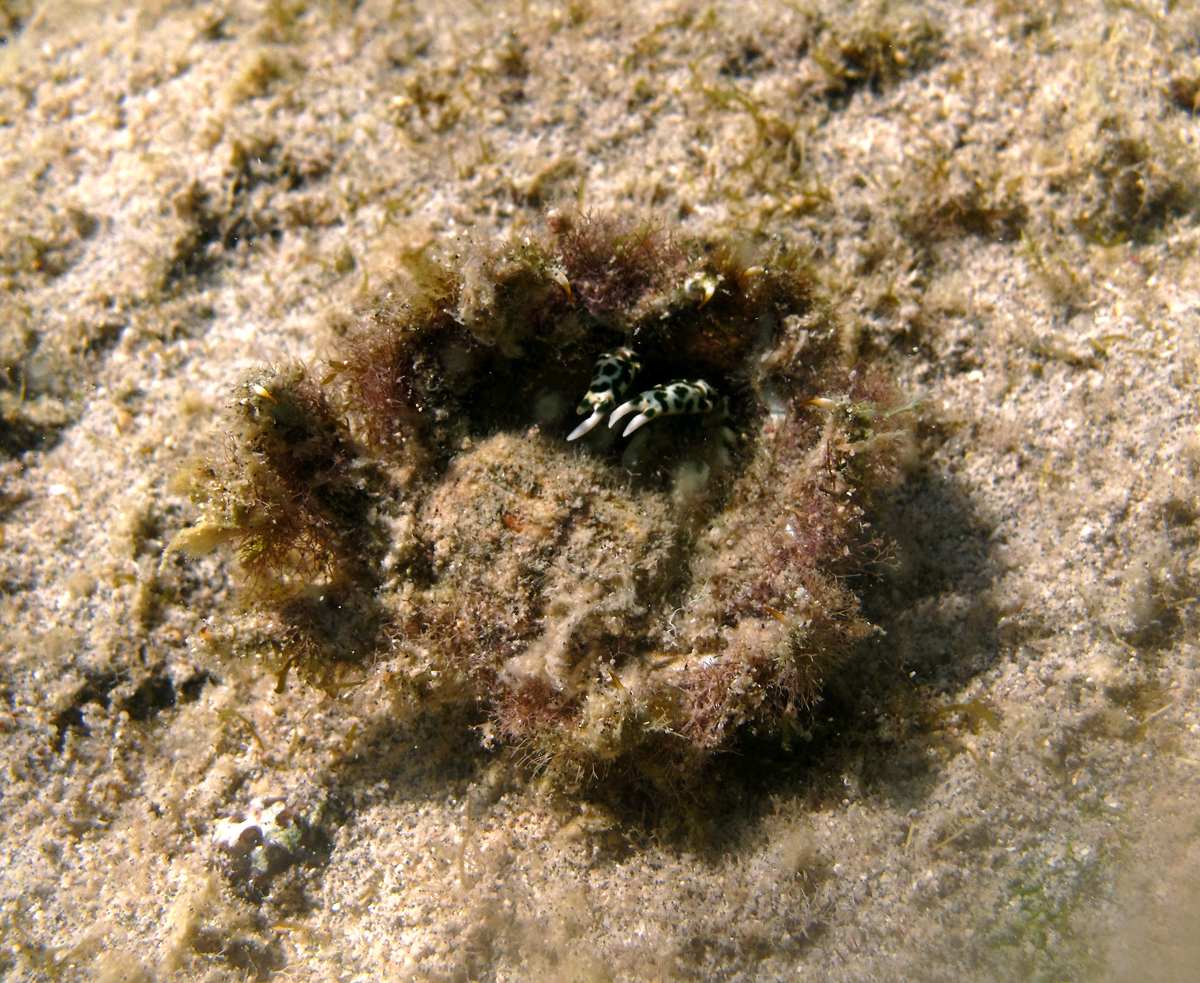
Micippa platipes (on its back)

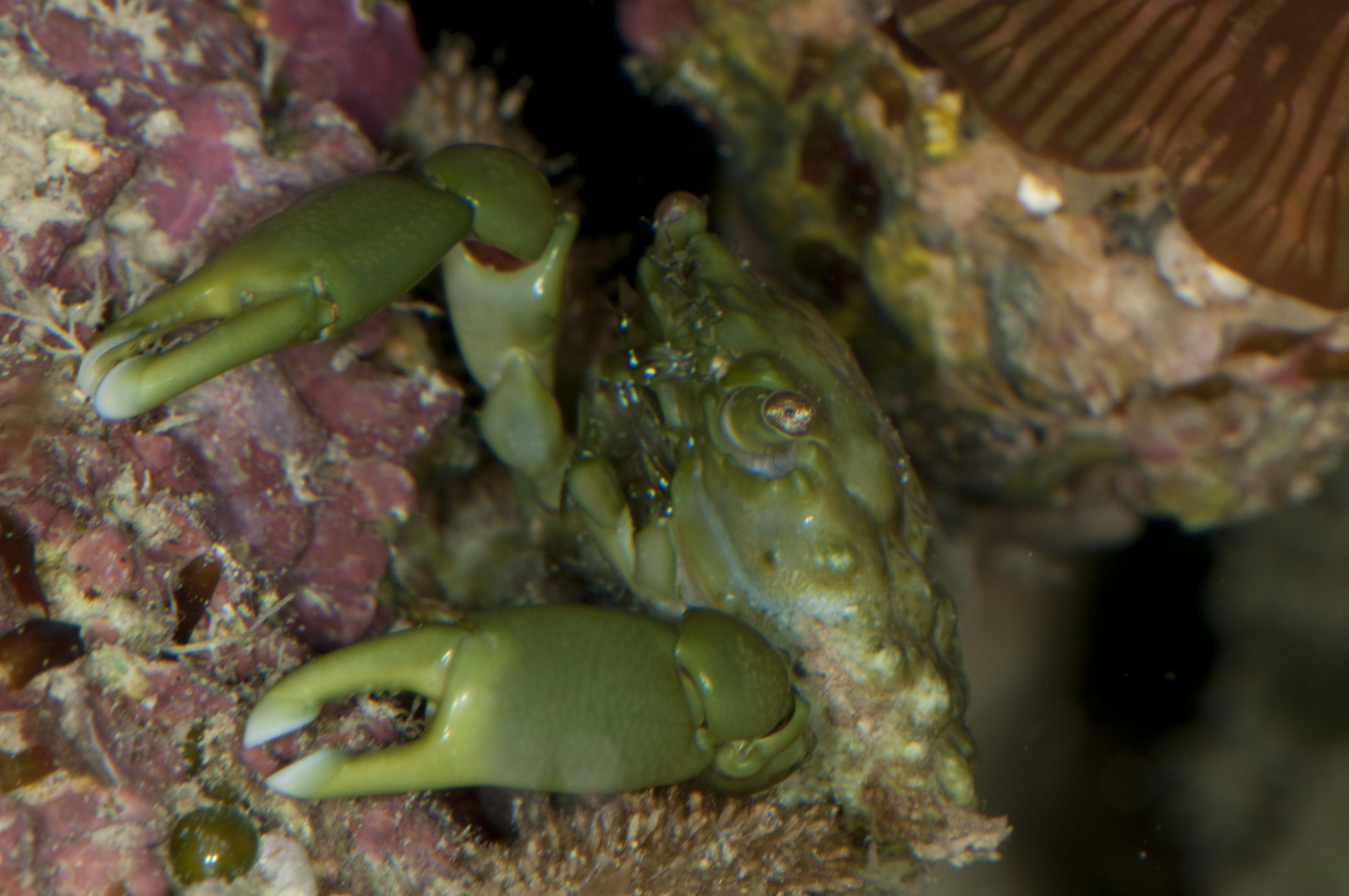
Mithraculus sculptus

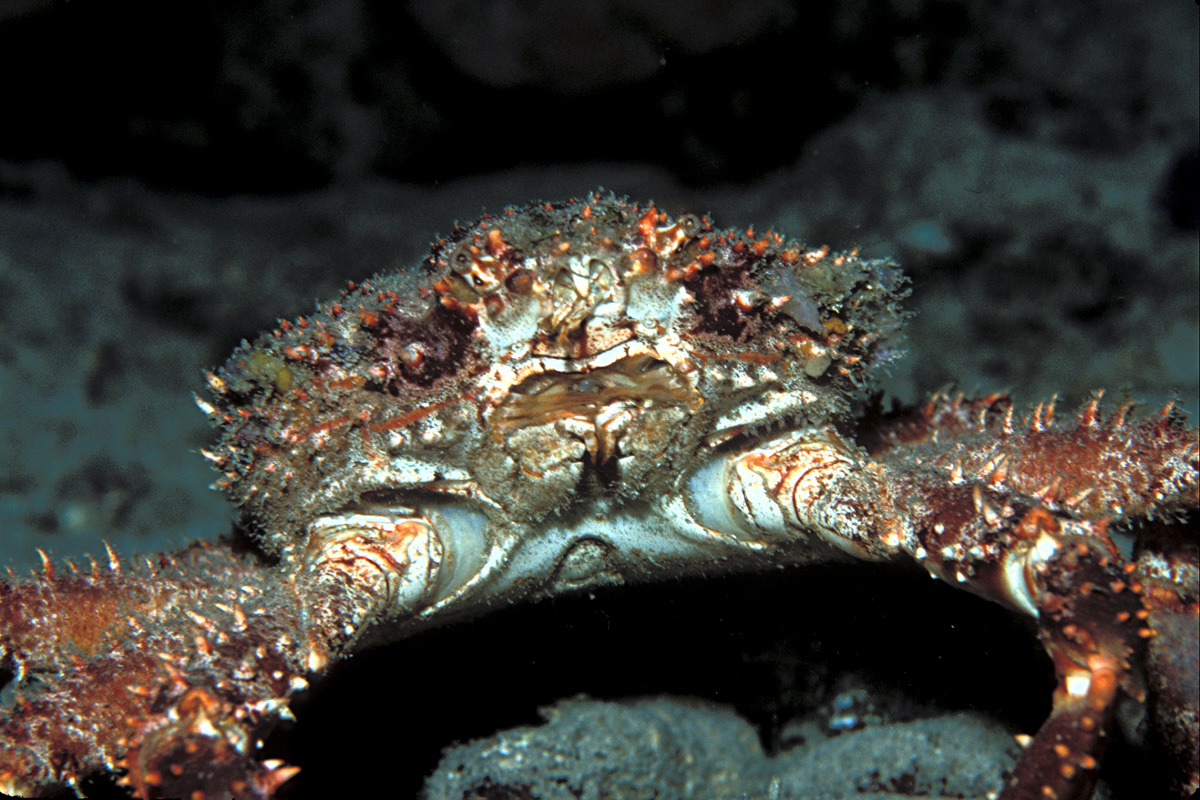
Mithrax pilosus
