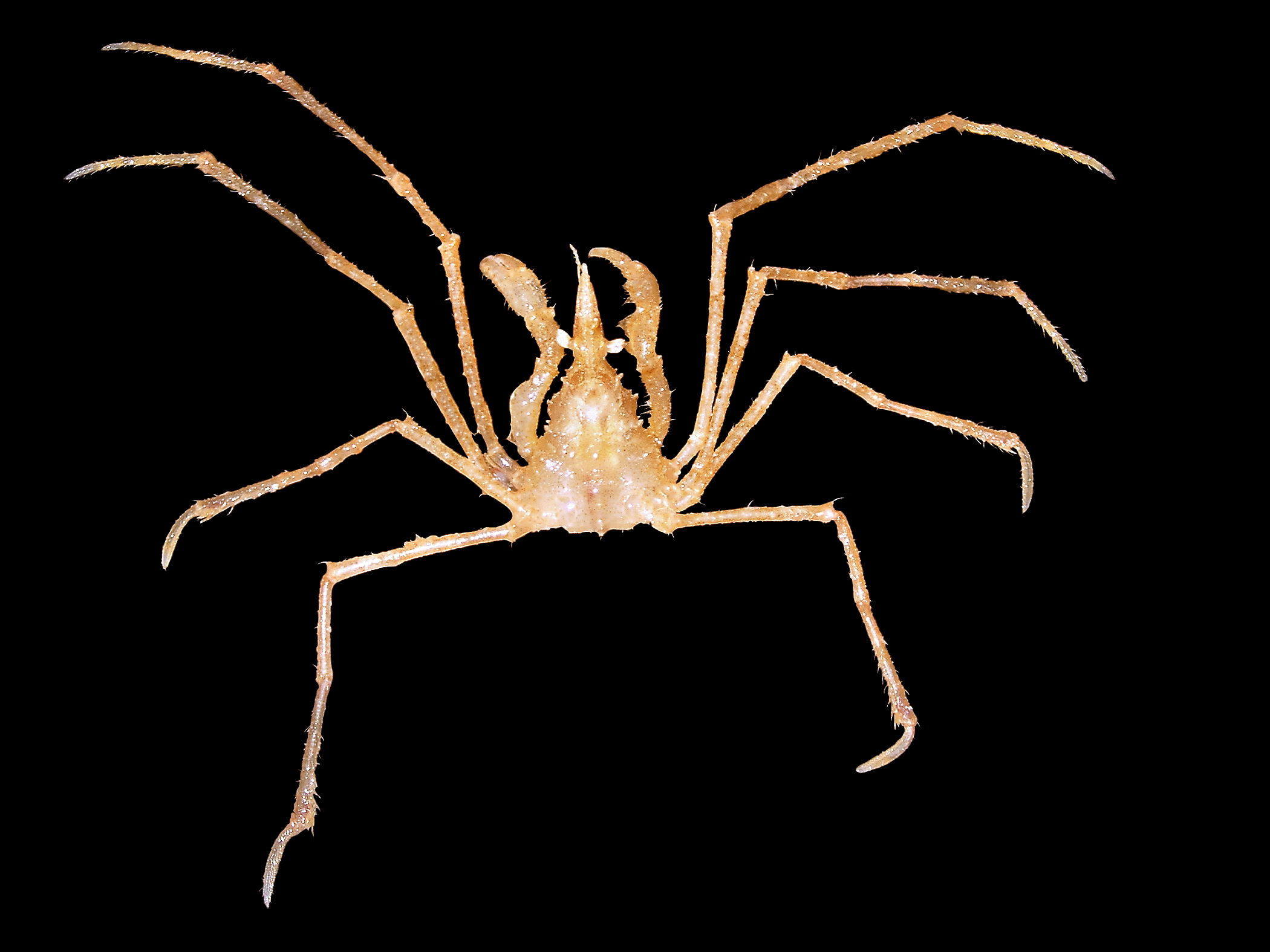

Scientific classification
- Kingdom: Animalia
- Phylum: Arthropoda
- Clade: Pancrustacea
- Class: Malacostraca
- Order: Decapoda
- Suborder: Pleocyemata
- Infraorder: Brachyura
- Family: Inachidae
- Genus: Macropodia
- Species: M. rostrata

Binomial name
- Macropodia rostrata (Linnaeus, 1761)

Synonyms
- Cancer rostrata Linnaeus, 1761; Cancer rostratus Linnaeus 1761 (basionym); Stenorhynchus rostratus (Linnaeus, 1761); Stenorhynchus rostratus var. spinulosum Miers, 1881

= Macropodia rostrata =

Species of crab

Macropodia rostrata, common names, the common spider crab, long-legged spider crab, long-legged crab, is a species of marine crab in the family Inachidae. The Macropodia Rostrata visually mimics many other types of small crabs with the exception of its long legs. By attaching algae to their thin legs, they can be confused with the stem of seaweed. This is both a defense mechanism and a predatory advantage, as unsuspecting fish will hide in seaweed beds from nearby predators. This behavior can be absent among larger crabs, and those that live at great depths like giant Japanese spider crabs.

== Description ==
Macropodia rostrata has a hairy, or fuzzy appearance due to algae it applies to itself for camouflage. Both the carapace and pereiopods of this species are greyish to yellowish or reddish-brown in colour, with some specimens showing white markings. The carapace grows to a maximum length of 16 (28) mm, with the anterior part is narrowing, giving it a pear shape. The length of the carapace is measuredon the median line, from the anterior to the posterior margin. The surface of the carapace surface contains numerous hook-setae. From a dorsal view, the eye-stalks are completely visible. Macropodia rostrata use their eyes as well as other sensory organs to locate and catch prey. Spider crabs are omnivorous and most are underwater scavengers, and will eat anything from algae to mollusks and small fish. Decorator crabs such as the Macropodia rostrata will use the algae covering their limbs as camouflage and an emergency food source.

== Distribution and ecology ==
Macropodia rostrata is found along the coasts of Europe and western Africa, from 65° N in Norway to South Africa, including the Mediterranean Sea and parts of the Black Sea. Unlike giant Japanese Spider crabs, you will not find Macropodia rostrata on the bottom of the ocean. It occurs chiefly at depths of 0–50 metres (0–164 ft), although it can occasionally be found at up to 150 m (490 ft). It is commonly found in muddy sand, and on kelp. Macropodia rostrata can apply algae to its body to camouflage itself. It is easily preyed upon as it is slow moving. When startled, spider crabs will wave their pincers over their heads, which is their main defense against predators such as gulls and shorebirds. Although not common, large fish and sharks will prey on spider crabs, but are often dissuaded due to their hard shells.

== Reproduction ==
Although it cannot be genetically determined what dictates minimum and maximum post-puberty sizes of Macropodia rostrata, scientists believe it is the result of varied ecological histories. Interestingly, it was expected that the males of the species Macropodia rostrata would show modification of the genital papillae and the first intromittent organs coinciding with the molt of puberty, however it was observed that the size of carapace length and genital papillae did not correlate. For male Macropodia rostrata, the largest pre-puberty carapace lengths are 18mm, while the mean is generally 16.4mm. Male Macropodia rostrata can reach a maximum post-puberty carapace length of 23mm. Females of the same species are generally smaller, and reach a maximum post puberty carapace length of 20mm. The largest pre-puberty length a female can reach is about 14 mm, while the average length after puberty is 14.4mm. As macropodia mature sexually, several interesting physiological changes occur. In males sexual maturity is indicated by the swelling and color change of their sperm ducts. This is caused by the production of sperm that is enclosed within spermatophores and gives the ducts a white appearance. In females of the species, change in shape and diameter of ovaries indicates sexual maturity. For both males and females of the species, the “moult of puberty” is required to reproduce, as females do not ovulate before then and males do not produce sperm. Macropodia rostrata can then copulate at any time after the “moult of puberty”. After copulation, sperm are stored in a spermathecae and the females can use this for several ovulations. Macropodia rostrata produce eggs around the size of 0.6mm, and several factors influence how many they can produce. Macropodia rostrata are continuous breeders, and do not have mating seasons.

== Taxonomy ==
M. rostrata was first described by Carl Linnaeus in his 1761 work Fauna Suecica, under the name Cancer rostratus.
