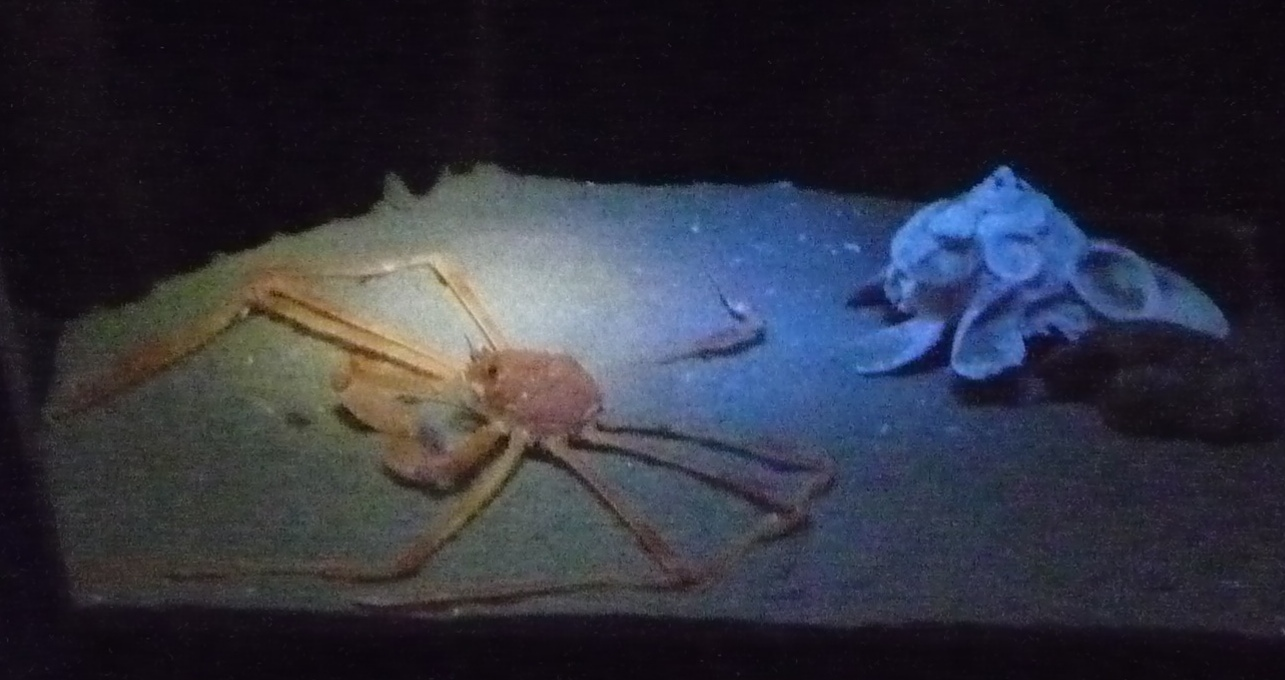

Scientific classification
- Kingdom: Animalia
- Phylum: Arthropoda
- Clade: Pancrustacea
- Class: Malacostraca
- Order: Decapoda
- Suborder: Pleocyemata
- Infraorder: Brachyura
- Family: Inachidae
- Genus: Platymaia
- Species: P. alcocki

Binomial name
- Platymaia alcocki Rathbun, 1918

= Platymaia alcocki =

Species of crab

Platymaia alcocki is a species of crab in the family Inachidae.

== Distribution ==
It is found between the depths of 208 to 632.5 meters deep, and near Madagascar and the Philippines. It has been found in deep-water environments off the cost of Thailand and in the Indian Ocean
