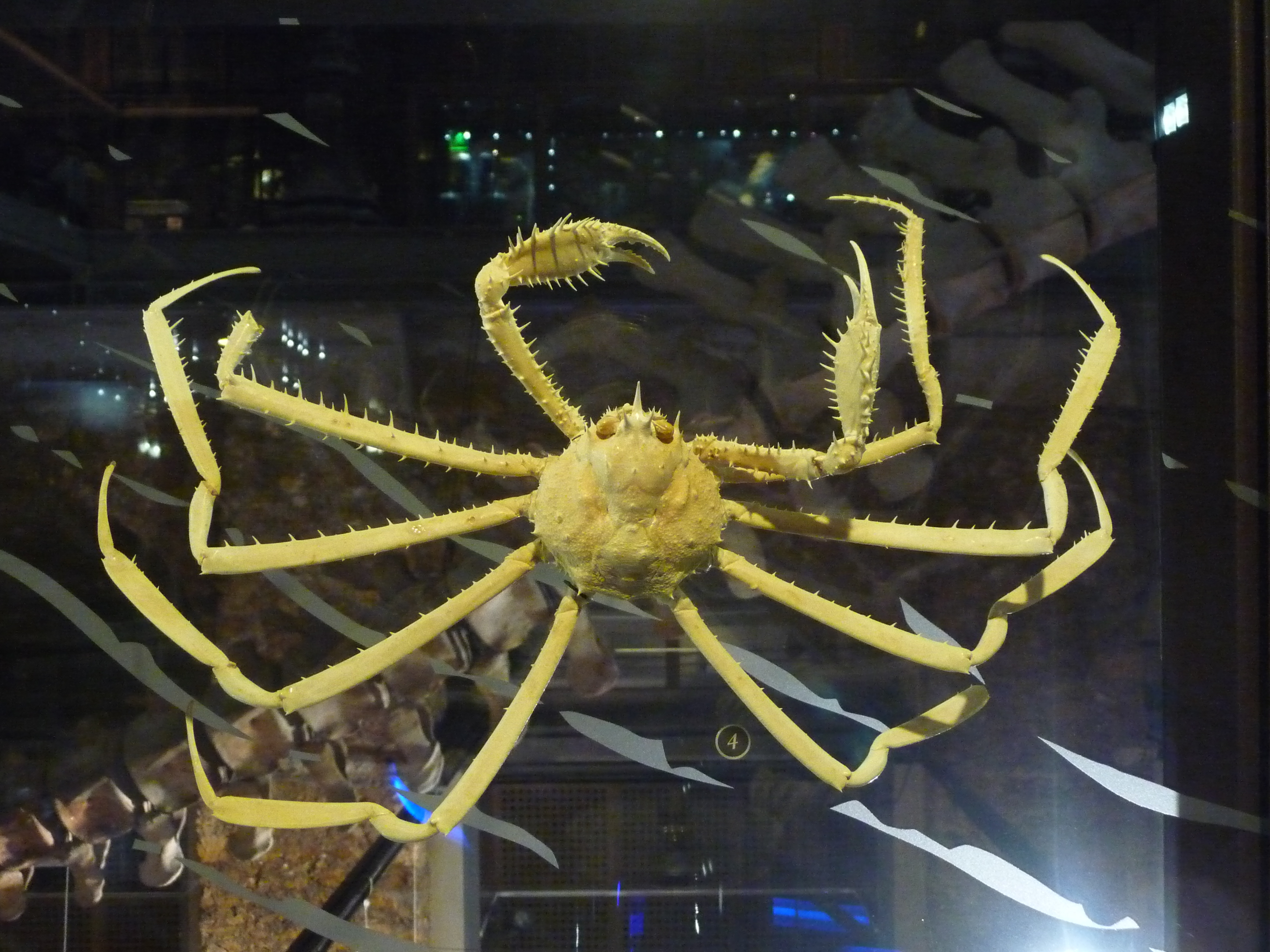
- Platymaia rebierei

Scientific classification
- Kingdom: Animalia
- Phylum: Arthropoda
- Clade: Pancrustacea
- Class: Malacostraca
- Order: Decapoda
- Suborder: Pleocyemata
- Infraorder: Brachyura
- Family: Inachidae
- Genus: Platymaia; Miers, 1886

= Platymaia =

Genus of crabs

Platymaia is a genus of crab in the family Inachidae, containing the following species:

- Platymaia alcocki Rathbun, 1918
- Platymaia bartschi Rathbun, 1916
- Platymaia fimbriata Rathbun, 1916
- Platymaia longimana Macpherson, 1984
- Platymaia maoria Dell, 1963
- Platymaia mindirra Griffin & Tranter, 1986
- Platymaia rebierei Guinot & Richer de Forges, 1986
- Platymaia remifera Rathbun, 1916
- Platymaia turbynei Stebbing, 1902
- Platymaia wyvillethomsoni Miers, 1886
