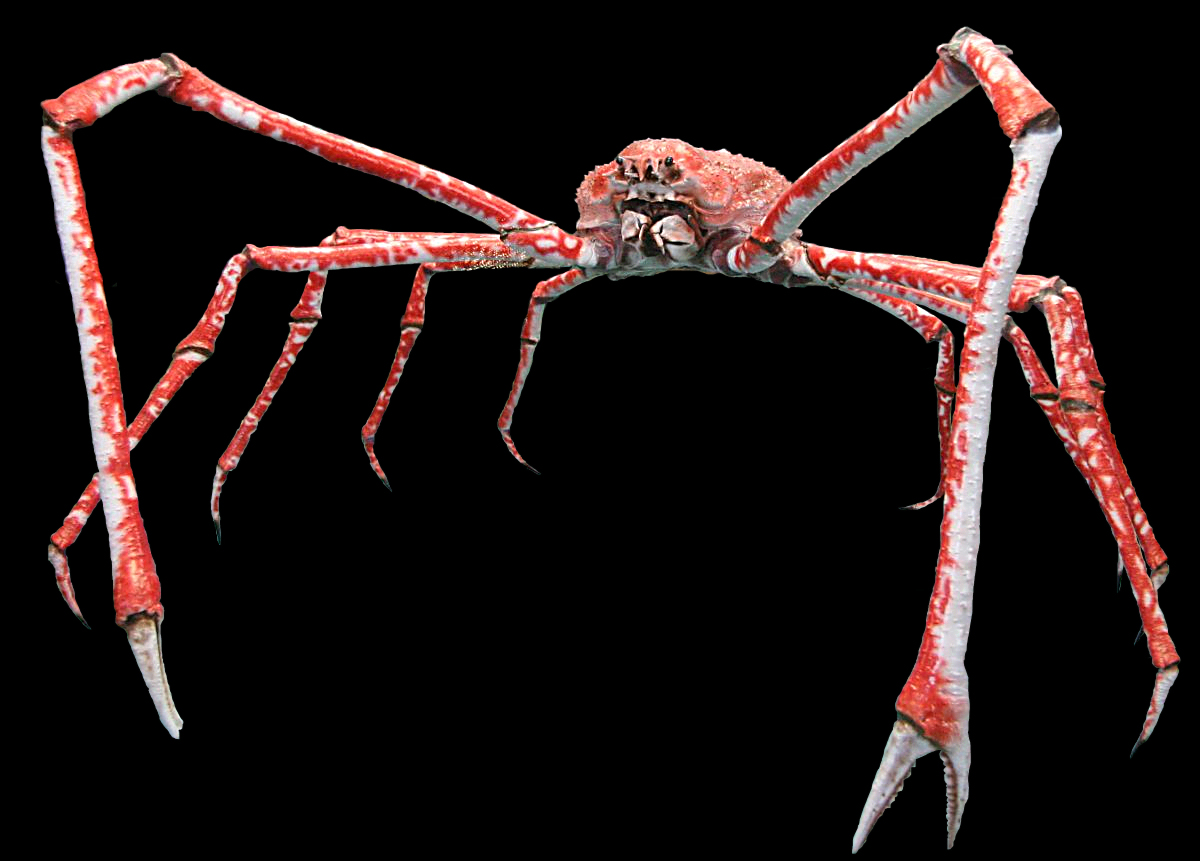

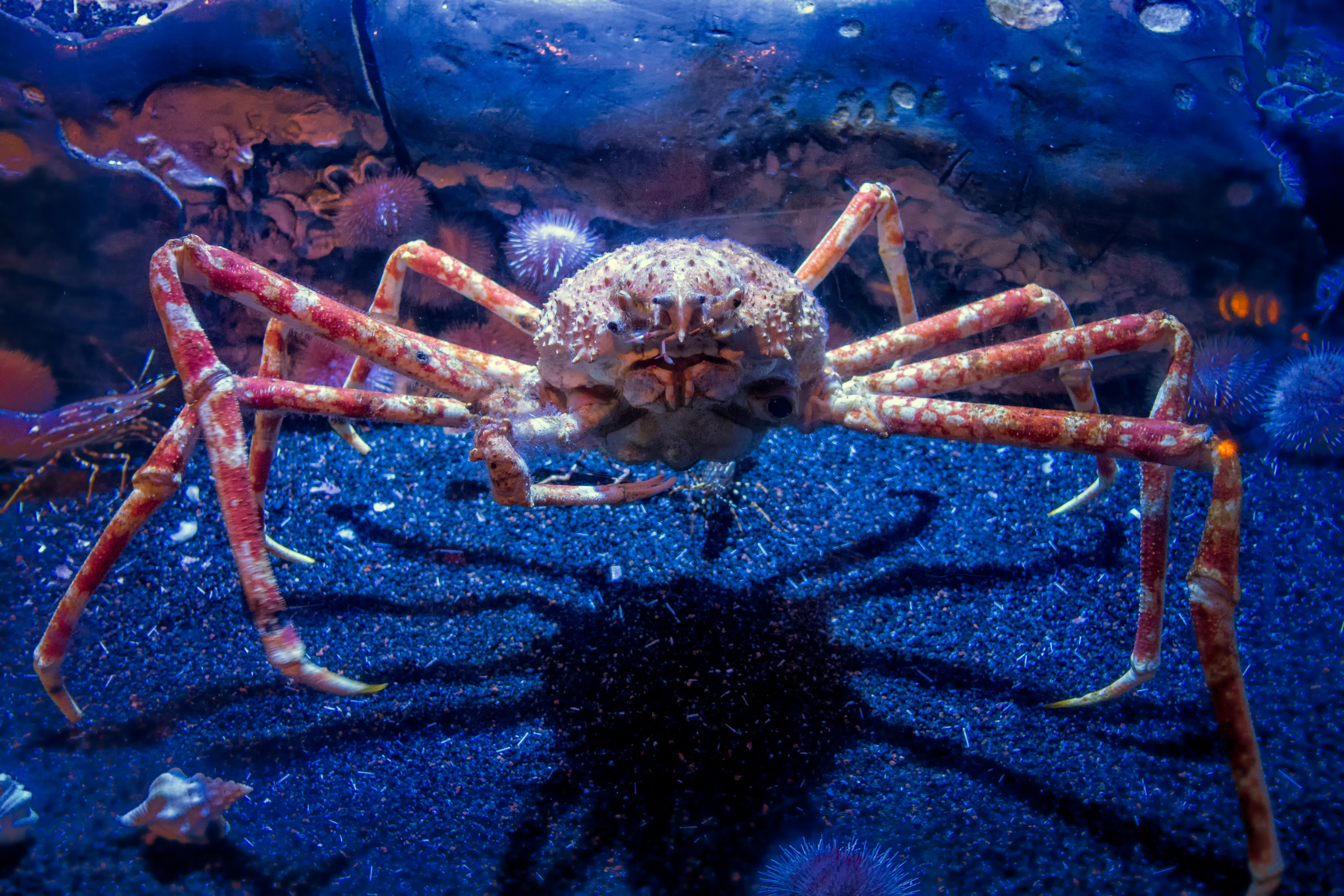

Scientific classification
- Kingdom: Animalia
- Phylum: Arthropoda
- Clade: Pancrustacea
- Class: Malacostraca
- Order: Decapoda
- Suborder: Pleocyemata
- Infraorder: Brachyura
- Family: Macrocheiridae
- Genus: Macrocheira
- Species: M. kaempferi

Binomial name
- Macrocheira kaempferi (Temminck, 1836)

Synonyms
- Maja kaempferi Temminck, 1836; Inachus kaempferi (Temminck, 1836); Kaempferia kaempferi (Temminck, 1836)

= Japanese spider crab =

Species of crab

The Japanese giant spider crab (Macrocheira kaempferi) is a species of marine crab and is the largest crab found in the waters around Japan. At around 3.75 metres (12.3 ft), it has the largest leg-span of any arthropod. The Japanese name for this species is taka-ashi-gani, (Japanese: 高脚蟹; タカアシガニ), literally translating to "tall-legged crab". It goes through three main larval stages along with a prezoeal stage to grow to its full size.

The Japanese giant spider crab is the sole living member of the genus Macrocheira. Three fossil species of this genus are known: M. ginzanensis and M. yabei from the Miocene of Japan, and M. teglandi from the Oligocene. They are sought by crab fisheries, and are considered a delicacy in Japan. To prevent overexploitation from harming the species, conservation efforts have been put in place to protect them and their population from overfishing.

The Japanese giant spider crab is similar in appearance to the much smaller European spider crab (Maja squinado), though the latter, while within the same superfamily, belongs to a different family: the Majidae.

== Description ==
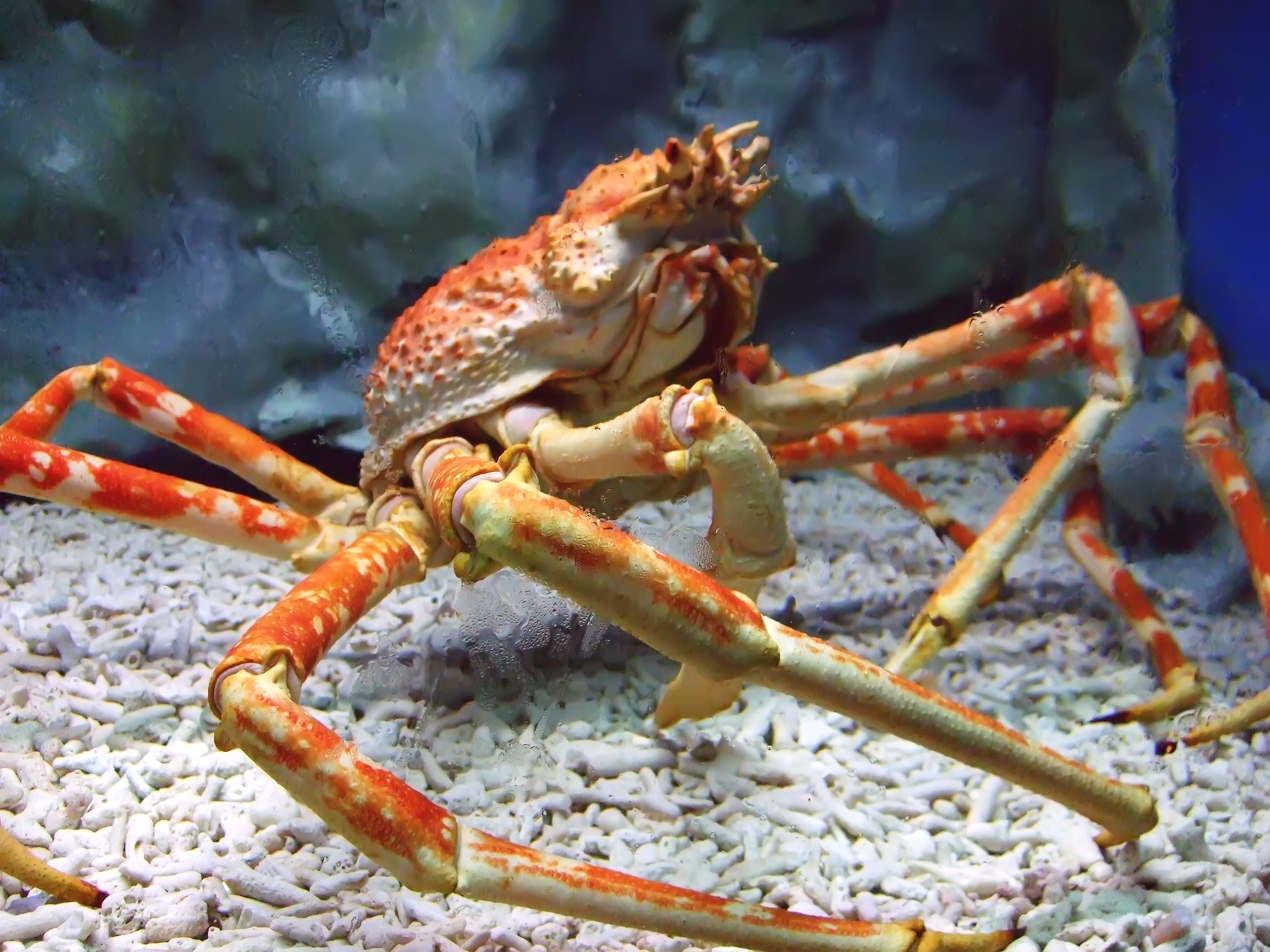
A Japanese spider crab at the Manila Ocean Park, the Philippines

The Japanese spider crab has the greatest leg span of any known arthropod, reaching up to 3.7 m (12.1 ft) from claw to claw. The body may grow to 40 cm (16 in) in carapace width and the whole crab can weigh up to 19 kg (42 lb)—second in mass only to the American lobster among all living arthropod species. The males have longer chelipeds; females have much shorter chelipeds, which are shorter than the following pair of legs.

Apart from its large size, the Japanese spider crab differs from other crabs in a number of ways. The first pleopods of males are unusually twisted, and the larvae appear primitive. The crab is orange with white spots along the legs. It is reported to have a gentle disposition despite its ferocious appearance. The Japanese spider crab also has a unique molting behavior that occurs for about 100 minutes, in which the crab loses its mobility, starts molting its carapace rear, and ends with molting its walking legs.

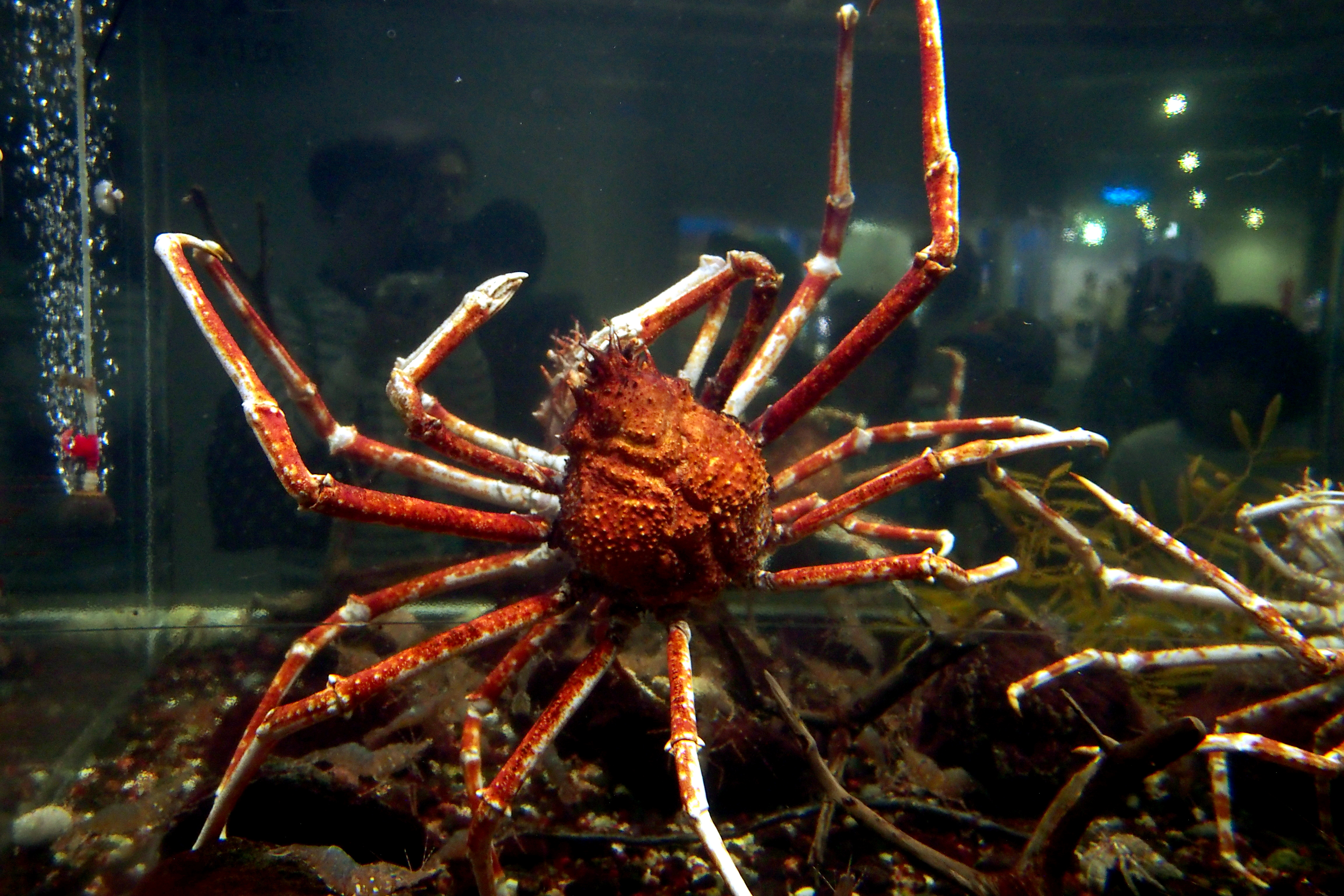
At Sunpiazza Aquarium in Sapporo, Japan

The Japanese spider crab has an armored exoskeleton that helps protect it from larger predators such as octopuses, but also uses camouflage. The crab's bumpy carapace blends into the rocky ocean floor. To further the deception, a spider crab adorns its shell with sponges and other animals. A spider crab is able to pick up and cover itself with such organisms by following a specific routine behavior. Upon picking up the object with the crab's slender chelipeds, the chelae are used to twist and tear off the organism, such as a worm tube or sponge, from the substrate on which it currently resides. Once the material is picked up, it is brought to the crab's mouthparts to orient and shape it before it is attached to the exoskeleton. Then, through mechanical adhesion and secretions, the materials attach to the crab, and are able to regenerate and colonize on the crab.

Unlike other species of crab, such as the Chilean crab Acanthonyx petiveri, the Japanese spider crab does not specifically look for matching colors to blend into its environment; it simply camouflages in a way that disguises its entire structure. This is most likely because Japanese spider crabs are nocturnally active, so instead of trying to disguise themselves when catching prey, they aim to avoid predators at night.

== Distribution and habitat ==
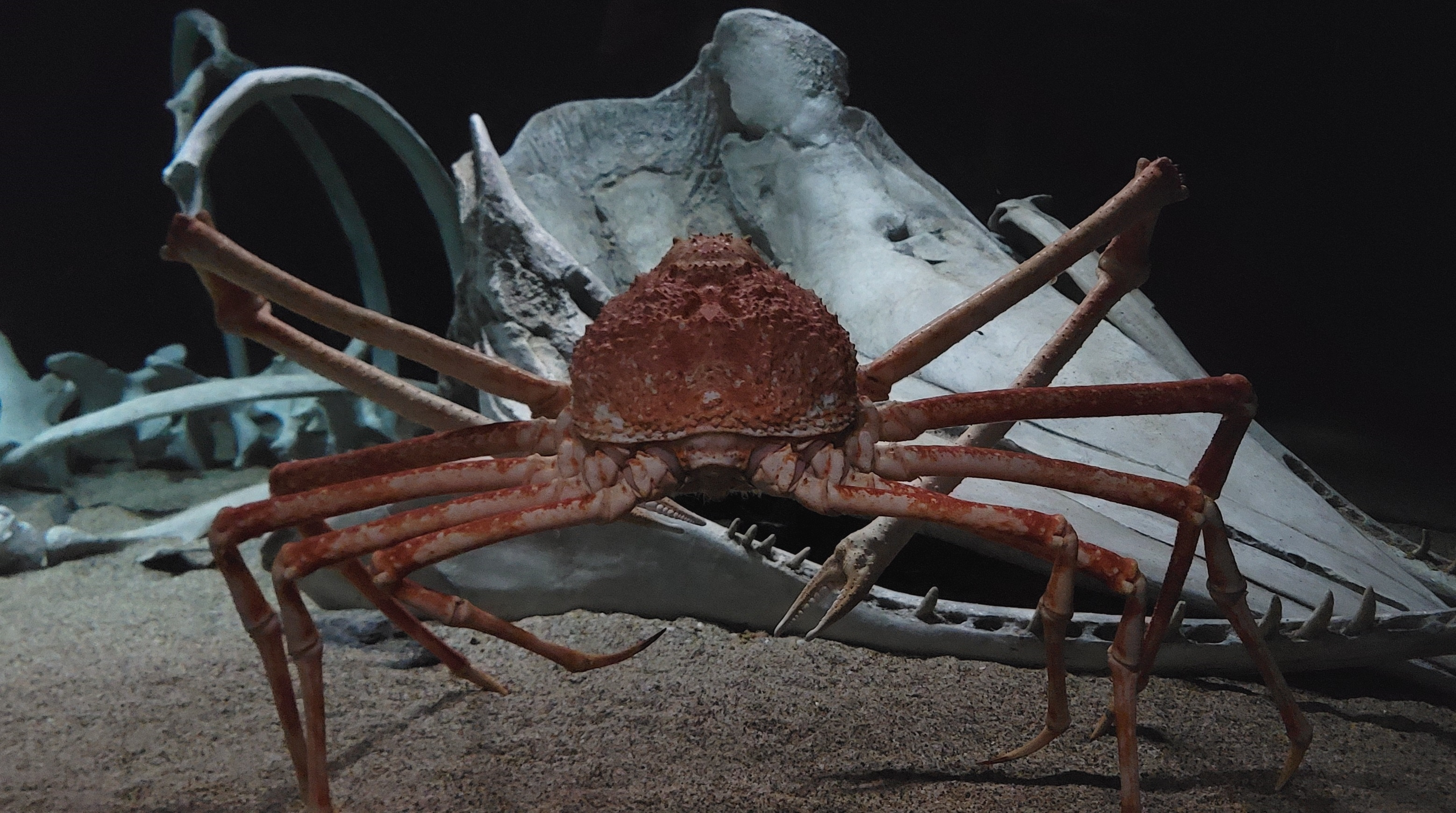
Rear view of a Japanese spider crab at Monterey Bay Aquarium

Japanese spider crabs are mostly found off the southern coasts of the Japanese island of Honshū, from Tokyo Bay to Kagoshima Prefecture. Outlying populations have been found in Iwate Prefecture and off Su-ao in Taiwan. Adults are found at depths between 50 and 600 m (160 and 1,970 ft). They like to inhabit vents and holes in the deeper parts of the ocean. The temperature preference of adults is unknown, but the species is regular at a depth of 300 metres (980 ft) in Suruga Bay, where the water generally is about 10 °C (50 °F). Based on results from public aquaria, Japanese spider crabs tolerate temperatures between 6 and 16 °C (43 and 61 °F), but are typically maintained at 10–13 °C (50–55 °F).

The Japanese spider crab is an omnivore, consuming both plant-matter and animals. It also sometimes acts as a scavenger, consuming dead/decaying fish. Some have been known to scrape the ocean floor for living plants and algae (such as kelp), while others pry open the shells of mollusks and small marine invertebrates.

== Lifecycle ==
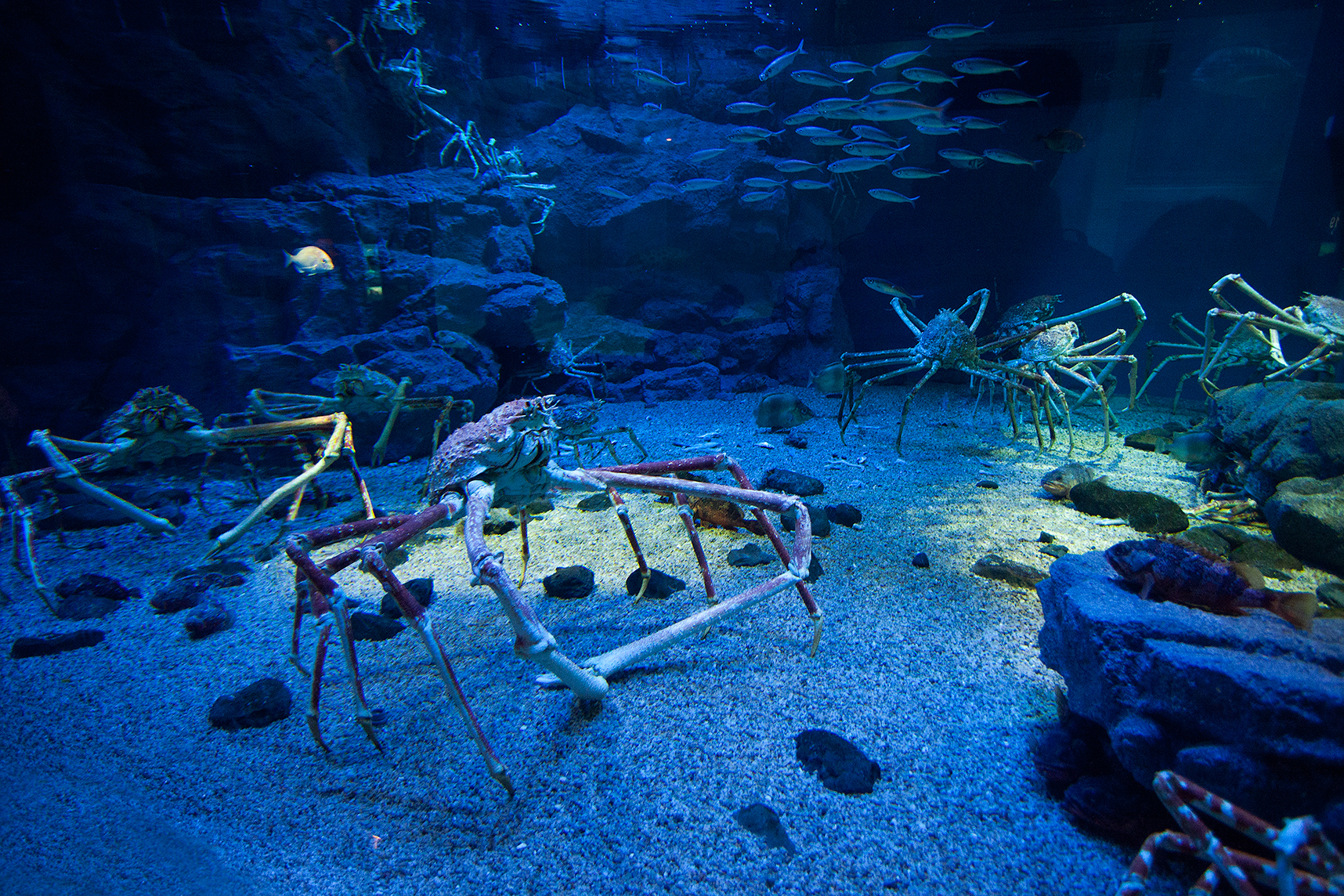
Japanese spider crabs at Osaka Aquarium Kaiyukan, Japan

Female crabs carry the fertilized eggs attached to their abdominal appendages until they hatch into tiny planktonic larvae. They can lay up to 1.5 million eggs per season, and these eggs hatch in 10 days on average. Once hatched, these larvae undergo four stages of development before they mature into adulthood.

The first, or prezoeal, stage lasts only a matter of minutes, with most molting within 15 minutes to enter the first zoeal stage. Prezoeal crabs have a small, transparent body.

A Japanese spider crab at Shedd Aquarium, Chicago, US

M. kaempferi undergoes two zoeal stages and a megalopa stage before it reaches adulthood. Each of these stages is influenced greatly by temperature, both in terms of survival and stage length. The optimum rearing temperature for all larval stages is thought to be between 15 and 18 °C, with survival temperatures ranging from 11 to 20 °C (52 to 68 °F). At these temperatures, the zoeal stages can last 7 to 18 days, with the megalopa stage lasting 25 to 45 days. Colder water is associated with longer durations in each stage.

During the larval stages, M. kaempferi is found near the surface, as the planktonic forms drift with ocean currents. This surface water ranges between 12 and 15 °C during the hatching season (January to March). This is much warmer than the waters at depths below 200 m (656 ft), where adults are found, with waters steadily around 10 °C (50 °F). Optimal temperatures have a 70% survival through the first zoeal stage, which is greatly reduced to a 30% survival in the second zoeal and megalopa stages.

== Taxonomic history ==
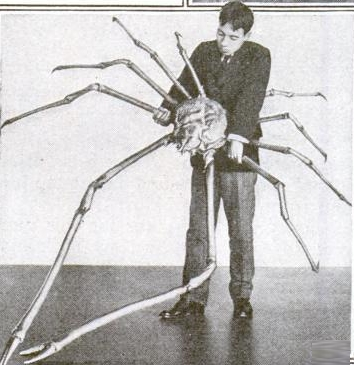
This crab specimen from the American Museum of Natural History measures 3.8 metres (12 ft) across its outstretched legs.

The Japanese spider crab was originally described by Western science in 1836 by Coenraad Jacob Temminck under the name Maja kaempferi, based on material from Philipp Franz von Siebold collected near the artificial island Dejima. The specific epithet commemorates Engelbert Kaempfer, a German naturalist who lived in Japan from 1690 to 1692 and wrote about the country's natural history. It was moved to the genus Inachus by Wilhem de Haan in 1839, but placed in a new subgenus, Macrocheira. That subgenus was raised to the rank of the genus in 1886 by Edward J. Miers. Placed in the family Inachidae, M. kaempferi does not fit cleanly into that group, and it may be necessary to erect a new family just for the genus Macrocheira. Four species of the genus Macrocheira are known from fossils:

- Macrocheira sp. – Pliocene Takanabe Formation, Japan
- M. ginzanensis – Miocene Ginzan Formation, Japan
- M. yabei – Miocene Yonekawa Formation, Japan
- M. teglandi – Oligocene, east of Twin River, Washington, United States

However, some evidence indicates that the genus Macrocheira does come from this family in some way due to its anatomical arrangements. This genus is similar in anatomical arrangement to the genus Oncinopus, seeming to preserve the earliest stage of anatomical evolution in the family Inachidae. The genus Onicinopus has a semi-hardened body, which allows the basal segment of the antennae, which articulates with the head capsule, to move. The antennulae which are segmented appendages between and below the eye stalks are connected. Like Oncinopus, the genus Macrocheira also has a seven-segmented abdomen and a basal segment of antennae that is mobile. Macrocheira also has orbital parts, the eye socket and features around it, that are similar to differentiated genera. Another differentiating feature is the supraorbital eave. It is part of the orbital region above the eyestalks. It projects laterally and becomes part of the spine. From the anatomical observations of this genus and others in the family Inachidae, Macrochiera was placed in the family Inachidae, descending from the genus Oncinpus and from it descending the genera Oreconia, Parapleisticantha, and Pleistincantha.

== Anatomy ==
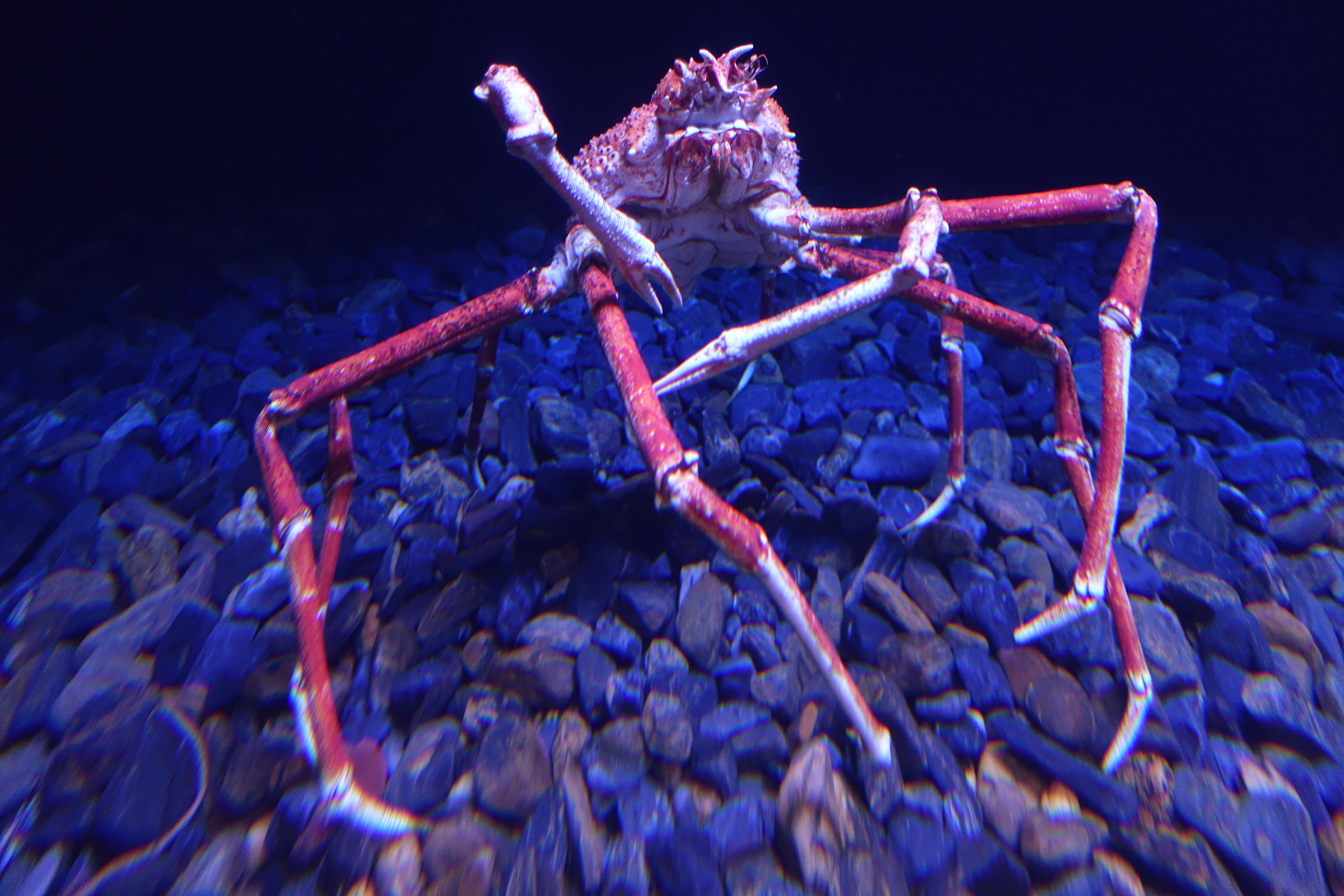
In the Lisbon Oceanarium, Portugal

M. kaempferi is a giant crab with a pear-shaped carapace that is 350 mm (13.7 in) when measured on the median line. Its surface is covered in small spike-like projections or tubercles. The spine of an adult giant crab is short and curves outward at the tip. The spines in young giant crabs, though, are long compared to their carapaces, along with an uncurved spine. It has been discovered that as the crab matures, the carapaces remain the same size, however its legs will continue to grow past maturity. This proportionality explains, as in other decapod crustaceans, that spine size decreases as specimens grow older. As mentioned in the taxonomic section, this genus contains the family's primitive feature of a movable antenna at the basal segment, but "the development of a spine at the posterior angle of the supraocular eave, and the presence of intercalated spine and antennulary septum seem to attribute a rather high position to this genus." Lastly, differences are seen between the sexes. Adult males have very long front legs where the claws are located, but they are still shorter than the ambulatory legs of females, located in the back of the carapace.

== Fishery and conservation ==
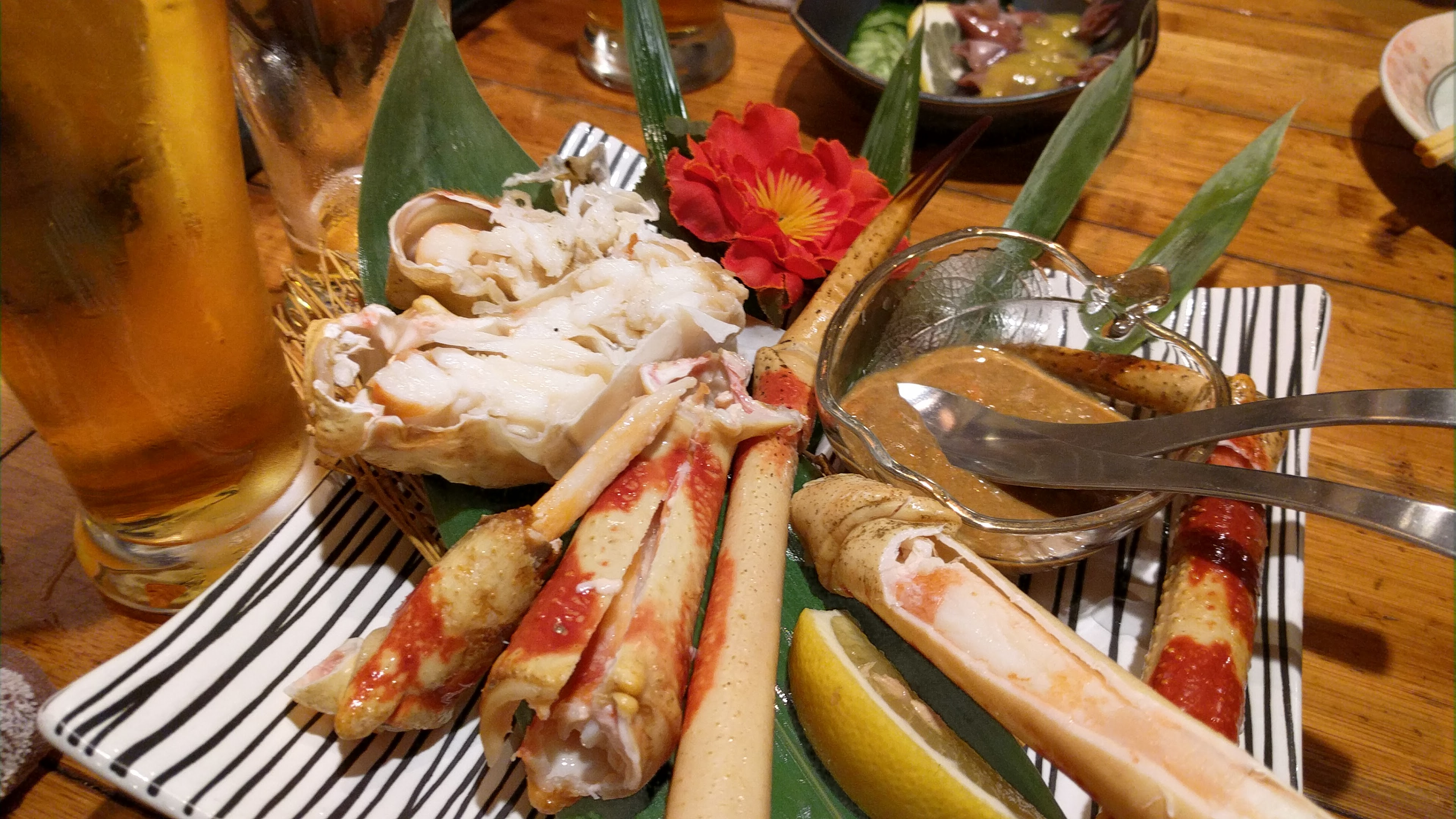
Boiled Japanese spider crab legs in Japan

Temminck, in his original description, noted that the crab was known to the Japanese for the serious injuries it can cause with its strong claws. The Japanese spider crab is "occasionally collected for food", and even considered a delicacy in many parts of Japan and other areas in the region. In total, 24.7 tonnes (54,000 lb) were collected in 1976, but fell to only 3.2 tonnes (7,100 lb) in 1985. The fishery is centred on Suruga Bay. The crabs are typically caught using small trawling nets. The population has decreased in number due to overfishing, forcing fishermen into exploring deeper waters to catch them. The average size caught by fishermen is a legspan of 1.0–1.2 m (3 ft 3 in – 3 ft 11 in). Populations of this species of crab have diminished over recent years and many efforts are being made to protect them. One of the primary methods of recovery of the species being used is restocking artificially cultured juvenile crabs in fisheries. Additionally, laws have been put into place in Japan that prohibit fishermen from harvesting spider crabs from January through April, during their typical mating season when they are in shallower waters and more vulnerable to being caught. This protection method seeks to keep natural populations growing, and enables time for juvenile spider crabs to go through the early stages of their lifecycle.

== Popular culture ==
The spider crab's scientific name, Macrocheira kaempferi, inspired the Macra, a race of giant crab-like aliens from the Doctor Who stories The Macra Terror and "Gridlock".

== See also ==
- Largest arthropods
- King crab
- Red king crab
