= Inachus (disambiguation) =

Inachus or Inachos (Greek: Ίναχος) is:

- Inachos, a former municipality in Greece, Aetolia-Acarnania Regional Unit
- Inachos, a village in Greece, Argolis Regional Unit
- Inachos, a river flowing into the Aegean Sea
- Inachus, a king of Argos and personification of the same named river
- Inachos, a play by Sophocles
- Inachos, a river flowing into the river Achelous
- Inachus (crab), a genus of crabs in the family Inachidae
