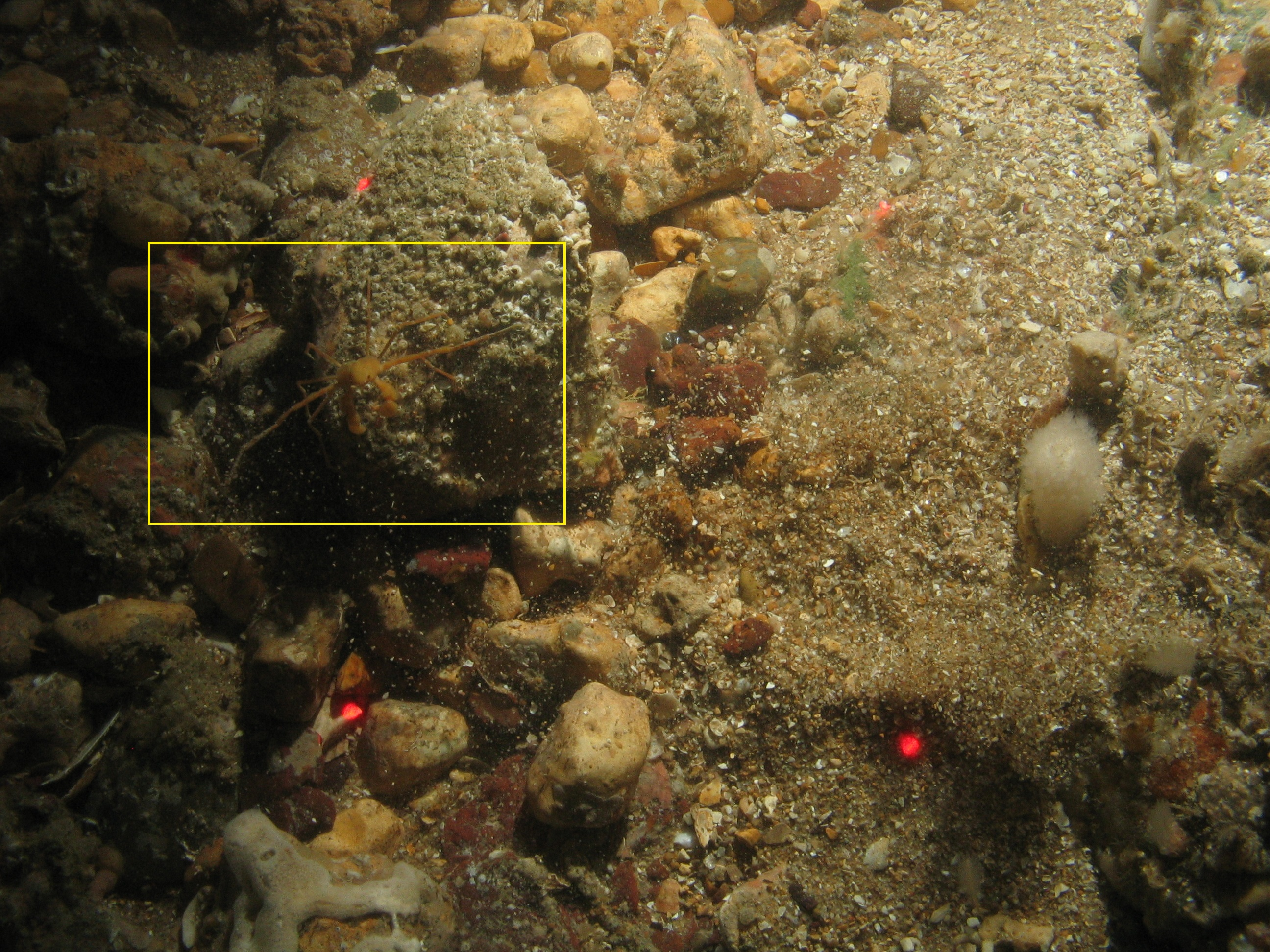

Scientific classification
- Kingdom: Animalia
- Phylum: Arthropoda
- Clade: Pancrustacea
- Class: Malacostraca
- Order: Decapoda
- Suborder: Pleocyemata
- Infraorder: Brachyura
- Family: Inachidae
- Genus: Inachus
- Species: I. phalangium

Binomial name
- Inachus phalangium (Fabricius, 1775)

Synonyms
- Cancer phalangium Fabricius, 1775 – nomen protectum; Cancer satuak Herbst, 1782; Cancer tribulus Linnaeus, 1767 – suppressed; Inachus dorhynchus Leach, 1814; Inachus dorynchus Leach, 1814; Macropus aracnides Risso, 1816

= Inachus phalangium =

Species of crab

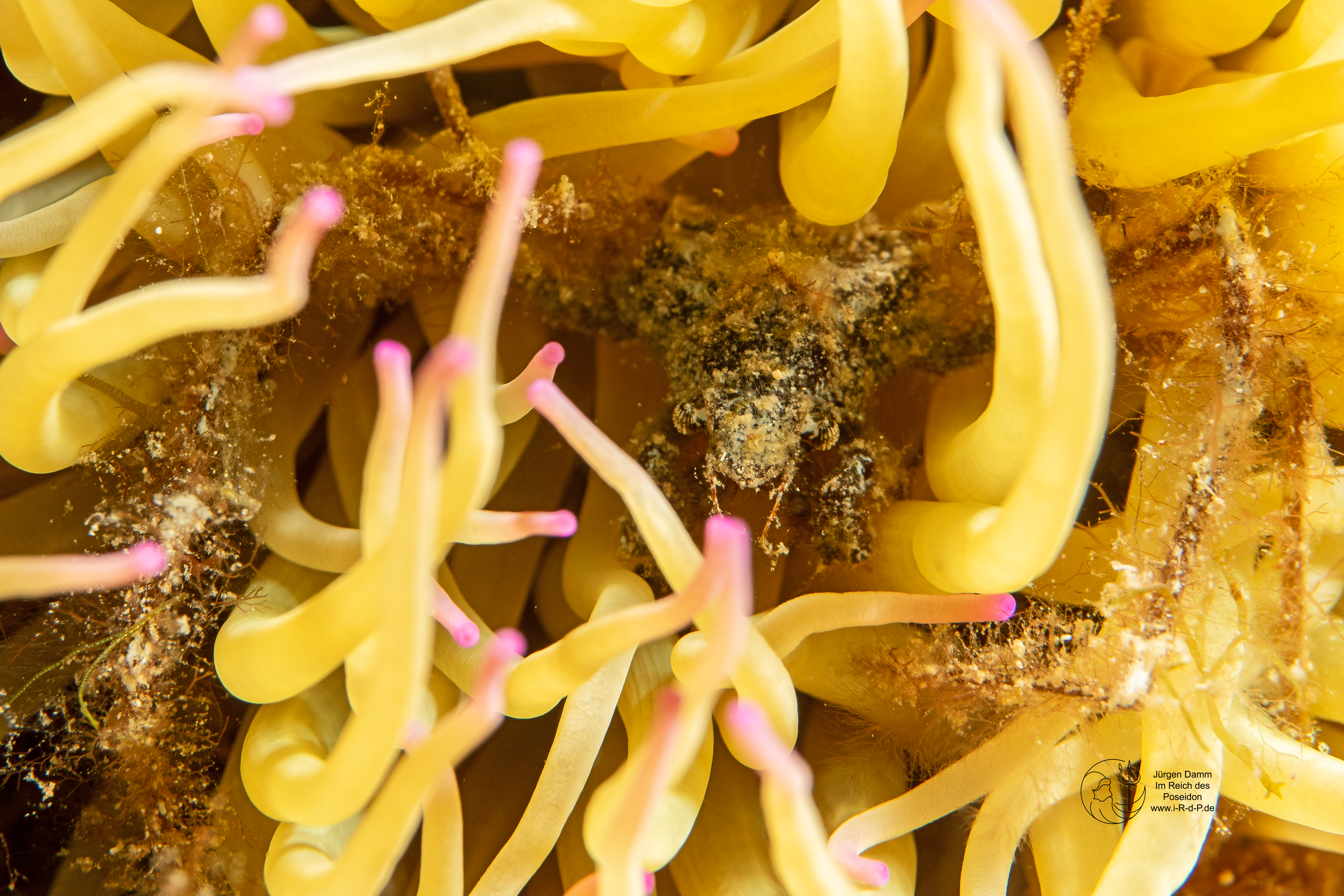

Inachus phalangium, or Leach's spider crab, is a species of crabs from the north-eastern Atlantic Ocean and Mediterranean Sea. It is up to 20.5 mm (0.81 in) wide, and is very similar to other species in the genus Inachus.

== Description ==
Large males may reach a carapace size of 20.5 by 17.5 millimetres (0.8 in × 0.7 in), and is brownish-yellow in colour. The carapace becomes narrower towards the front of the animal, and is often concealed by epibionts. I. phalangium resembles the closely related species Inachus dorsettensis, but has less prominent spines on the carapace.

== Distribution ==
Inachus phalangium is found in the eastern Atlantic Ocean, from Norway in the north to West Africa and the Cape Verde islands in the south, and extending into the Mediterranean Sea. It lives at depths of 11–55 metres (40–180 ft).

== Ecology ==
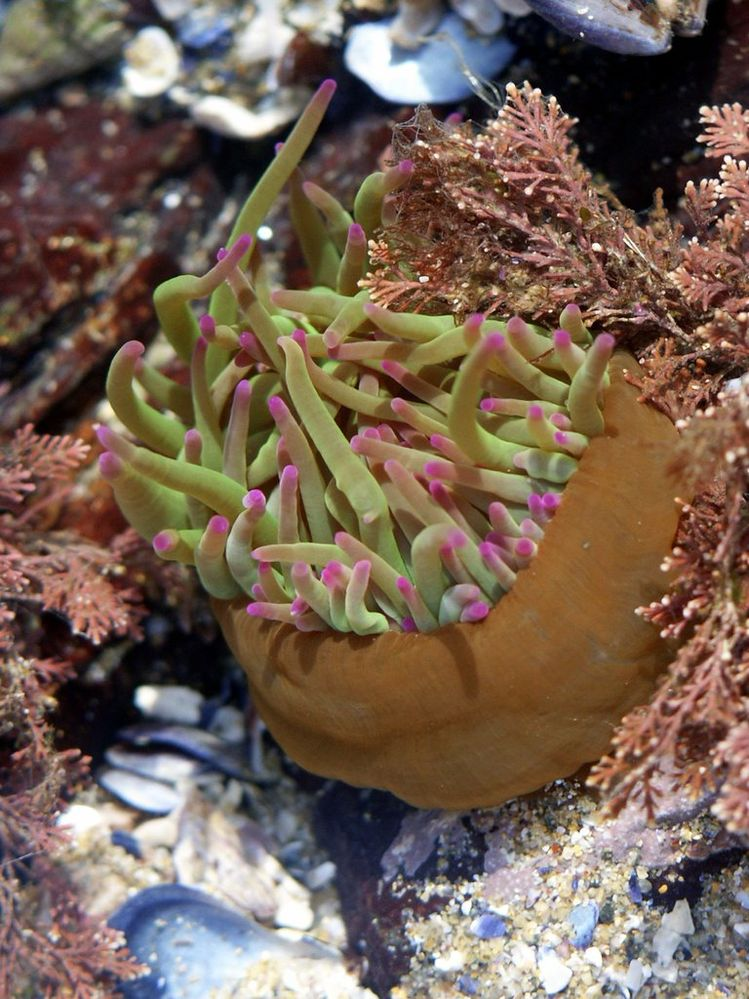
The snakelocks anemone, Anemonia sulcata

Inachus phalangium lives commensally with the sea anemone Anemonia sulcata (snakelocks anemone). The crab gains protection from potential predators by sheltering beneath the anemone's stinging tentacles. The crab eats particles of food dropped by the sea anemone, and mucus from the surface of the anemone.

== Taxonomy ==
The earliest scientific description of Leach's spider crab may have been Carl Linnaeus' description of "Cancer tribulus" in the 12th edition of his Systema Naturae in 1767. Linnaeus' description was, however, too vague to allow the species to be confidently identified. That name is therefore a nomen dubium, and it was suppressed by the International Commission on Zoological Nomenclature in 1964 at the request of Lipke Holthuis. The first valid description was Johan Christian Fabricius' publication of the name Cancer phalangium in his 1775 work Systema Entomologiae. The name Cancer phalangium was later protected by being placed on the Official List of Specific Names in Zoology.
