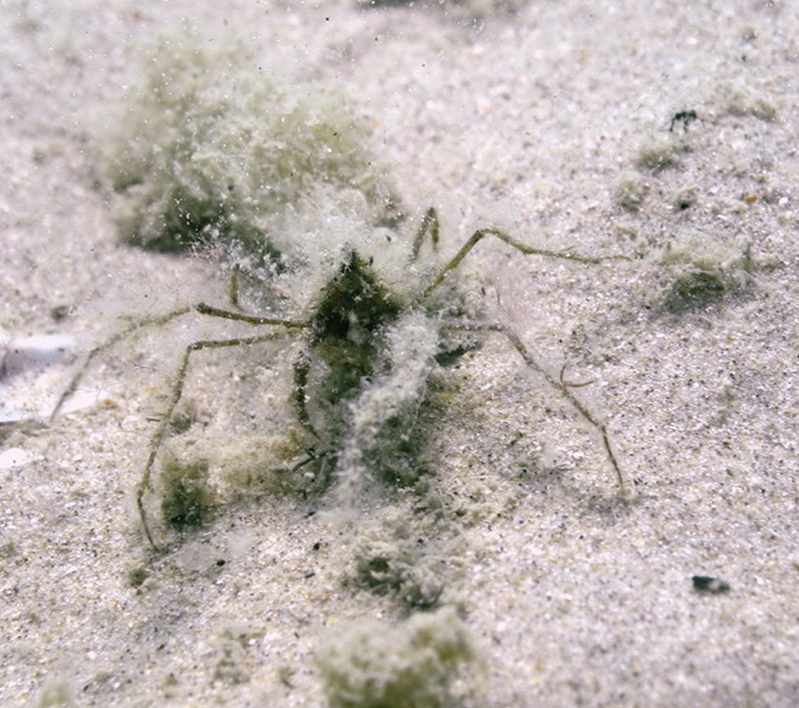
- Macropodia czernjawskii

Scientific classification
- Kingdom: Animalia
- Phylum: Arthropoda
- Clade: Pancrustacea
- Class: Malacostraca
- Order: Decapoda
- Suborder: Pleocyemata
- Infraorder: Brachyura
- Family: Inachidae
- Genus: Macropodia
- Species: M. czernjawskii

Binomial name
- Macropodia czernjawskii (Brandt, 1880)

= Macropodia czernjawskii =

Species of crab

Macropodia czernjawskii is a species of marine crab in the family Inachidae, found in European waters.
