= Macropodia formosa =

Scientific classification
- Kingdom: Animalia
- Phylum: Arthropoda
- Clade: Pancrustacea
- Class: Malacostraca
- Order: Decapoda
- Suborder: Pleocyemata
- Infraorder: Brachyura
- Family: Inachidae
- Genus: Macropodia
- Species: M. formosa

Binomial name
- Macropodia formosa Rathbun, 1911

Species of crab

Macropodia formosa is a species of marine crab in the family Inachidae, found on seamounts and knolls in the west Indian Ocean, near St. Brandon and the Mozambican coast.
