= Harlequin crab =

The common name harlequin crab may refer to:

- Lissocarcinus orbicularis, an Indo-Pacific species of swimming crab (Portunidae)
- Camposcia retusa, an Indo-Pacific species of spider crab (Inachidae)
