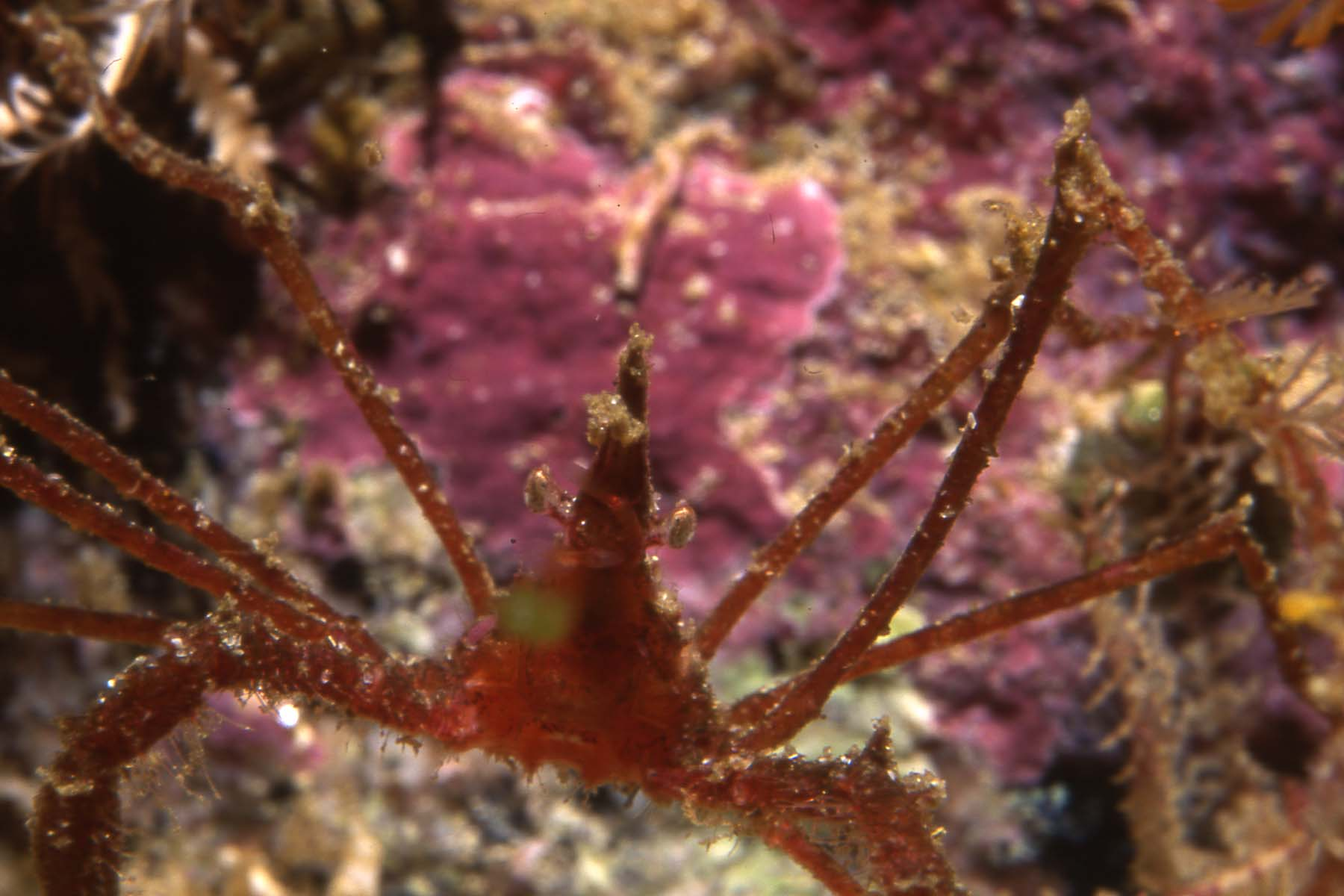

Scientific classification
- Kingdom: Animalia
- Phylum: Arthropoda
- Clade: Pancrustacea
- Class: Malacostraca
- Order: Decapoda
- Suborder: Pleocyemata
- Infraorder: Brachyura
- Family: Inachidae
- Genus: Macropodia
- Species: M. falcifera

Binomial name
- Macropodia falcifera (Stimpson, 1857)

= Macropodia falcifera =

Species of marine crab in the family Inachidae from South Africa

Macropodia falcifera, the Cape long-legged spider crab, is a species of marine crab found around the South African coast. It is a member of the family Inachidae.

== Distribution ==
The Cape long-legged spider crab is found from 15 to at least 35 m underwater, from the Cape Peninsula to East London. It is endemic to this region.

== Description ==
This crab has a small, arrowhead-shaped body, which may be 20 mm in height, and long, spindly legs, which may grow to 60 mm (2.4 in) in length. Its pincers are considerably sturdier than its legs and are tipped with white claws. The body is pinkish or reddish, and the legs and pincers are usually a darker red.

== Ecology ==
The animals often decorate themselves with hydroids or algae, and are often found on sea fans.
