= Macropodia tenuirostris =

Scientific classification
- Kingdom: Animalia
- Phylum: Arthropoda
- Clade: Pancrustacea
- Class: Malacostraca
- Order: Decapoda
- Suborder: Pleocyemata
- Infraorder: Brachyura
- Family: Inachidae
- Genus: Macropodia
- Species: M. tenuirostris

Binomial name
- Macropodia tenuirostris (Leach, 1814)

Species of crab

Macropodia tenuirostris, also known as the slender spider crab, is a species of marine crab in the family Inachidae.

== Description ==
Adult M. tenuirostris reach a carapace breadth of 11 millimeters, and a carapace length of 16 to 32 millimeters. The carapace is chestnut in color and triangular. Its surface is smooth to slightly coarse. The frontal region − its rostrum − is thick, long, narrow, slightly bent upwards, and contains numerous hook-setae. From a dorsal view, the eyestalks are clearly visible. Aside from the chelipeds, large in males and slender in females, the limbs are long and thin, with the dactylus of the fourth and fifth legs fairly bent.

== Ecology and biology ==
The slender spider crab is a free living, solitary, epibenthic, and gonochoristic omnivore. It has a life span of 3 to 5 years, with the duration of the larval development of 11 to 30 days. It can be found in European waters, from the Faroe Islands to Portugal, most commonly around the British Isles. It usually occurs in waters 9–97 meters deep, on muddy to hard substrata, or in estuaries. However, it can occasionally be found at depths down to 300 meters, in Sertularella colonies.
