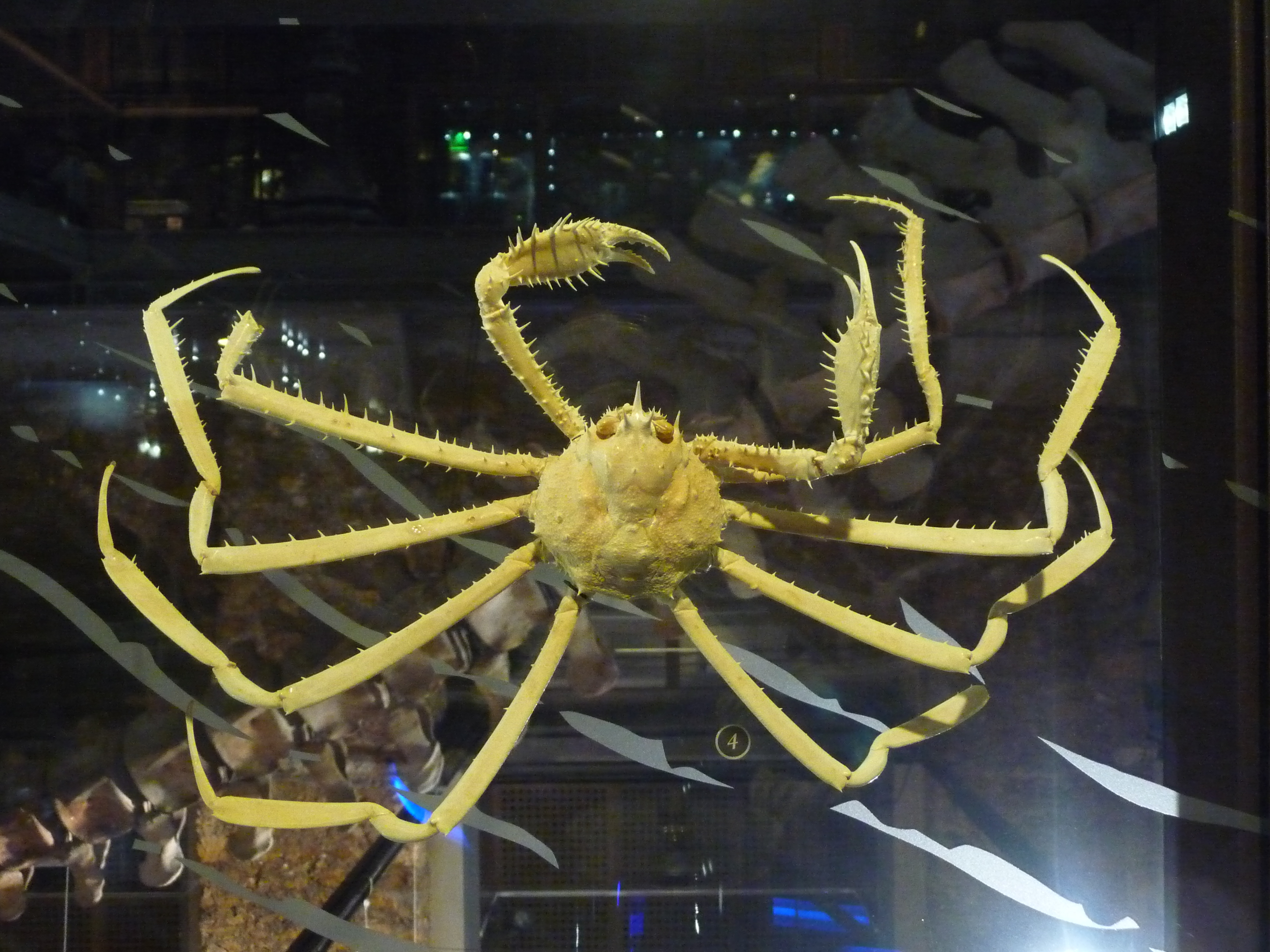

Scientific classification
- Kingdom: Animalia
- Phylum: Arthropoda
- Clade: Pancrustacea
- Class: Malacostraca
- Order: Decapoda
- Suborder: Pleocyemata
- Infraorder: Brachyura
- Family: Inachidae
- Genus: Platymaia
- Species: P. rebierei

Binomial name
- Platymaia rebierei Guinot & Richer de Forges, 1986

= Platymaia rebierei =

Species of crab

Platymaia rebierei is a species of crab in the family Inachidae.
