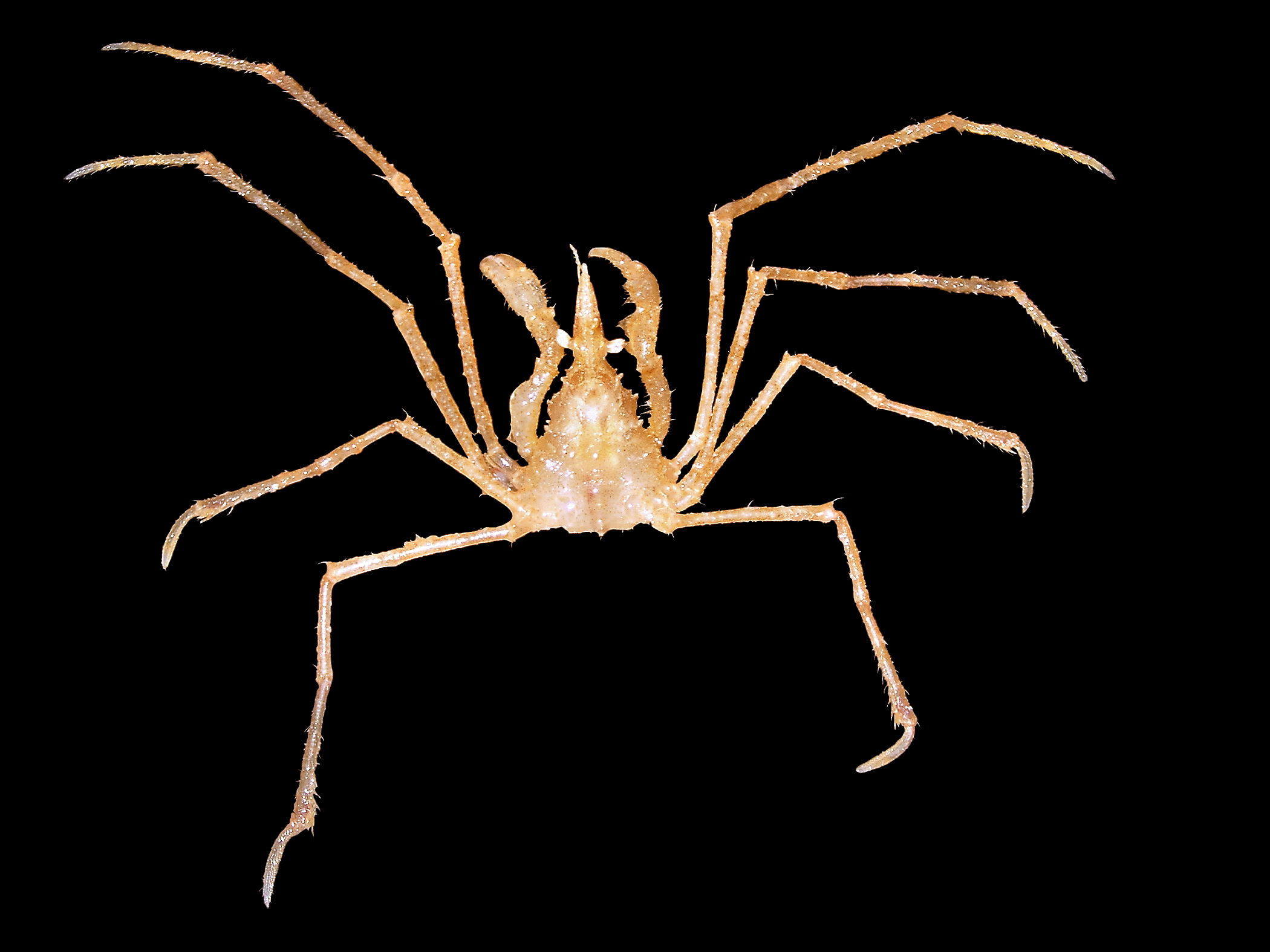
- Macropodia rostrata

Scientific classification
- Kingdom: Animalia
- Phylum: Arthropoda
- Clade: Pancrustacea
- Class: Malacostraca
- Order: Decapoda
- Suborder: Pleocyemata
- Infraorder: Brachyura
- Family: Inachidae
- Genus: Macropodia; Leach, 1814

Species
- See text

= Macropodia =

Genus of crabs

Macropodia is a genus of crabs, belonging to the family Inachidae. It contains the following species:

- Macropodia cirripilus Kensley, 1980
- Macropodia czernjawskii (Brandt, 1880)
- Macropodia deflexa Forest, 1978
- Macropodia doracis Manning & Holthuis, 1981
- Macropodia falcifera (Stimpson, 1857)
- Macropodia formosa Rathbun, 1911
- Macropodia gilsoni (Capart, 1951)
- Macropodia hesperiae Manning & Holthuis, 1981
- Macropodia intermedia Bouvier, 1940
- Macropodia linaresi Forest & Zariquiey Alvarez, 1964
- Macropodia longicornis A. Milne-Edwards & Bouvier, 1899
- Macropodia longirostris (Fabricius, 1775)
- Macropodia macrocheles (A. Milne-Edwards & Bouvier, 1898)
- Macropodia rostrata (Linnaeus, 1761)
- Macropodia straeleni Capart, 1951
- Macropodia tenuirostris (Leach, 1814)
- Macropodia trigonus Richer de Forges, 1993
