= Achaeopsis =

Scientific classification
- Kingdom: Animalia
- Phylum: Arthropoda
- Clade: Pancrustacea
- Class: Malacostraca
- Order: Decapoda
- Suborder: Pleocyemata
- Infraorder: Brachyura
- Family: Inachidae
- Genus: Achaeopsis; Stimpson, 1857
- Species: A. spinulosa

Binomial name
- Achaeopsis spinulosa Stimpson, 1857

Synonyms
- Achaeopsis spinulosus Stimpson, 1857 (incorrect gender)

Species of crab

Achaeopsis spinulosa, the hotlips spider crab, is a species of crab in the family Inachidae, found only around the South African coast. It is the only species in the genus Achaeopsis.

== Distribution ==
The crab is found from False Bay to Durban, subtidally to 43 metres (141 ft). It is endemic to this region.

== Description ==
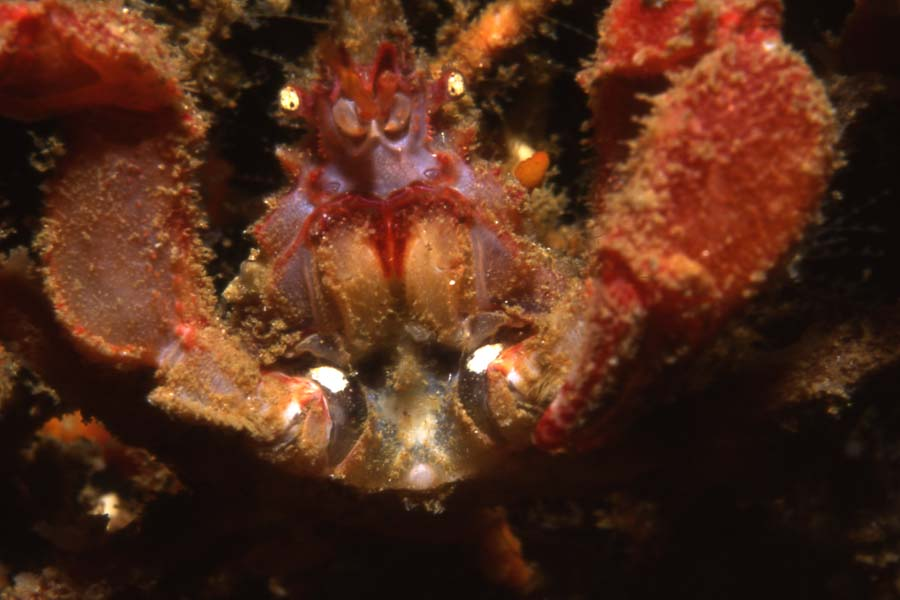
close-up of the mouthparts of the hotlips spider crab

Achaeopsis spinulosa is commonly known as the hotlips spider crab because of the vivid red marking around its mouth. It is a small spider crab with relatively long, but quite sturdy legs. It may grow to 70 millimetres (2.8 in) across. Its carapace is rounded, tapering to a blunt tip. Its pincers are raggedly striped in white and red.

== Ecology ==
The crab decorates its body with sponges, hydroids, or algae, improving its camouflage. It is rarely seen without some form of decoration. It is often found among striped anemones and on sea fans.
