= Macrocheira longirostra =

Scientific classification
- Kingdom: Animalia
- Phylum: Arthropoda
- Class: Malacostraca
- Order: Decapoda
- Suborder: Pleocyemata
- Infraorder: Brachyura
- Family: Macrocheiridae
- Genus: Macrocheira
- Species: †M. longirostra

Binomial name
- †Macrocheira longirostra Scheitzer & Feldmann, 1999

Fossil species of crab

Macrocheira longirostra is a fossil species of crab that lived in Japan during the Late Oligocene to Early Miocene.
