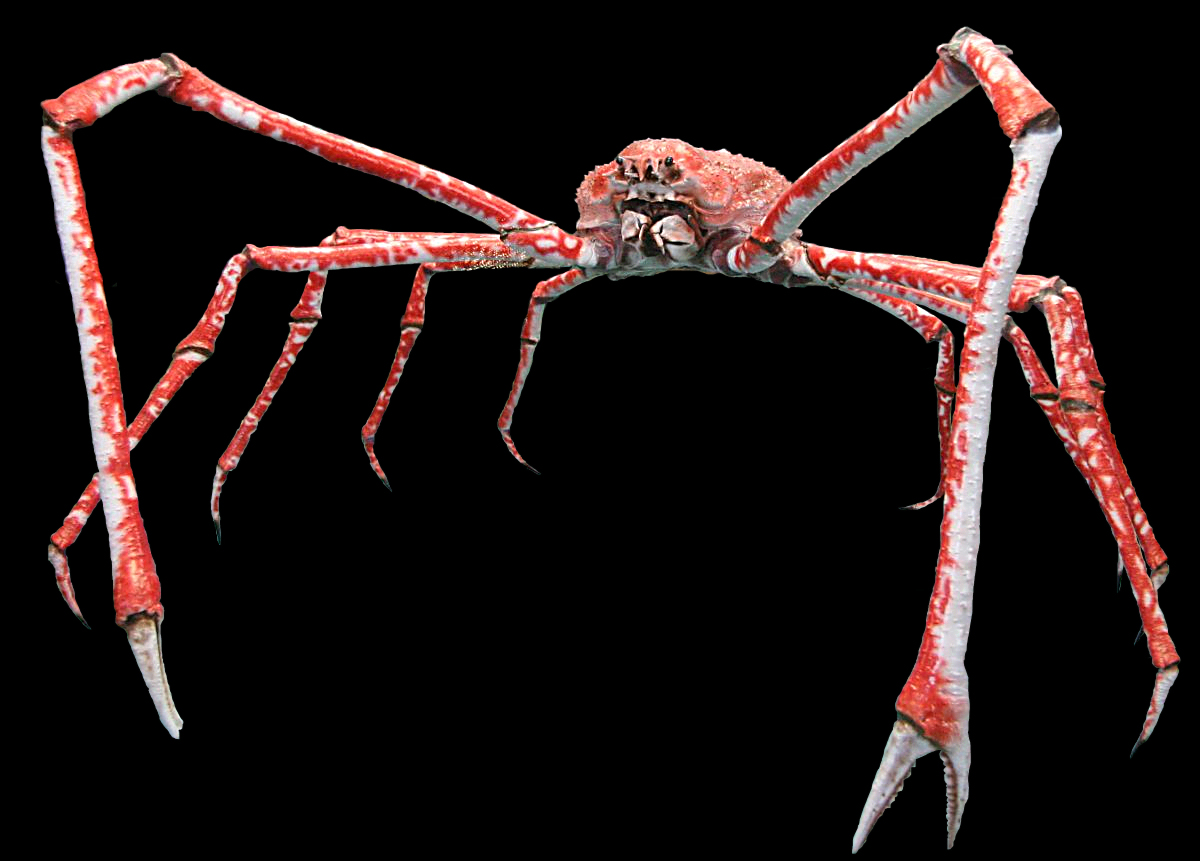
- Macrocheira kaempferi

Scientific classification
- Kingdom: Animalia
- Phylum: Arthropoda
- Class: Malacostraca
- Order: Decapoda
- Suborder: Pleocyemata
- Infraorder: Brachyura
- Superfamily: Majoidea
- Family: Macrocheiridae; Dana, 1851
- Genus: Macrocheira de Haan, 1839

= Macrocheira =

Genus of crab

Macrocheira is a genus of crab in the superfamily Majoidea. It contains the Japanese spider crab (Macrocheira kaempferi) as well as an extinct species, Macrocheira longirostra.
