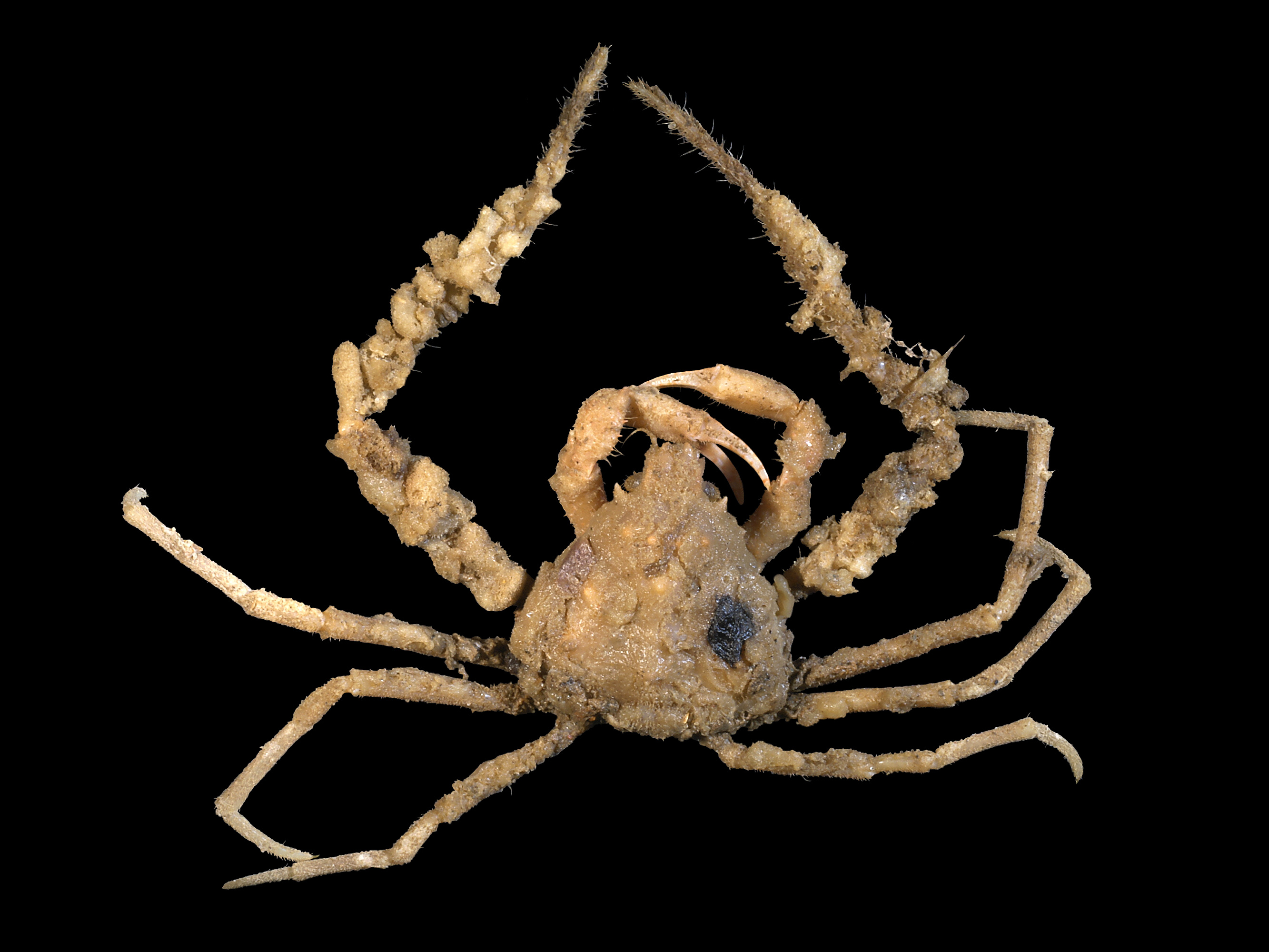

Scientific classification
- Kingdom: Animalia
- Phylum: Arthropoda
- Clade: Pancrustacea
- Class: Malacostraca
- Order: Decapoda
- Suborder: Pleocyemata
- Infraorder: Brachyura
- Family: Inachidae
- Genus: Inachus
- Species: I. dorsettensis

Binomial name
- Inachus dorsettensis (Pennant, 1777)

= Scorpion spider crab =

Species of crab

Inachus dorsettensis, commonly known as the scorpion spider crab, is a species of crab generally found on loose substrates (stony bottoms to mud) from 6 metres (20 ft) depth down to about 100 m (330 ft).

== Description ==
Scorpion spider crab on the Sussex coast

They are usually seen covered with sponge which they apply themselves. The carapace of a fully grown male is roughly 30 millimetres (1.2 in) long and slightly narrower than it is long.

Inachus dorsettensis resembles the closely related species Inachus phalangium, but has more prominent spines on the carapace. They molt, with the intermolting period being shorter the warmer the water they reside in is.

== Distribution ==
Scorpion spider crab is found along the east coast of the Atlantic Ocean from Norway to South Africa, and also in the Mediterranean Sea.
