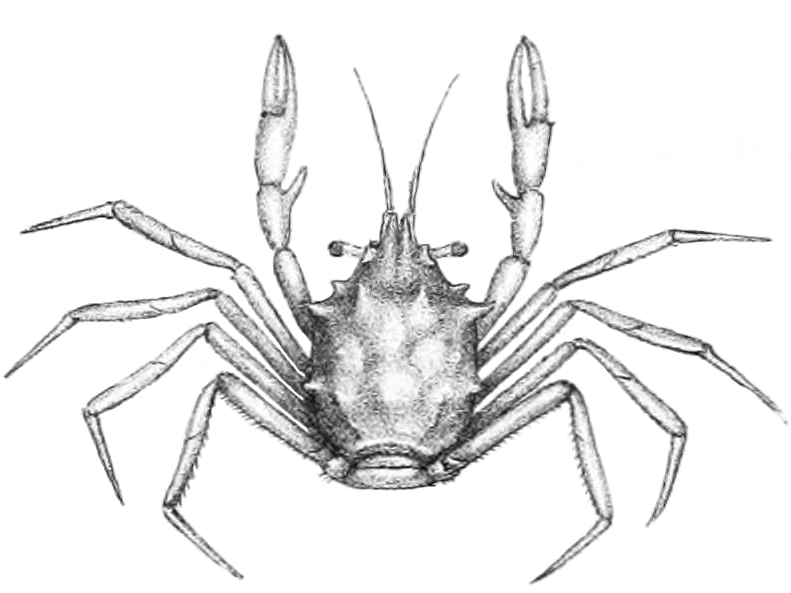
- Paratymolus pubescens

Scientific classification
- Kingdom: Animalia
- Phylum: Arthropoda
- Clade: Pancrustacea
- Class: Malacostraca
- Order: Decapoda
- Suborder: Pleocyemata
- Infraorder: Brachyura
- Family: Inachidae
- Genus: Paratymolus; Miers, 1879

Species
- List: Paratymolus Miers, 1879; Paratymolus Miers, 1879 (type species Paratymolus; pubescens Miers, 1879, by monotypy; gender masculine); Paratymolus barnardi Loh & Ng, 1999; Paratymolus bituberculatus Haswell, 1880; Paratymolus bituberculatus var. gracilis Miers, 1884; Paratymolus coccus Loh & Ng, 1999; Paratymolus cygnus Loh & Ng, 1999; Paratymolus griffini Loh & Ng, 1999; Paratymolus hastatus Alcock, 1895; Paratymolus prolatus Loh & Ng, 1999; Paratymolus pubescens Miers, 1879; Paratymolus vannus Loh & Ng, 1999

= Paratymolus =

Genus of crab

Paratymolus is a genus of small marine crabs, found from a wide region in the Indo-West Pacific, including Singapore. Originally, P. latipes and P. sexspinosus were thought to be part of this genus, but they were subsequently clarified to be part of two other genera, Dumea and Litosus respectively.

== Habitat ==
Crabs of this genus can be found in coastal areas of the Pacific ocean. This includes Australia, Singapore, Korea and Indonesia. This genus is often found from locations with sandy seabeds, mudflats, or reefs.

== Morphology ==
This genus is identifiable through the presence of one or more small rounded protuberances on the rear-side edge of the carapace, as well as moderately-long eye stalks.

== Conservation status ==
This genus is not listed in the IUCN Red List of Threatened species, and most of these species has not been evaluated globally. However, Paratymolus cygnus itself is identified as critically endangered locally.
