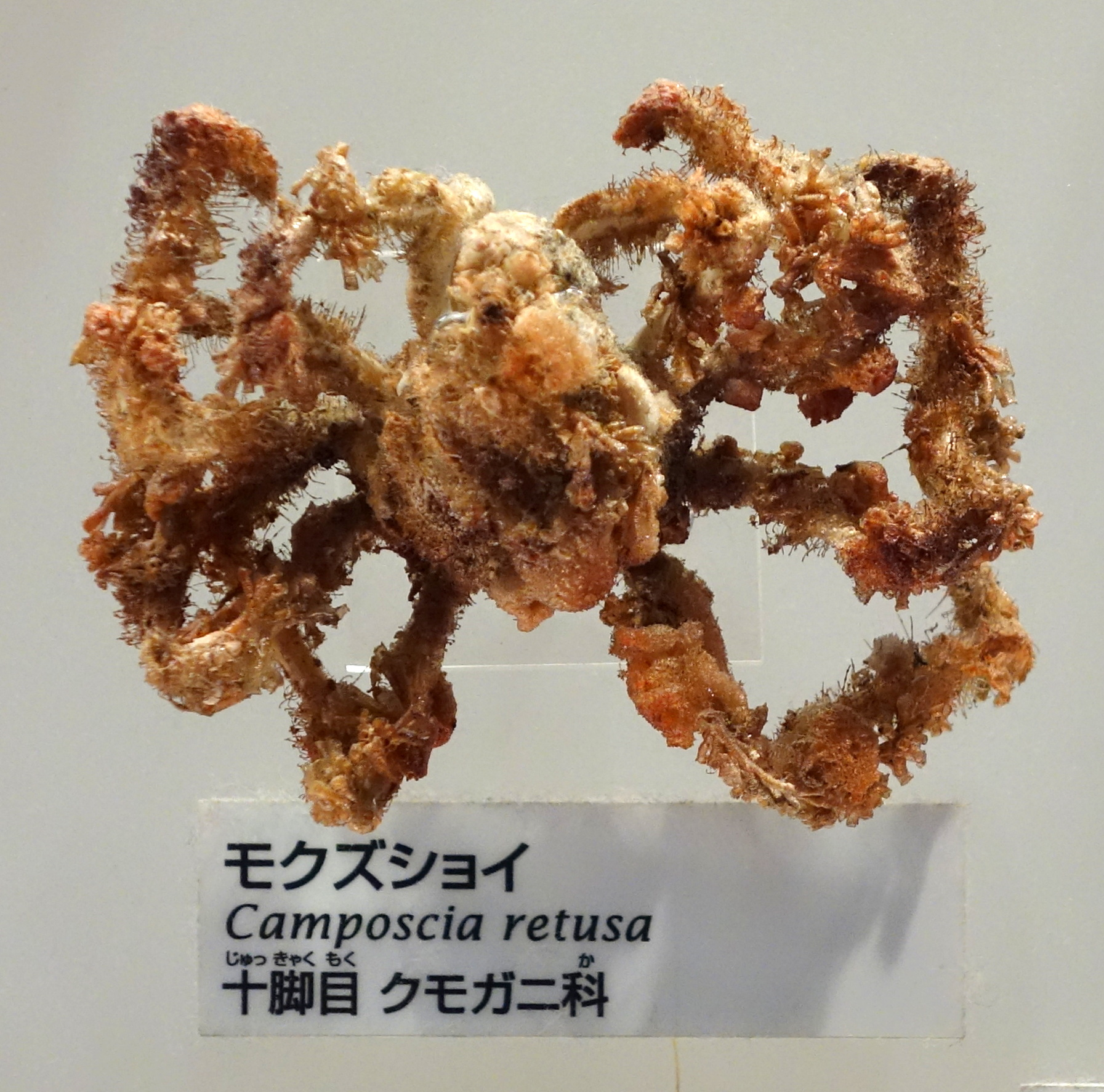

Scientific classification
- Kingdom: Animalia
- Phylum: Arthropoda
- Clade: Pancrustacea
- Class: Malacostraca
- Order: Decapoda
- Suborder: Pleocyemata
- Infraorder: Brachyura
- Family: Inachidae
- Genus: Camposcia (Latreille, 1829)
- Species: C. retusa

Binomial name
- Camposcia retusa (Latreille, 1829)

= Camposcia =

Species of crab

Camposcia retusa, known commonly as the velcro crab, spider decorator crab, or harlequin crab, is a species of marine crustacea in the family Inachidae. It is known for attaching living sponges and corals to itself, which camouflage it. It is the only species in the genus Camposcia.

The velcro crab is widespread throughout the tropical waters of the Indo-West Pacific area, including the Red Sea.

== Description ==
This crab has a shell size of 3 cm and with the legs it can reach 10 cm.
