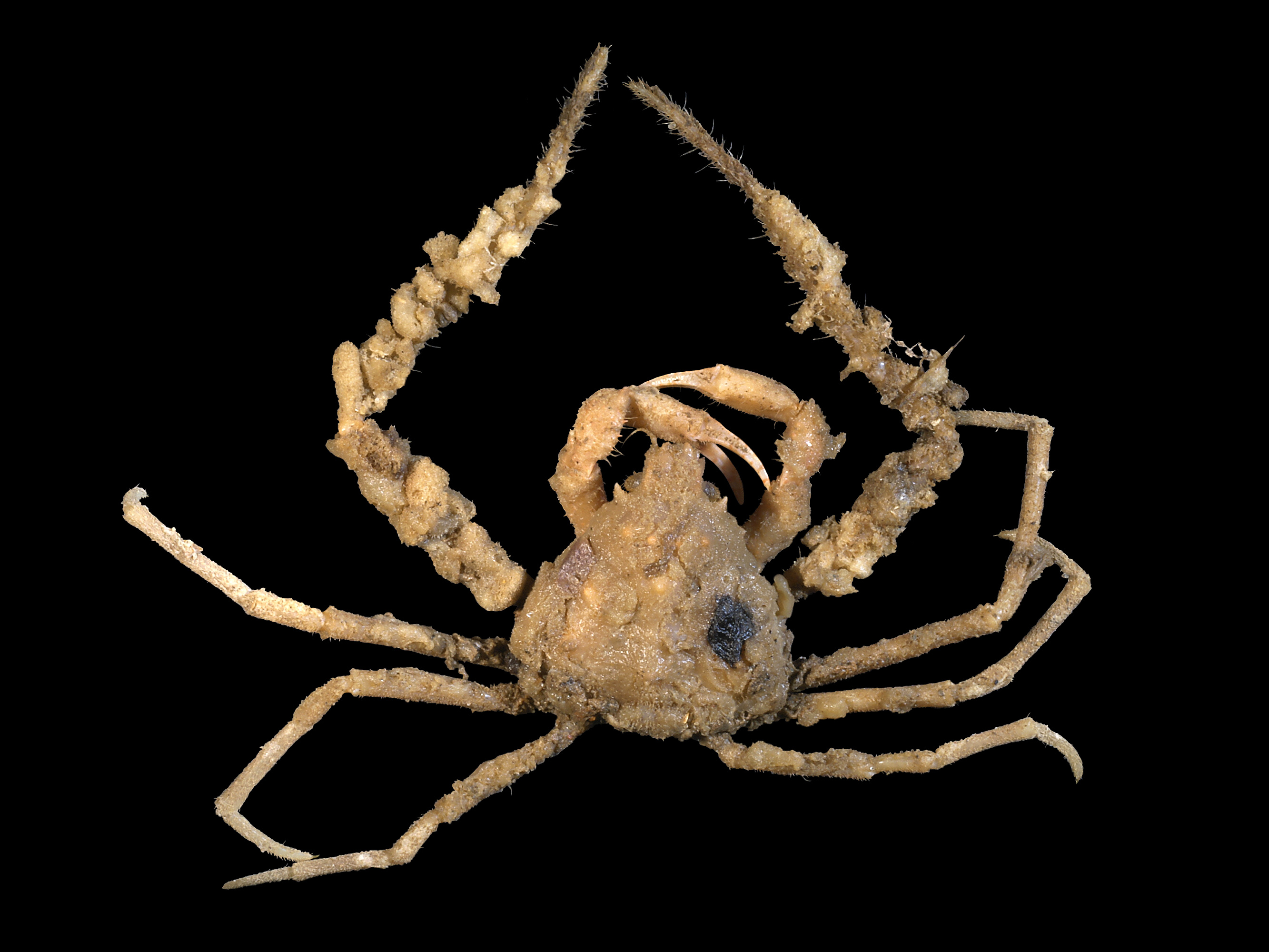
- Inachus dorsettensis

Scientific classification
- Domain: Eukaryota
- Kingdom: Animalia
- Phylum: Arthropoda
- Class: Malacostraca
- Order: Decapoda
- Suborder: Pleocyemata
- Infraorder: Brachyura
- Family: Inachidae
- Genus: Inachus; Weber, 1795

Type species
- Cancer scorpio Fabricius, 1779

= Inachus (crab) =

Genus of crabs

Inachus is a genus of crab, containing the following species:

- Inachus aguiarii Brito Capello, 1876
- Inachus angolensis Capart, 1951
- Inachus biceps Manning & Holthuis, 1981
- Inachus communissimus Rizza, 1839
- Inachus complectens (Rathbun, 1911)
- Inachus dorsettensis (Pennant, 1777)
- Inachus grallator Manning & Holthuis, 1981
- Inachus guentheri (Miers, 1879)
- Inachus leptochirus Leach, 1817
- Inachus mauritanicus Lucas, 1846
- Inachus nanus Manning & Holthuis, 1981
- Inachus phalangium (Fabricius, 1775)
- Inachus thoracicus Roux, 1830
