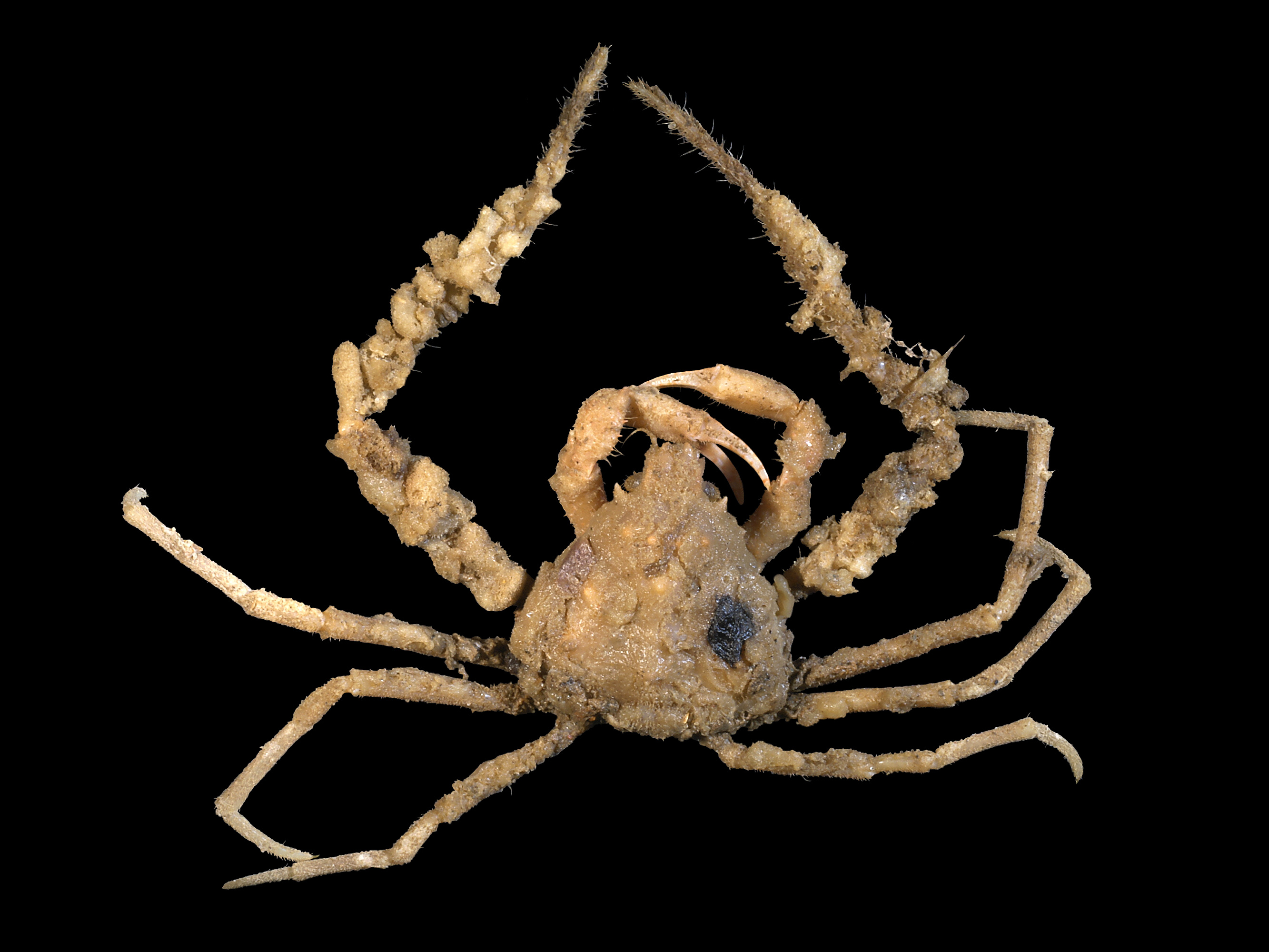
- Inachus dorsettensis

Scientific classification
- Kingdom: Animalia
- Phylum: Arthropoda
- Class: Malacostraca
- Order: Decapoda
- Suborder: Pleocyemata
- Infraorder: Brachyura
- Superfamily: Majoidea
- Family: Inachidae; MacLeay, 1838

= Inachidae =

Inachidae Temporal range: Oligocene–recent

Family of crabs

Inachidae is a family of crabs, containing the following genera:

- Achaeopsis Stimpson, 1857
- Anomalothir Miers, 1879
- Calypsachaeus Manning & Holthuis, 1981
- Camposcia Latreille, 1829
- Capartiella Manning & Holthuis, 1981
- Chalaroachaeus De Man, 1902
- Chorinachus Griffin & Tranter, 1986
- Ephippias Rathbun, 1918
- Erileptus Rathbun, 1894
- Litosus Loh & Ng, 1999
- Metoporhaphis Stimpson, 1860
- Oncinopus De Haan, 1839
- Paratymolus Miers, 1879
- Physachaeus Alcock, 1895
- Podochela Stimpson, 1860
- Prosphorachaeus Takeda & Miyake, 1969
- Rhinospinosa Griffin & Tranter, 1986
- Sunipea Griffin & Tranter, 1986
- Eucinetopinae Števčić, 2005
  - Eucinetops Stimpson, 1860
- Inachinae MacLeay, 1838
  - Achaeus Leach, 1817
  - Dorhynchus Thomson, 1873
  - Dumea Loh & Ng, 1999
  - Encephaloides Wood-Mason in Wood-Mason & Alcock, 1891
  - Eurypodius Guérin, 1828
  - Inachus Weber, 1795
  - Macropodia Leach, 1814
- Podochelinae Neumann, 1878
  - Anisonotus A. Milne-Edwards, 1879
  - Coryrhynchus Kingsley, 1880
  - Ericerodes Rathbun, 1897
