= List of Atlantic decapod species =

This is a list of decapod crustaceans found in the North and South Atlantic Oceans.

== Dendrobranchiata ==
- Acetes americanus
- Artemesia longinaris
- Aristaeomorpha foliacea
- Farfantepenaeus aztecus
- Farfantepenaeus brasiliensis
- Farfantepenaeus duorarum
- Farfantepenaeus notialis – Southern pink shrimp
- Farfantepenaeus paulensis
- Hadropenaeus affinis
- Hadropenaeus modestus
- Litopenaeus schmitti
- Litopenaeus setiferus
- Lucifer faxoni
- Lucifer typus
- Mesopenaeus tropicalis
- Metapenaeopsis goodei
- Parapenaeus americanus
- Parapenaeus politus
- Peisos petrunkevitchi
- Penaeopsis serrata
- Pleoticus muelleri
- Pleoticus robustus
- Philocheras gorei
- Plesionika edwardsii
- Plesionika martia
- Plesionika tenuipes
- Plesionika willisi
- Rimapenaeus constrictus
- Sicyonia brevirostris
- Sicyonia burkenroadi
- Sicyonia dorsalis
- Sicyonia laevigata
- Sicyonia laevigata
- Sicyonia parri
- Sicyonia parri
- Sicyonia stimpsoni
- Sicyonia typica
- Solenocera atlantidis
- Solenocera necopina
- Solenocera vioscai
- Xiphopenaeus kroyeri

== Caridea ==
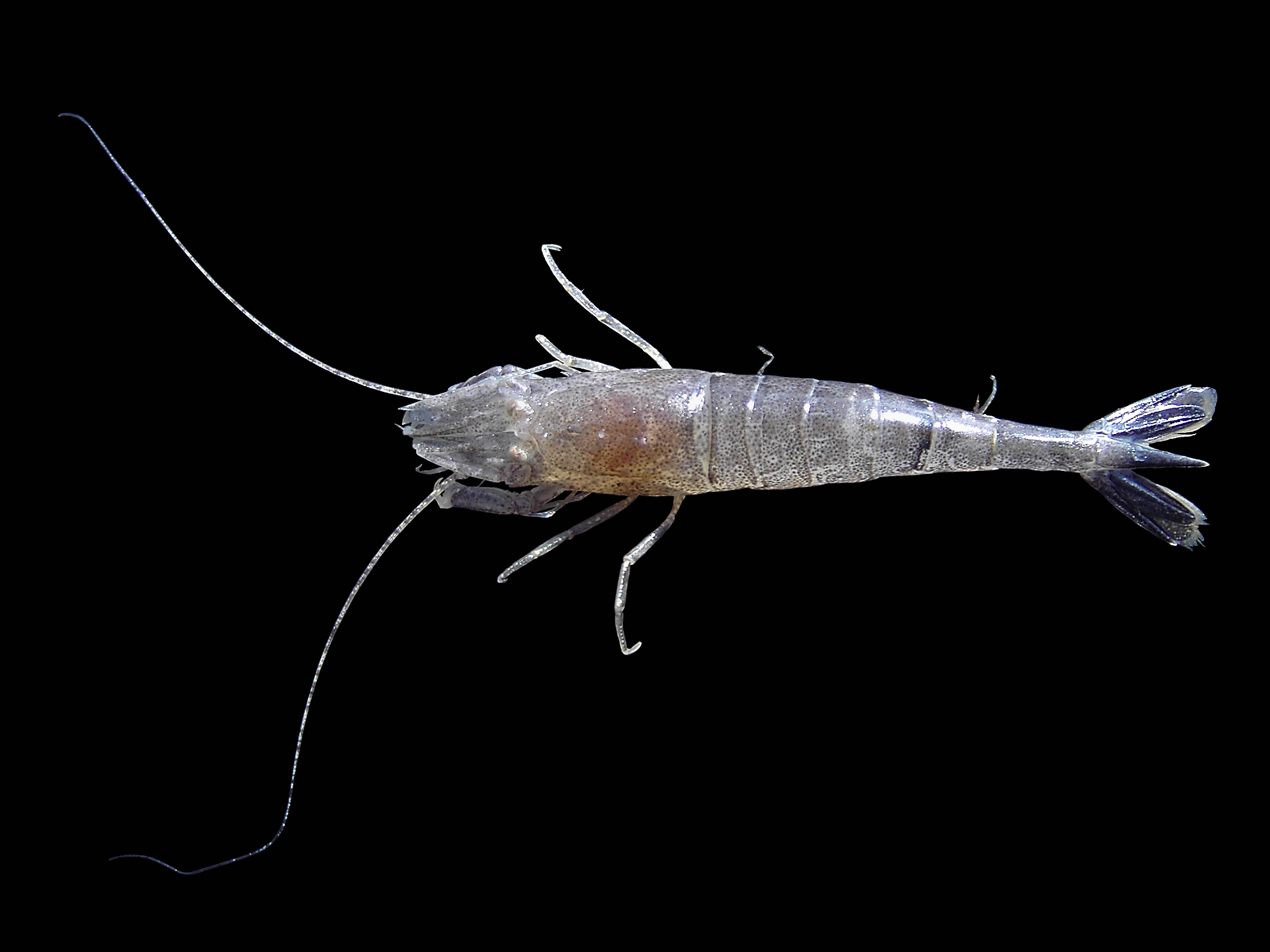
Crangon crangon

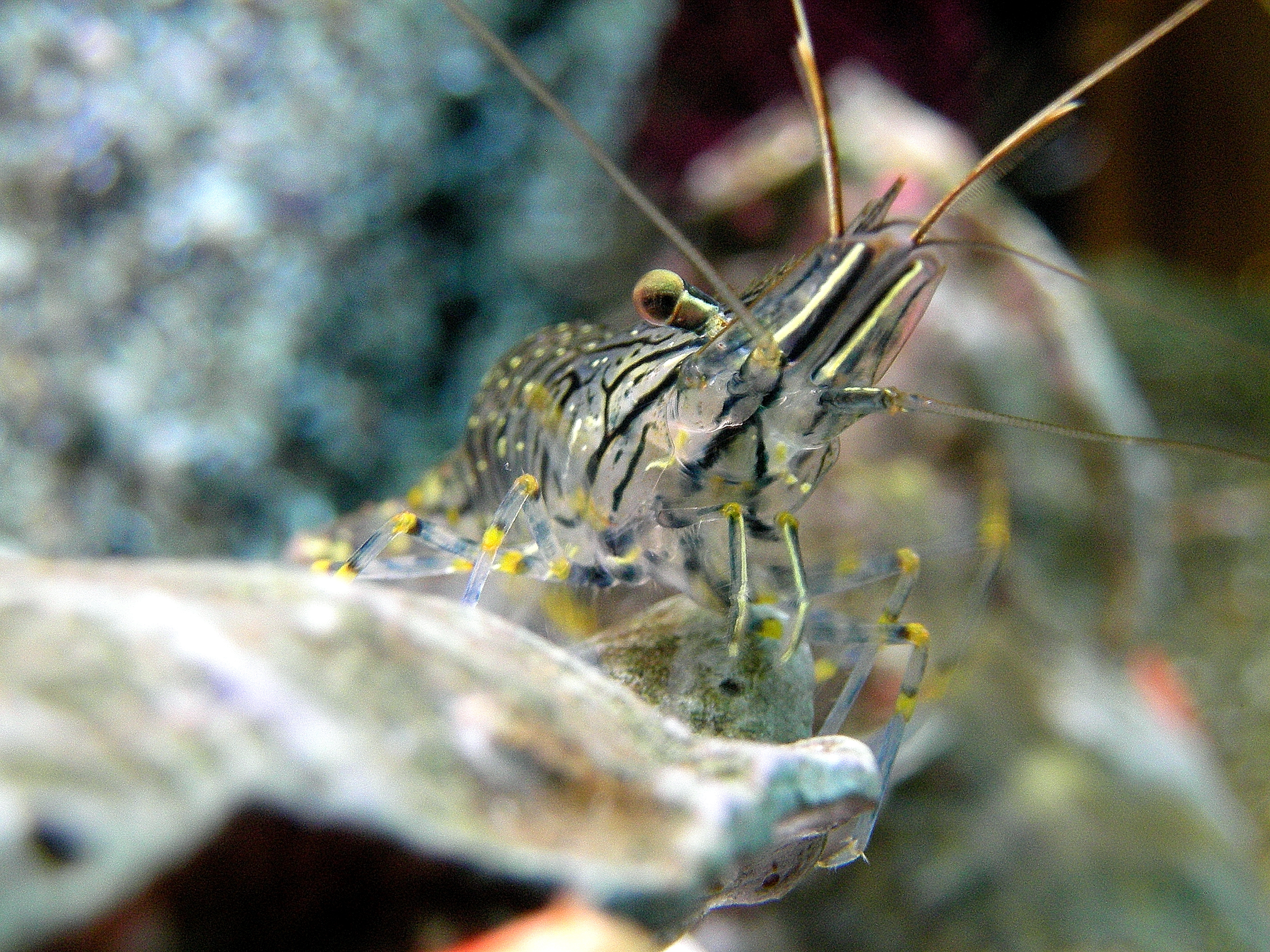
Palaemon elegans

- Alpheus angulosus
- Alpheus armillatus
- Alpheus estuariensis
- Alpheus formosus
- Alpheus heterochaelis
- Alpheus intrinsecus
- Alpheus normanni
- Anchistioides antiguensis
- Automate dolichognatha
- Automate evermanni
- Brachycarpus biunguiculatus
- Bythocaris nana
- Crangon crangon
- Crangon septemspinosa
- Discias atlanticus
- Discias vernbergi
- Exhippolysmata oplophoroides
- Gnathophyllum modestum
- Heterocarpus ensifer
- Hippolyte coerulescens
- Hippolyte obliquimanus
- Hippolyte pleuracanthus
- Hippolyte zostericola
- Latreutes fucorum
- Latreutes parvulus
- Leander tenuicornis
- Leptalpheus forceps
- Leptochela bermudensis
- Leptochela carinata
- Leptochela papulata
- Leptochela serratorbita
- Lysmata intermedia
- Lysmata rathbunae
- Lysmata wurdemanni
- Macrobrachium acanthurus
- Macrobrachium carcinus
- Macrobrachium ohione
- Macrobrachium olfersii
- Merhippolyte americana
- Neopontonides beaufortensis
- Nikoides schmitti
- Ogyrides alphaerostris
- Ogyrides hayi
- Palaemon serratus
- Palaemonetes intermedius
- Palaemonetes pugio
- Palaemonetes vulgaris
- Pandalus borealis
- Pantomus parvulus
- Periclimenaeus ascidiarum
- Periclimenaeus atlanticus
- Periclimenaeus schmitti
- Periclimenaeus wilsoni
- Periclimenes americanus
- Periclimenes iridescens
- Periclimenes longicaudatus
- Periclimenes pedersoni
- Periclimenes yucatanicus – spotted cleaner shrimp
- Pontonia domestica
- Pontonia manningi
- Pontophilus brevirostris
- Processa bermudensis
- Processa guyanae
- Processa hemphilli
- Processa profunda
- Processa tenuipes
- Processa vicina
- Synalpheus apioceros
- Synalpheus fritzmuelleri
- Synalpheus longicarpus
- Synalpheus minus
- Synalpheus pectiniger
- Synalpheus townsendi
- Thor dobkini
- Thor floridanus
- Thor manningi
- Tozeuma carolinense
- Tozeuma serratum
- Trachycaris rugosa
- Typton vulcanus
- Xiphocaris elongata

== Stenopodidea ==
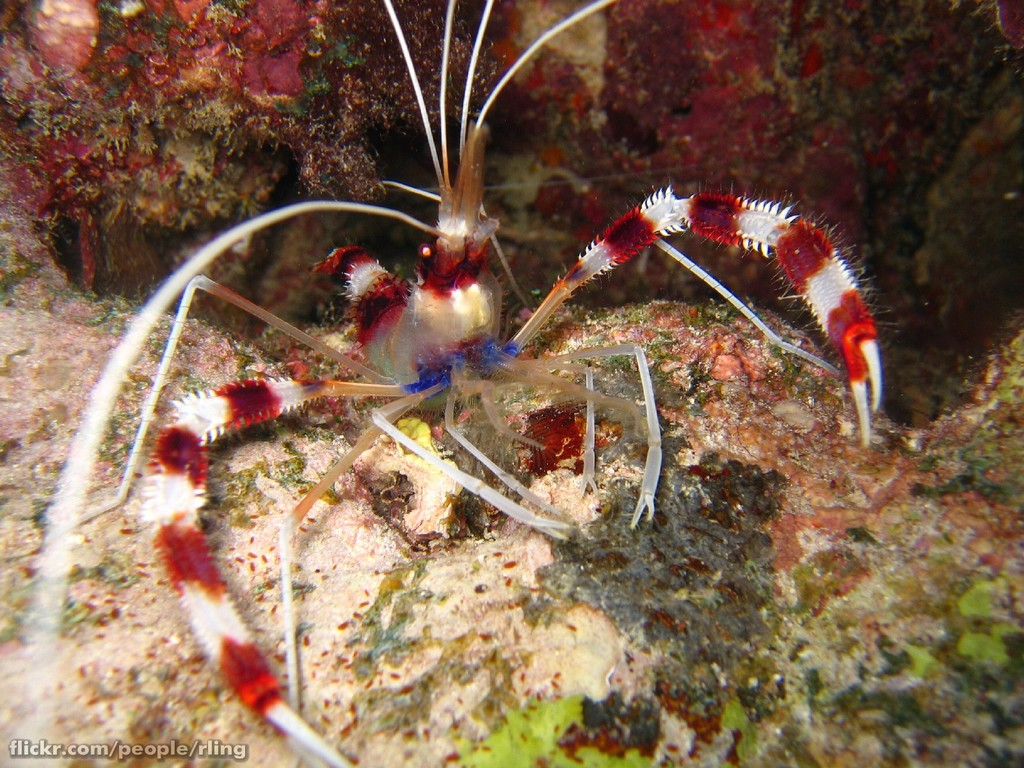
Stenopus hispidus

- Stenopus hispidus
- Stenopus scutellatus

== Spiny lobsters and allies ==
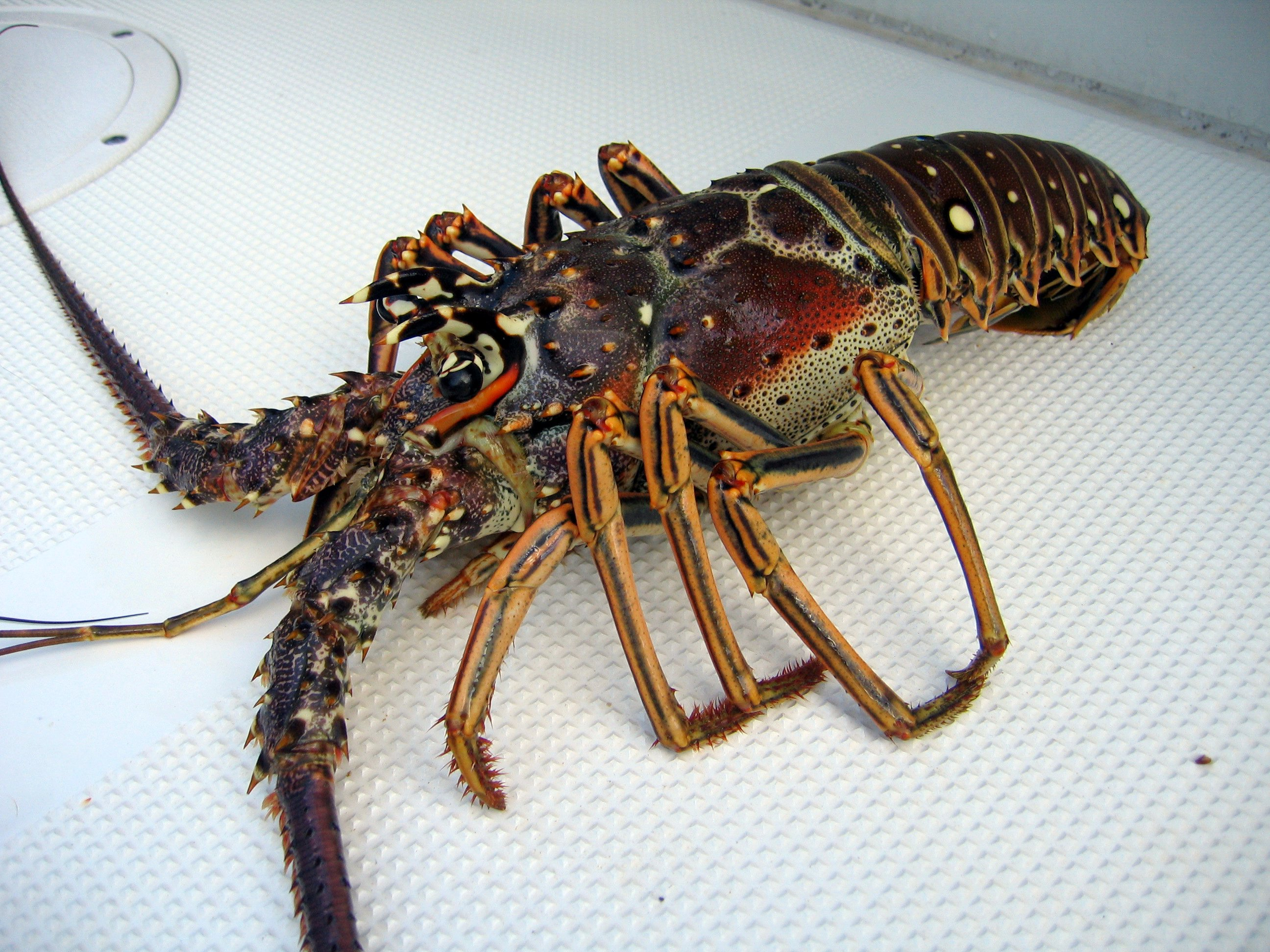
Panulirus argus

- Arctides guineensis
- Jasus lalandii – Cape rock lobster
- Jasus tristani – Tristan rock lobster
- Justitia longimanus
- Palinurellus gundlachi
- Palinurus charlestoni
- Palinurus elephas – European spiny lobster
- Palinurus mauritanicus
- Palinustus truncatus
- Panulirus argus
- Panulirus echinatus
- Panulirus guttatus
- Panulirus laevicauda
- Panulirus regius
- Parribacus antarcticus
- Projasus parkeri
- Scyllarides aequinoctialis
- Scyllarides brasiliensis
- Scyllarides deceptor
- Scyllarides delfosi
- Scyllarides herklotsii
- Scyllarides latus
- Scyllarides nodifer
- Scyllarus americanus
- Scyllarus arctus
- Scyllarus chacei
- Scyllarus depressus
- Scyllarus pygmaeus

== Axiidea and Gebiidea ==
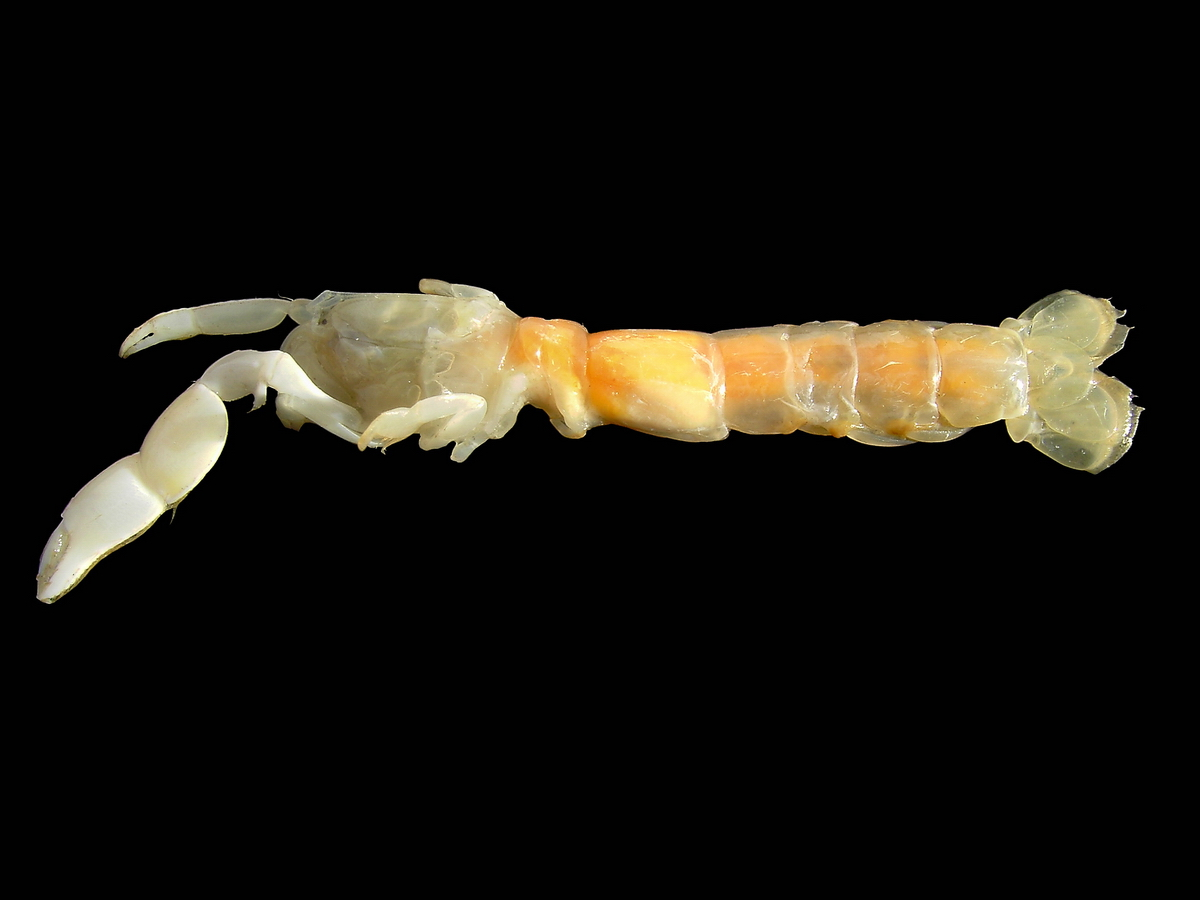
Pestarella tyrrhena

- Acanthaxius hirsutimanus
- Axius armatus
- Axius serratus
- Biffarius biformis
- Biffarius fragilis
- Calaxius jenneri
- Callianassa subterranea
- Calliapagurops charcoti
- Callichirus major
- Calocaris templemani
- Cheramus marginatus
- Gilvossius setimanus
- Lepidophthalmus turneranus
- Naushonia crangonoides
- Necallianassa berylae
- Paraxiopsis gracilimana
- Pestarella tyrrhena
- Upogebia affinis
- Upogebia deltaura
- Upogebia pusilla
- Vulcanocalliax arutyunovi

== Lobsters ==
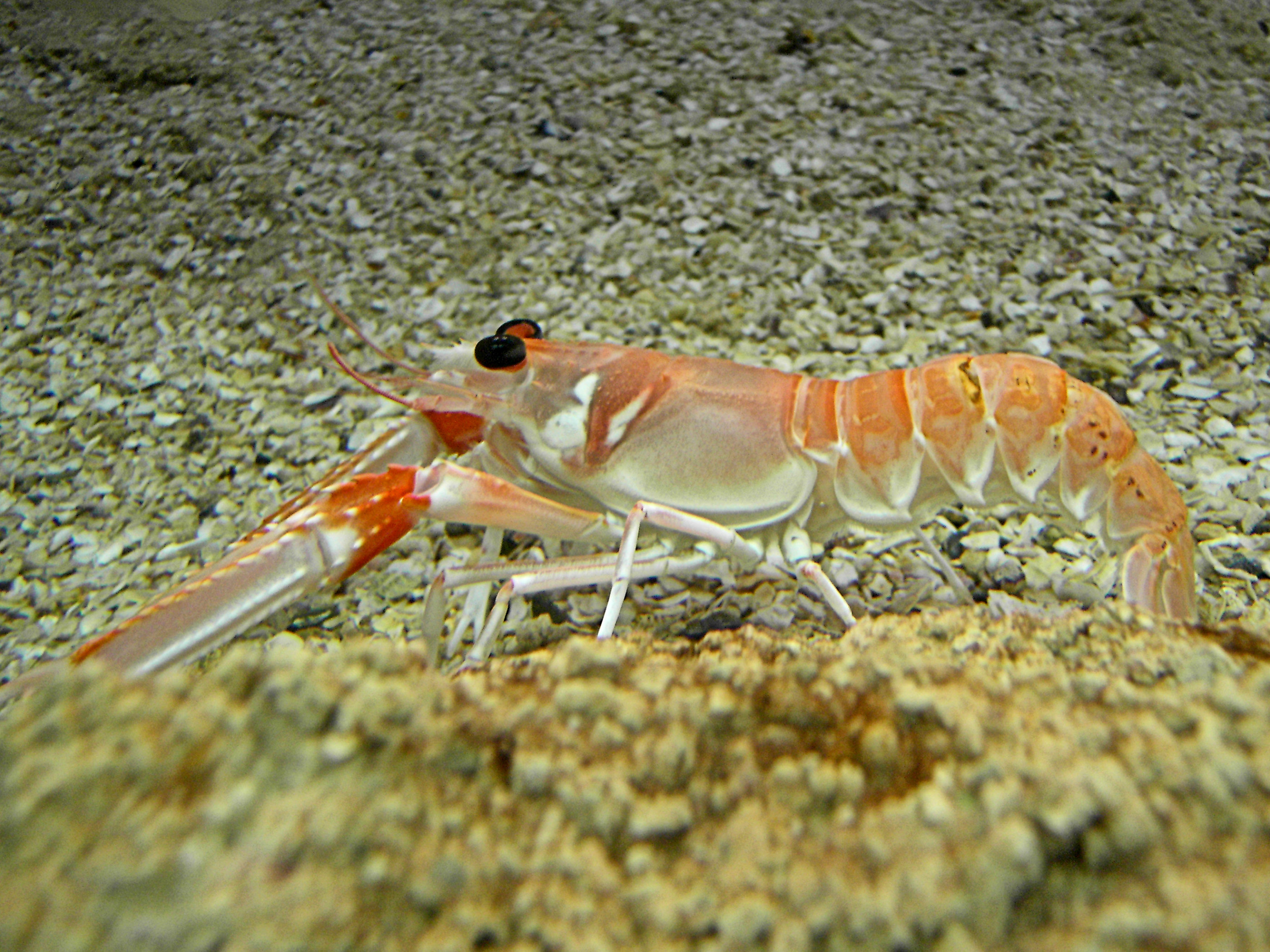
Norway lobster

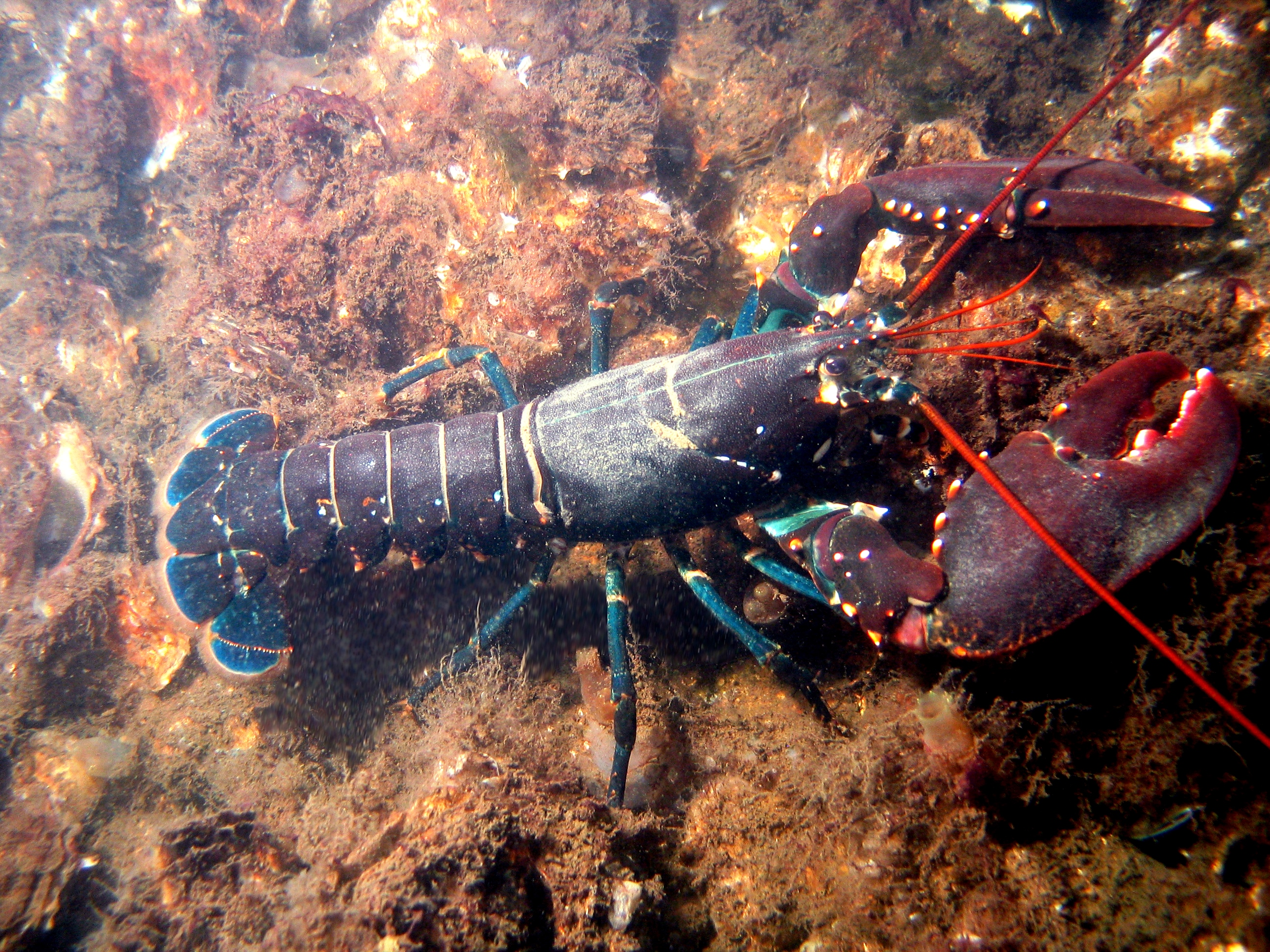
European lobster

- Acanthacaris caeca
- Eunephrops bairdii
- Eunephrops cadenasi
- Eunephrops manningi
- Homarus americanus – American lobster
- Homarus gammarus – European lobster
- Metanephrops binghami – Caribbean lobster
- Metanephrops rubellus
- Nephropides caribaeus
- Nephrops norvegicus – Norway lobster
- Nephropsis aculeata
- Nephropsis agassizii
- Nephropsis atlantica
- Nephropsis neglecta
- Nephropsis rosea
- Thaumastocheles zaleucus
- Thymops birsteini
- Thymopsis nilenta

== Hermit crabs and allies ==
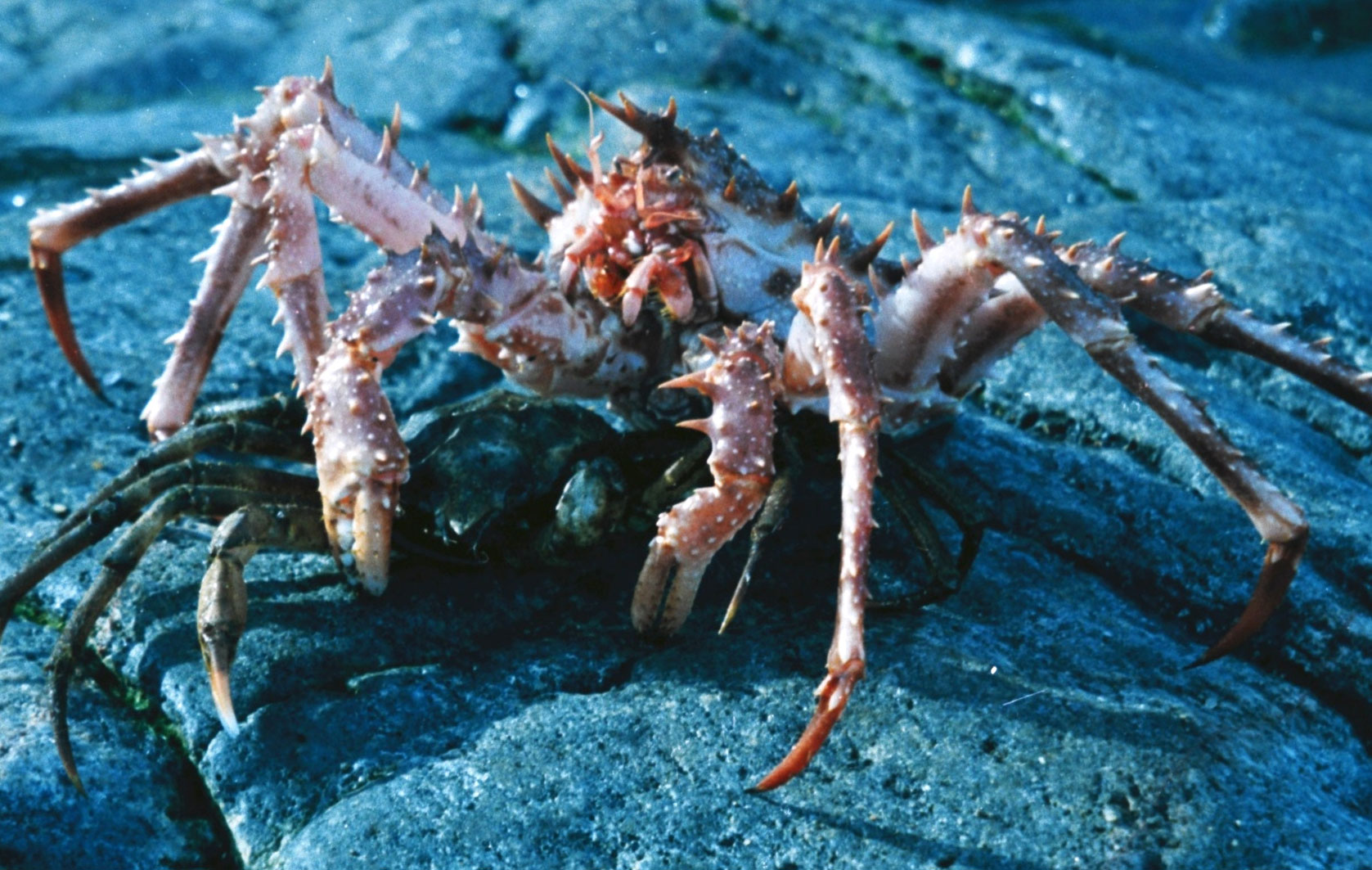
Lithodes maja

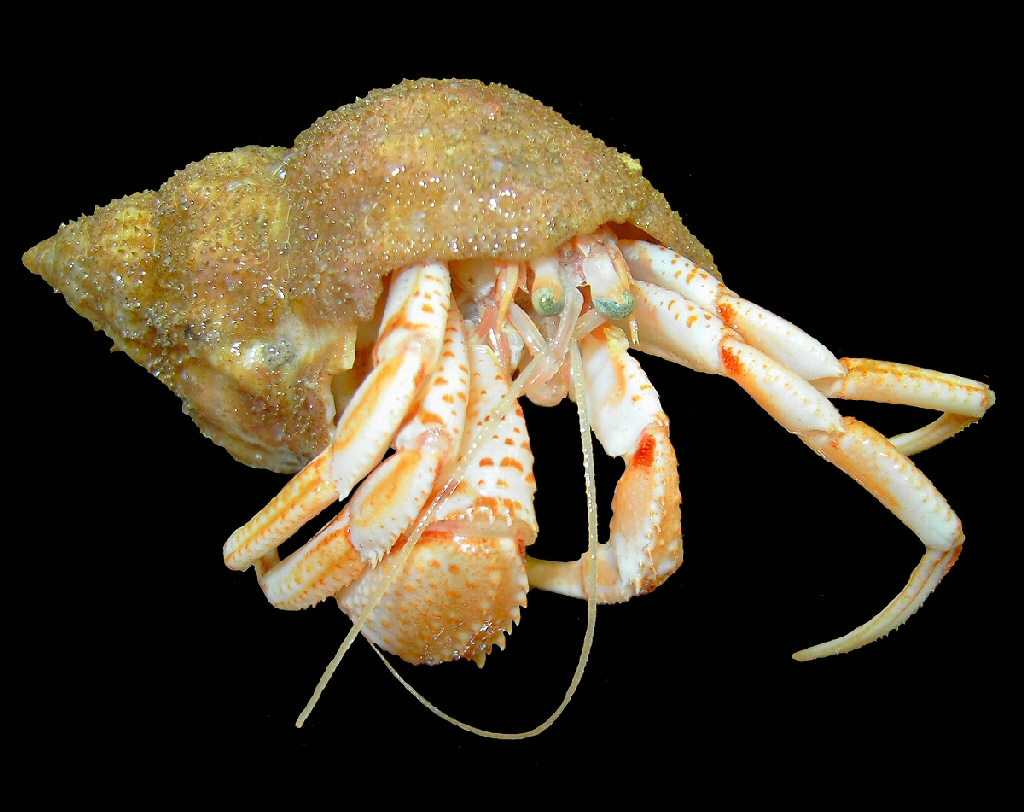
Pagurus bernhardus

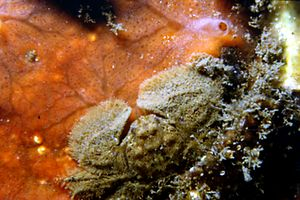
Porcellana platycheles

- Albunea catherinae
- Albunea gibbesii
- Anisopagurus hopkinsi
- Cancellus ornatus
- Catapagurus sharreri
- Clibanarius erythropus
- Clibanarius tricolor
- Clibanarius vittatus
- Dardanus fucosus
- Dardanus insignis
- Diogenes pugilator – Small hermit crab
- Emerita benedicti
- Emerita talpoida – Atlantic sand crab
- Euceramus praelongus
- Eumunida picta
- Galathea intermedia
- Galathea rostrata
- Galathea strigosa
- Goreopagurus piercei
- Hemipagurus gracilis
- Iridopagurus reticulates
- Lepidopa websteri
- Lithodes maja – Norway king crab
- Loxopagurus loxochelis
- Manucomplanus ungulatus
- Megalobrachium soriatum
- Munida angulata
- Munida forceps
- Munida iris
- Munida irrasa
- Munida longipes
- Munida pusilla
- Munida spinifrons
- Munida valida
- Pachycheles pilosus
- Pachycheles rugimanus
- Paguristes hummi
- Paguristes lymani
- Paguristes moorei
- Paguristes sericeus
- Paguristes spinipes
- Paguristes tortugae
- Paguristes triangulatus
- Pagurus acadianus
- Pagurus annulipes
- Pagurus bernhardus – European hermit crab
- Pagurus brevidactylus
- Pagurus carolinensis
- Pagurus defensus
- Pagurus impressus
- Pagurus longicarpus – long-clawed hermit crab
- Pagurus maclaughlinae
- Pagurus politus
- Pagurus pollicaris – flat-clawed hermit crab
- Pagurus prideaux
- Pagurus stimpsoni
- Paralithodes platypus – blue king crab
- Paralomis africana
- Parapagurus pilosimanus
- Petrochirus diogenes
- Petrolisthes armatus
- Petrolisthes galathinus
- Phimochirus holthuisi
- Pisidia longicornis
- Polyonyx gibbesi
- Porcellana platycheles
- Porcellana sayana
- Porcellana sigsbeiana
- Pylopagurus discoidalis
- Rhodochirus rosaceus
- Sympagurus pictus
- Tomopaguropsis problematica
- Tomopagurus cokeri
- Tomopagurus wassi

== Crabs ==
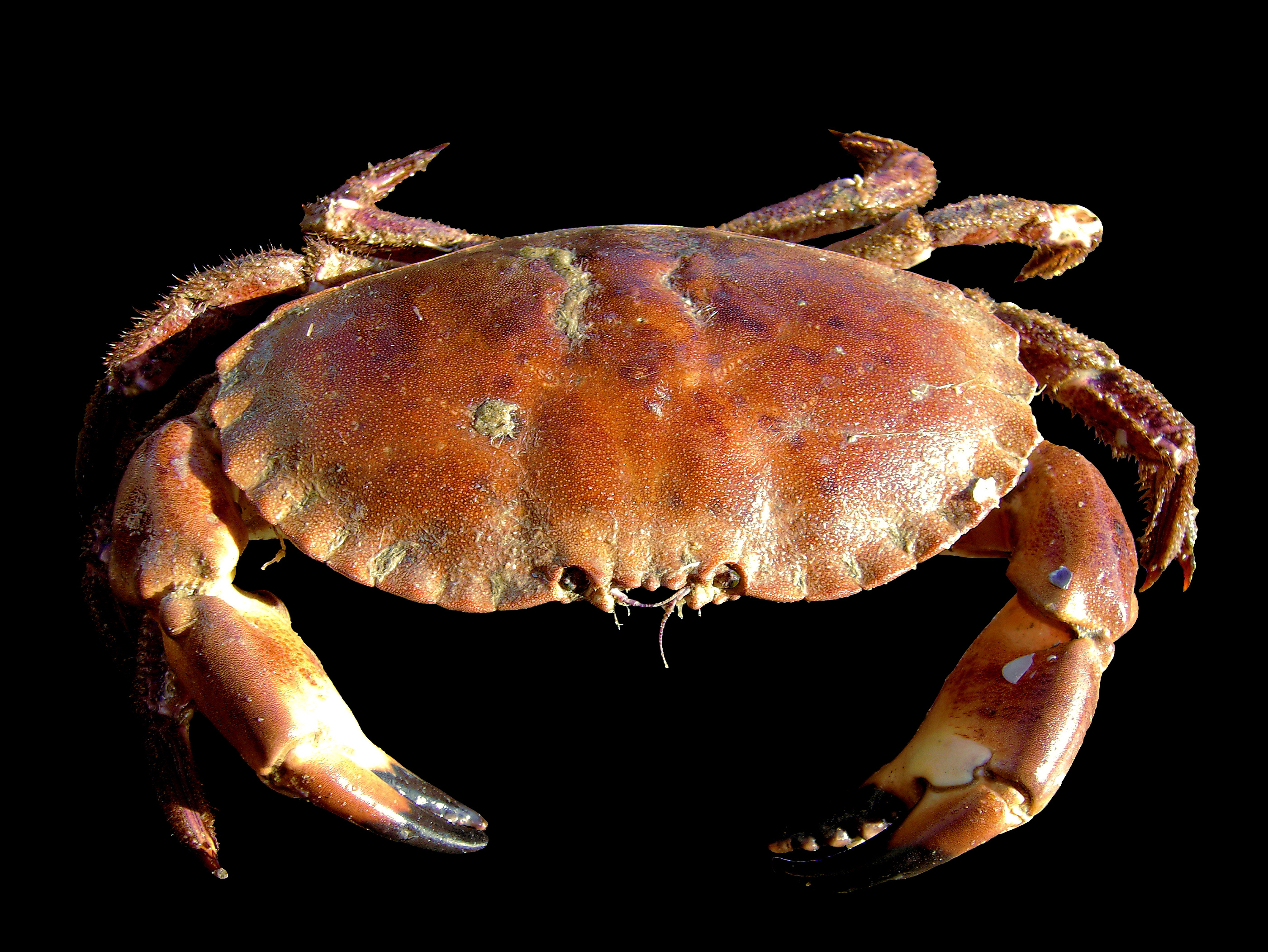
Cancer pagurus

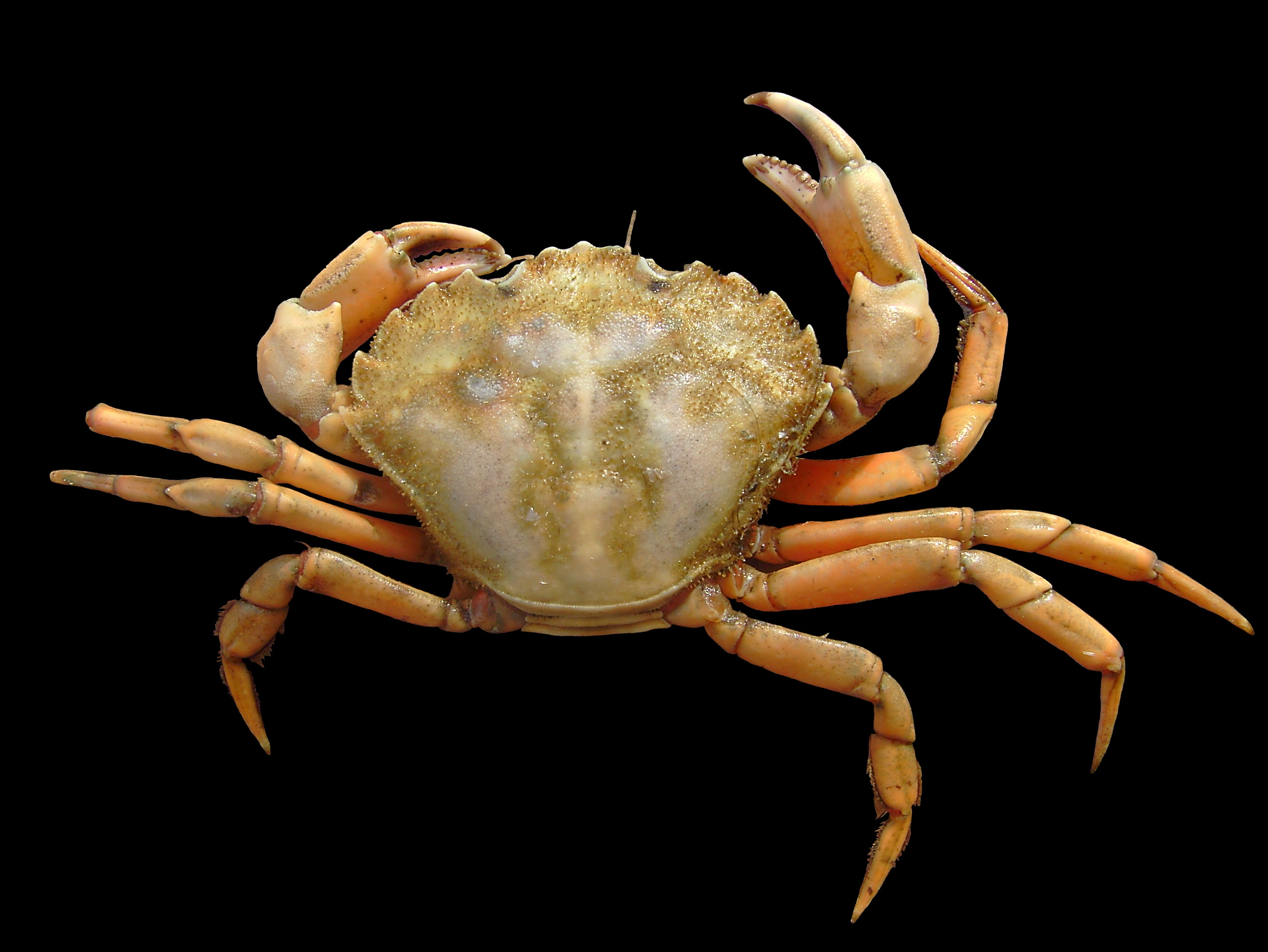
Carcinus maenas

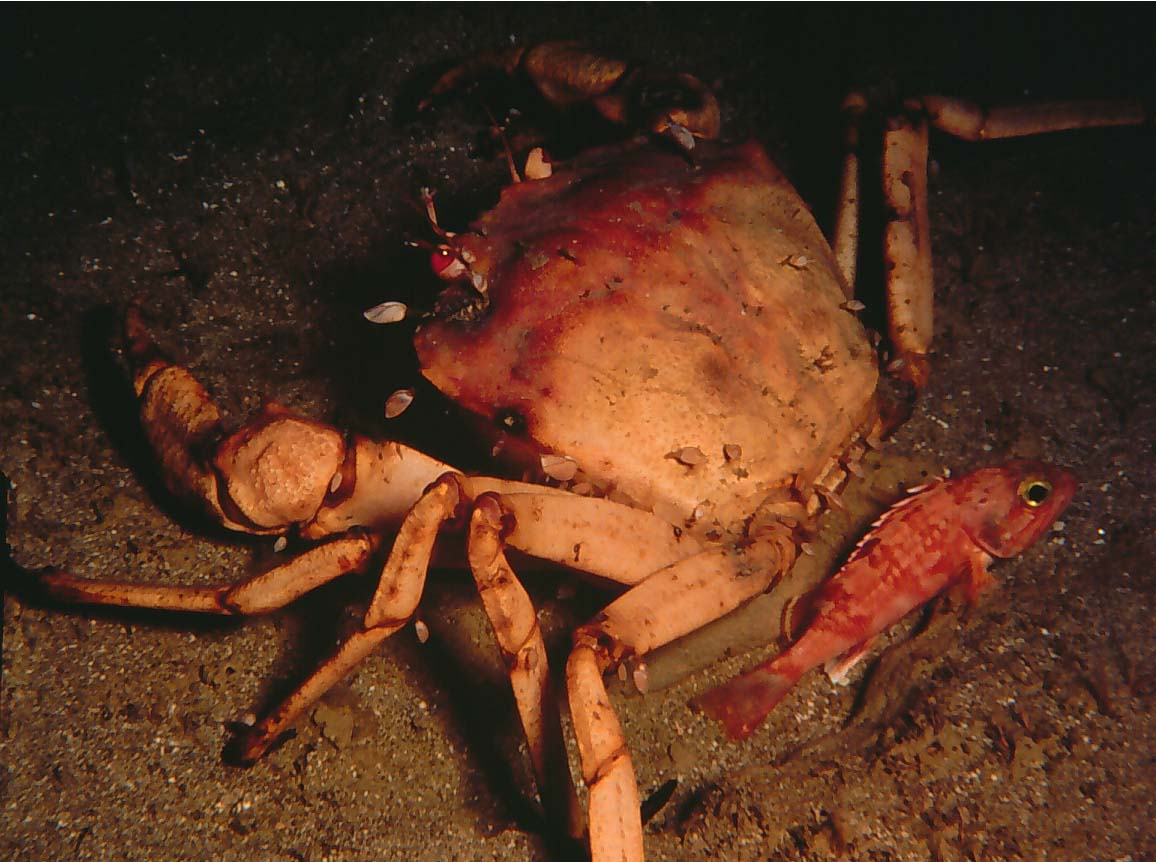
Chaceon fenneri

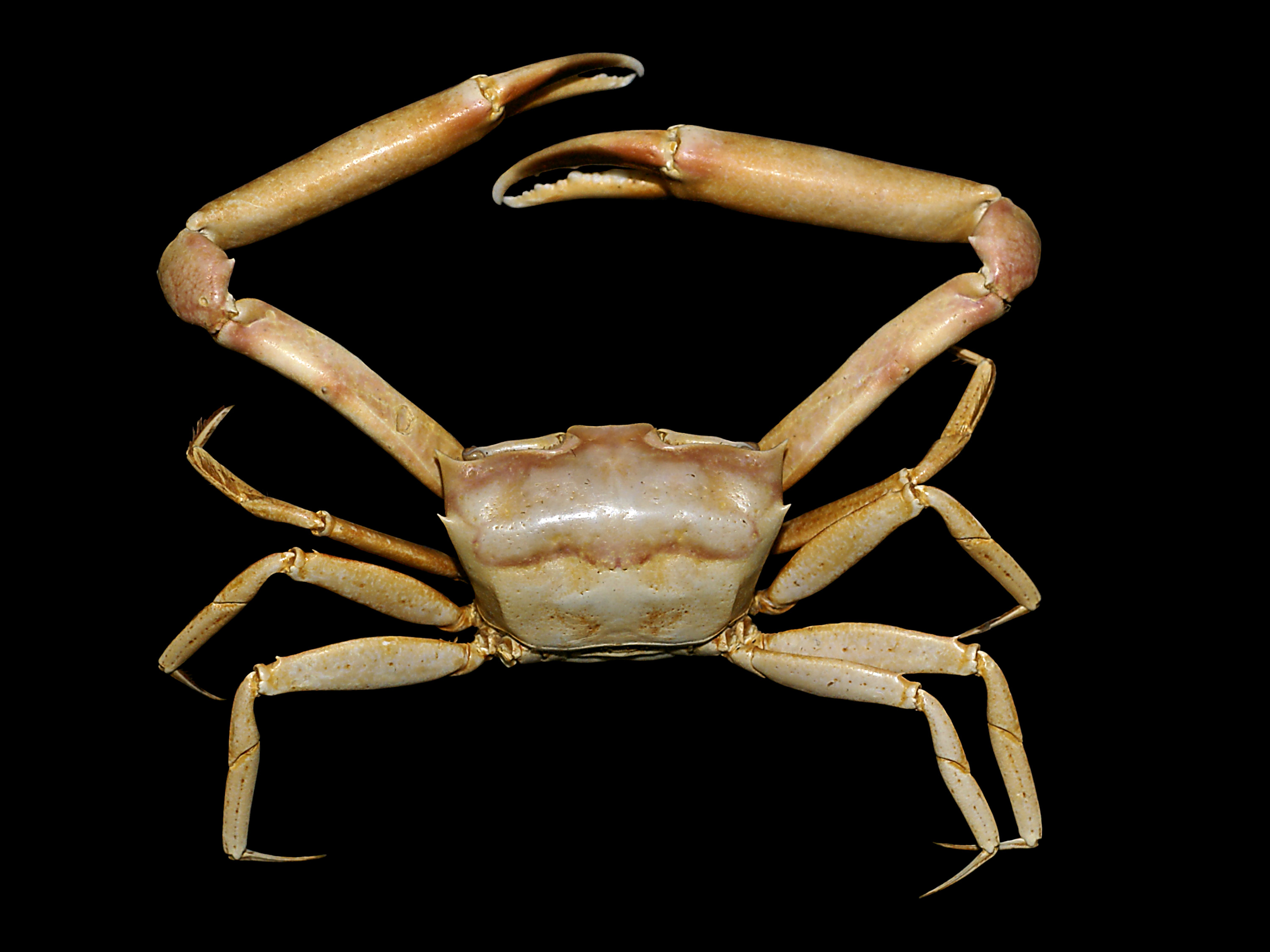
Goneplax rhomboides

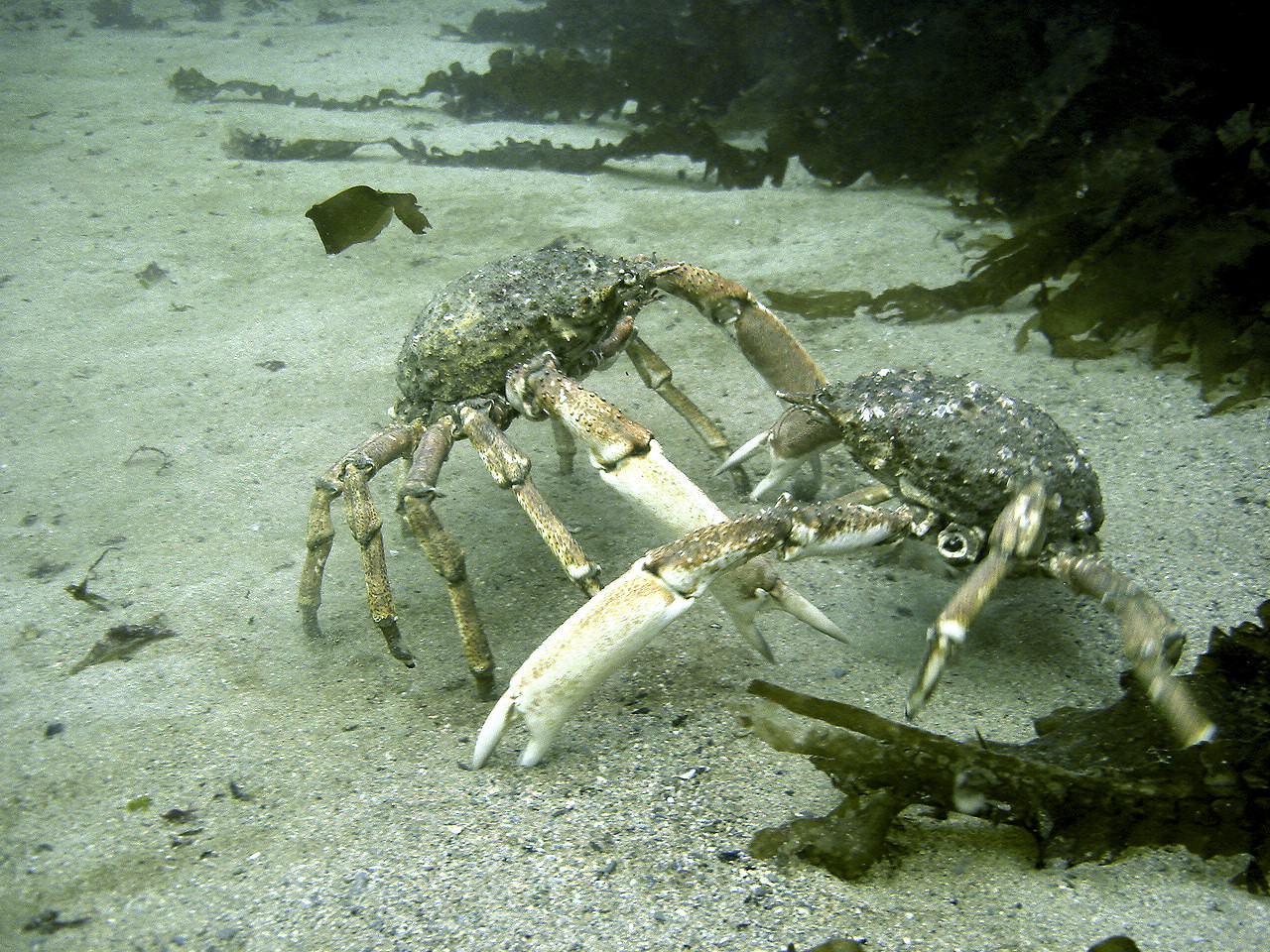
Hyas araneus

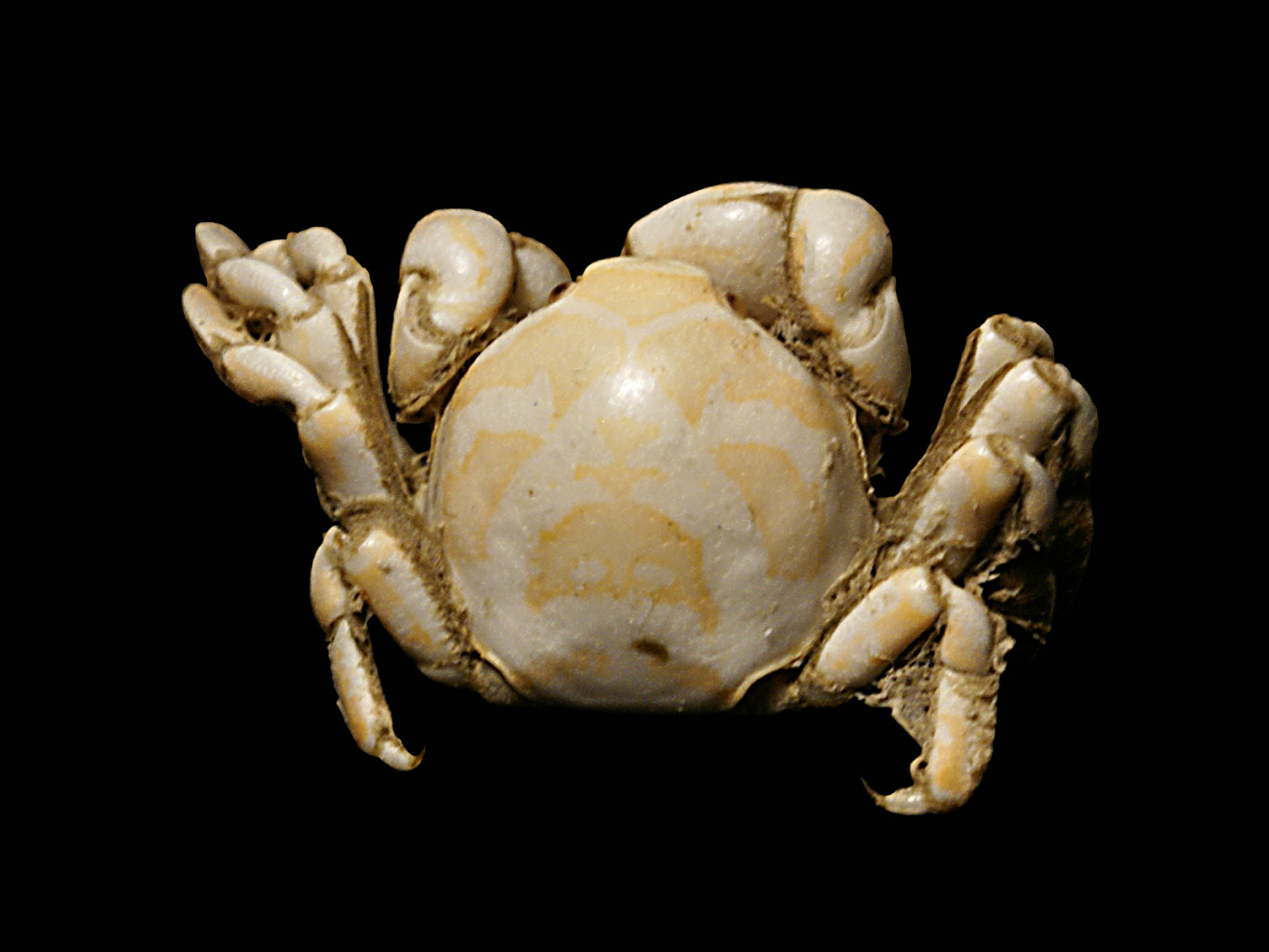
Pinnotheres pisum

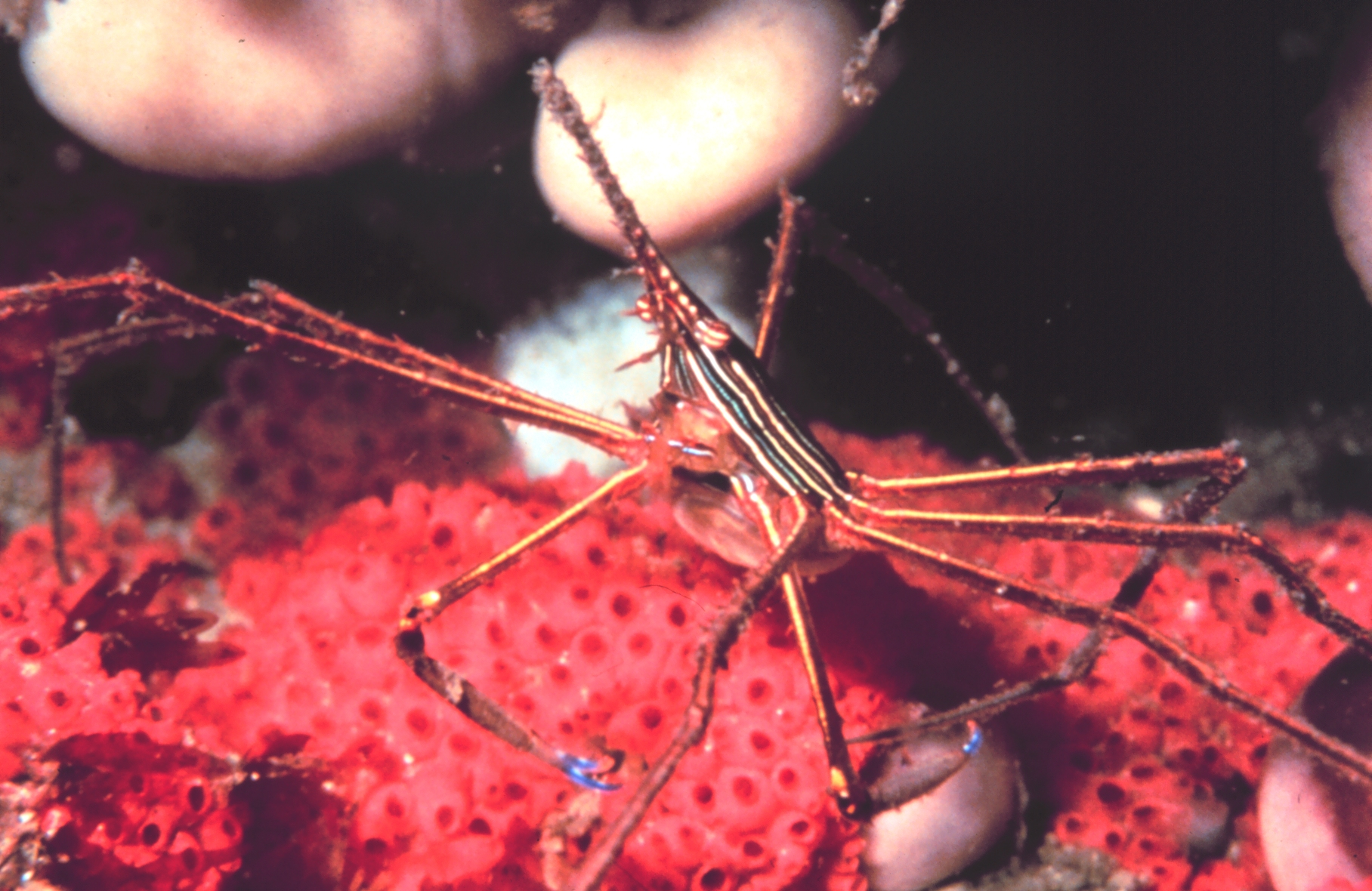
Stenorhynchus seticornis

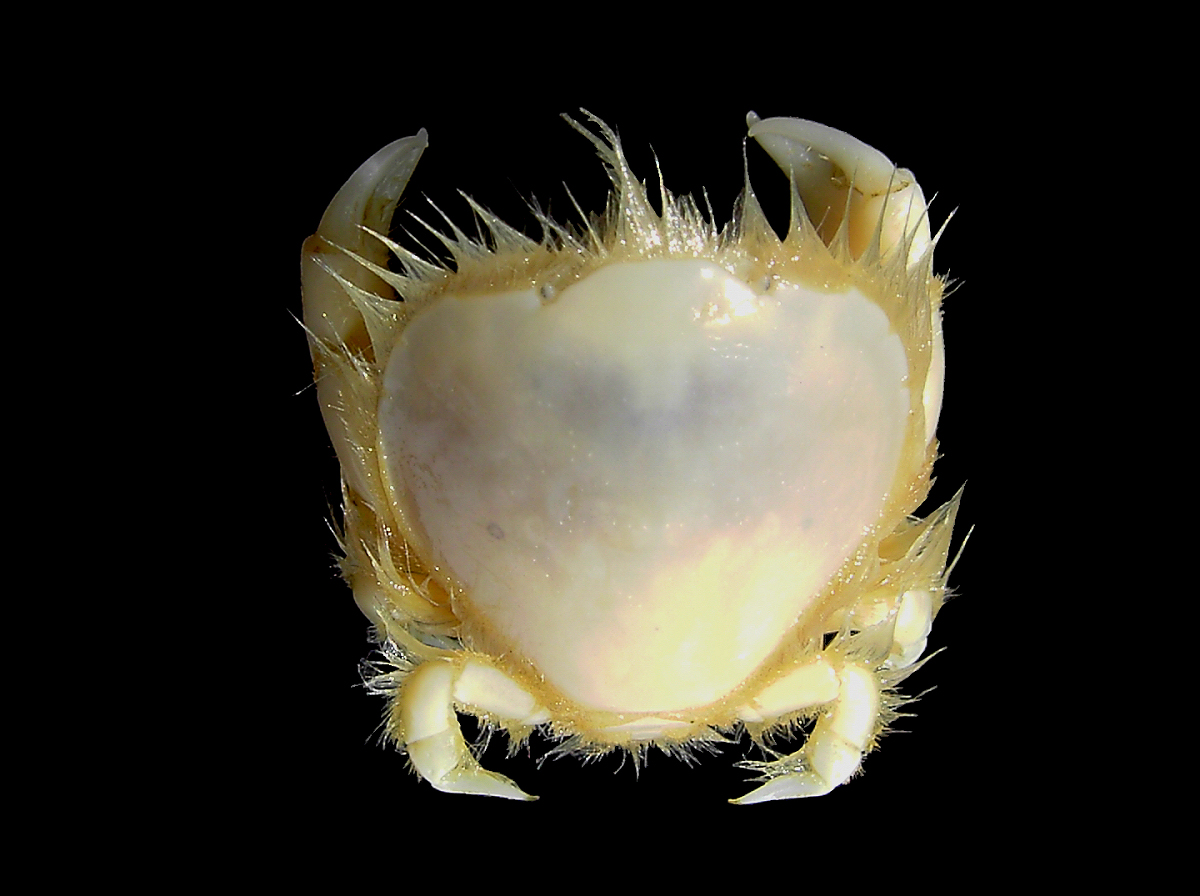
Thia scutellata

- Acanthilia intermedia
- Acanthocarpus alexandri
- Achaeus cranchii
- Aepinus septemspinosus
- Allactea lithostrota
- Anasimus latus
- Anomalothir furcillatus
- Arachnopsis filipes
- Arenaeus cribrarius
- Armases cinereum
- Atelecyclus rotundatus – circular crab
- Atelecyclus undecimdentatus
- Austinixa cristata
- Bathynectes longipes
- Bathynectes longispina
- Bathynectes maravigna
- Batrachonotus fragosus
- Bellia picta
- Calappa flammea
- Calappa ocellata
- Calappa sulcata
- Calappa tortugae
- Callidactylus asper
- Callinectes bocourti
- Callinectes danae
- Callinectes exasperatus
- Callinectes larvatus
- Callinectes marginatus – sharptooth swimcrab
- Callinectes ornatus
- Callinectes sapidus – blue crab
- Callinectes similis
- Cancer bellianus
- Cancer borealis – Jonah crab
- Cancer irroratus – Atlantic rock crab
- Cancer pagurus – edible crab
- Carcinus maenas – European shore crab
- Cardisoma guanhumi – blue land crab
- Carpoporus papulosus
- Celatopesia concava
- Chaceon fenneri – golden crab
- Clythrocerus granulatus
- Clythrocerus nitidus
- Coelocerus spinosus
- Collodes robustus
- Collodes trispinosus
- Corystes cassivelaunus
- Cronius ruber
- Cronius tumidulus
- Cryptosoma balguerii
- Cyclozodion tuberatum
- Deilocerus perpusillus
- Dissodactylus crinitichelis
- Dissodactylus mellitae
- Domecia acanthophora
- Dorhynchus thomsoni
- Dromia erythropus
- Dromia personata
- Dyspanopeus sayi
- Dyspanopeus texanus
- Ebalia cariosa
- Ebalia cranchii
- Ebalia stimpsonii
- Ebalia tuberosa
- Ebalia tumefacta
- Epialtus bituberculatus
- Epialtus dilatatus
- Eriphia gonagra
- Eriphia verrucosa
- Ethusa americana
- Ethusa microphthalma
- Ethusa tenuipes
- Euchirograpsus americanus
- Euprognatha rastellifera
- Eurynome aspera
- Eurynome spinosa
- Eurypanopeus abbreviatus
- Eurypanopeus depressus
- Euryplax nitida
- Eurytium limosum
- Frevillea hirsuta
- Gemmotheres chamae
- Geryon tridens
- Glyptoplax smithii
- Glyptoxanthus erosus
- Goneplax rhomboides
- Goneplax sigsbei
- Hemigrapsus penicillatus
- Hemus cristulipes
- Hepatus epheliticus
- Hepatus pudibundus
- Heterocrypta granulata
- Hexapanopeus angustifrons
- Hexapanopeus paulensis
- Homola barbata
- Homola minima
- Hyas araneus – great spider crab
- Hyas coarctatus
- Hypoconcha arcuata
- Hypoconcha parasitica
- Hypoconcha spinosissima
- Iliacantha subglobosa
- Inachoides forceps
- Inachus dorsettensis – scorpion spider crab
- Inachus leptochirus
- Inachus phalangium
- Latreillia elegans
- Libinia dubia
- Libinia emarginata – portly spider crab
- Liocarcinus corrugatus
- Liocarcinus depurator
- Liocarcinus holsatus
- Liocarcinus marmoreus – marbled swimming crab
- Liocarcinus navigator
- Liocarcinus pusillus
- Liocarcinus vernalis – vernal crab
- Lobopilumnus agassizii
- Lysirude nitidus
- Macrocoeloma camptocerum
- Macrocoeloma eutheca
- Macrocoeloma septemspinosum
- Macrocoeloma trispinosum
- Macropipus tuberculatus
- Macropodia deflexa
- Macropodia linaresi
- Macropodia parva
- Macropodia rostrata
- Macropodia tenuirostris
- Maja squinado – European spider crab
- Melybia thalamita
- Menippe adina – Gulf stone crab
- Menippe mercenaria – Florida stone crab
- Menippe nodifrons
- Mesorhoea sexspinosa
- Metoporhaphis calcarata
- Micropanope nuttingi
- Micropanope pusilla
- Micropanope sculptipes
- Micropanope urinator
- Microphrys antillensis
- Microphrys bicornutus
- Mithraculus forceps
- Mithraculus sculptus
- Mithrax cornutus
- Mithrax hispidus
- Mithrax spinosissimus
- Mithrax verrucosus
- Monodaeus couchi
- Moreiradromia antillensis
- Myropsis quinquespinosa
- Nanoplax xanthiformis
- Necora puber – velvet crab
- Neopanope packardii – Florida grassflat crab
- Neopilumnoplax americana
- Nibilia antilocapra
- Ocypode quadrata – Atlantic ghost crab
- Osachila semilevis
- Osachila tuberosa
- Ovalipes ocellatus – lady crab
- Ovalipes stephensoni
- Pachygrapsus transversus
- Palicus alternatus
- Palicus faxoni
- Palicus sica
- Panopeus herbstii – Atlantic mud crab
- Panopeus obesus
- Panopeus occidentalis
- Panoplax depressa
- Paractaea rufopunctata
- Parapinnixa bouvieri
- Parapinnixa hendersoni
- Paromola cuvieri
- Parthenope agona
- Pelia mutica
- Percnon gibbesi
- Persephona mediterranea
- Pilumnus dasypodus
- Pilumnus floridanus
- Pilumnus hirtellus
- Pilumnus lacteus
- Pilumnus pannosus
- Pilumnus sayi
- Pilumnus spinifer
- Pinnaxodes floridensis
- Pinnixa chaetopterana
- Pinnixa cylindrica
- Pinnixa floridana
- Pinnixa lunzi
- Pinnixa retinens
- Pinnixa sayana
- Pinnotheres pinnotheres
- Pinnotheres pisum – pea crab
- Pirimela denticulata
- Pisa armata
- Pisa tetraodon
- Pitho lherminieri
- Plagusia depressa
- Planes minutus
- Platylambrus fraterculus
- Platylambrus granulata
- Platylambrus pourtalesii
- Platylambrus serratus
- Podochela gracilipes
- Podochela riisei
- Podochela sidneyi
- Polybius henslowii
- Portumnus latipes
- Portunus anceps
- Portunus depressifrons
- Portunus floridanus
- Portunus gibbesii
- Portunus ordwayi
- Portunus sayi
- Portunus spinicarpus
- Achelous spinimanus
- Portunus ventralis
- Pseudomedaeus agassizii
- Pseudomedaeus distinctus
- Pyromaia arachna
- Pyromaia cuspidata
- Ranilia constricta
- Ranilia muricata
- Raninoides loevis
- Rhithropanopeus harrisii – white-tipped mud crab
- Rochinia crassa
- Rochinia tanneri
- Rochinia umbonata
- Sesarma reticulatum – heavy marsh crab
- Solenolambrus tenellus
- Solenolambrus typicus
- Speloeophorus elevatus
- Speloeophorus nodosus
- Speloeophorus pontifer
- Speocarcinus carolinensis – Carolinian squareback crab
- Sphenocarcinus corrosus
- Stenocionops furcata
- Stenocionops furcata
- Stenocionops spinimana
- Stenocionops spinosissima
- Stenorhynchus seticornis
- Stenorhynchus yangi
- Symethis variolosa
- Tetraxanthus rathbunae
- Thalassoplax angusta
- Thia scutellata – thumbnail crab
- Tumidotheres maculatus
- Tyche emarginata
- Uca minax
- Uca pugilator
- Uca pugnax
- Uca tangeri
- Uhlias limbatus
- Xaiva biguttata
- Xantho hydrophilus
- Xantho pilipes
- Xantho poressa
- Xantho sexdentatus
- Zaops ostreum – oyster crab
