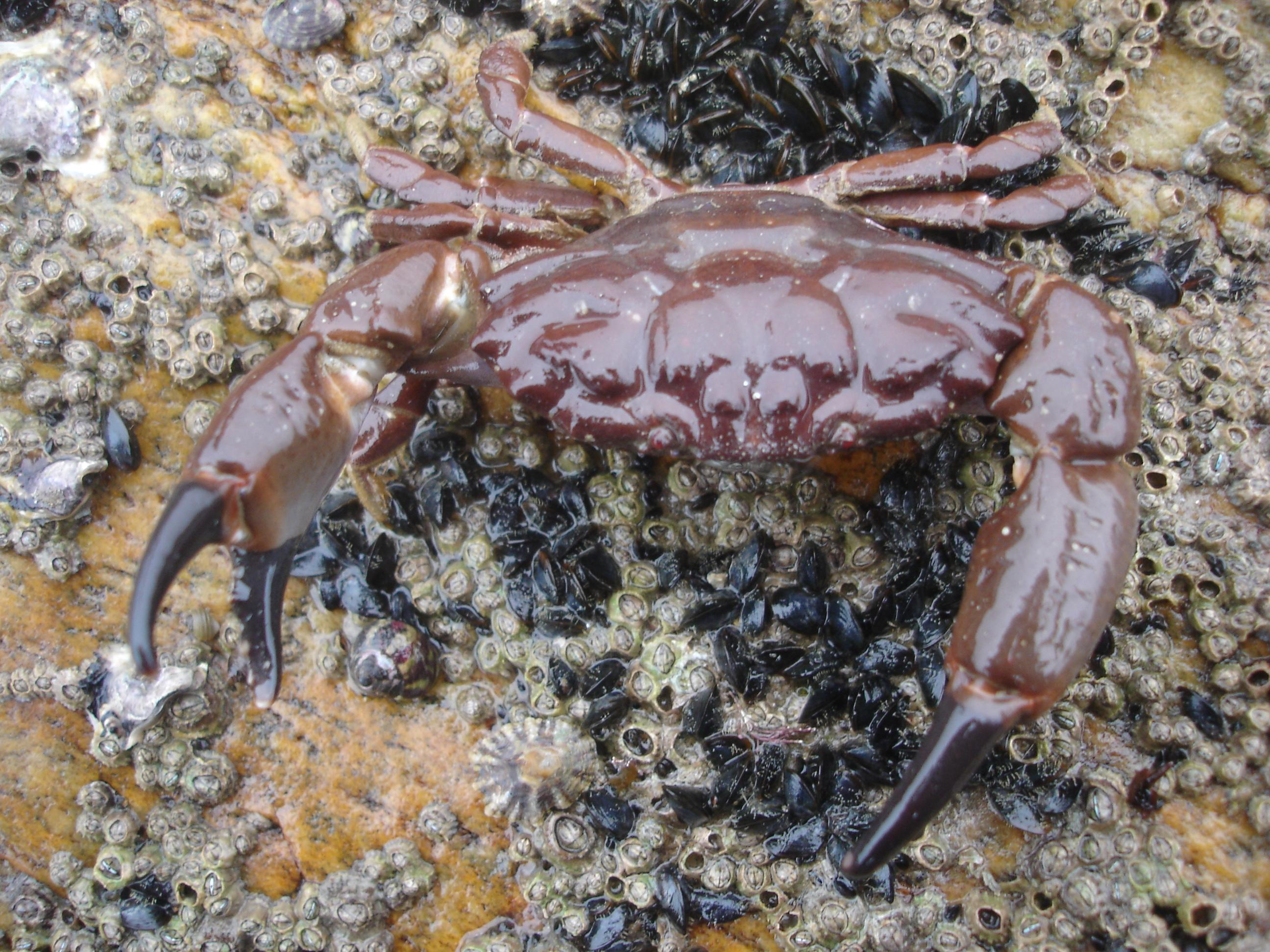

Scientific classification
- Kingdom: Animalia
- Phylum: Arthropoda
- Class: Malacostraca
- Order: Decapoda
- Suborder: Pleocyemata
- Infraorder: Brachyura
- Family: Xanthidae
- Genus: Xantho
- Species: X. hydrophilus

Binomial name
- Xantho hydrophilus (Herbst, 1790)

Synonyms
- Cancer floridus Montagu, 1808; Cancer hydrophilus Herbst, 1790; Cancer incisus Leach, 1814; Xantho incisus (Leach, 1814)

= Xantho hydrophilus =

Species of crab

Xantho hydrophilus, the furrowed crab or Montagu's crab, is a species of crab from the family Xanthidae. It is yellowish-brown and grows to a carapace width of 70 mm (2.8 in). It is a nocturnal omnivore that lives in shallow marine waters from western Scotland to the Cape Verde Islands.

== Description ==
The carapace of Xantho hydrophilus reaches a width of 70 millimetres (2.8 in), and a length of up to 22 mm (0.9 in). The dorsal surface of the carapace has a smooth appearance to the unaided eye but on closer examination it can be seen to be finely granular. The antero-lateral edge of the carapace bears five blunt lobes. The chelipeds are large and robust and equal in size and lack spines or tubercles, the pereiopods (walking legs) are relatively short and rather stout. It is yellowish-brown, except for the tips of the chelae, which are black. X. hydrophilus closely resembles X. pilipes, from which it can be distinguished by the absence of fringes of setae on the second to fifth pairs of pereiopods (walking legs). Other key identification features are that the second to fourth pairs of antero-lateral lobes are separated from each other by an inward pointing, wide and shallow depression, the postero-lateral margins of the carapace are bristly and the inner surfaces of the propodus has a broad, longitudinal pitted cavity.

== Ecology ==
Xantho hydrophilus lives under stones on sandy and stony beaches, below the intertidal zone, up to a depth of 40 metres (130 ft), although it can be found in rock pools at low tide. It is an omnivore which feeds chiefly on various algae, but also scavenges and is mostly active at night. When disturbed it spreads out its large chelipeds to make itself seem bigger.

Mating takes place in spring, and the females carry the fertilised eggs on their pleopods from March to July; the larvae can be found in the plankton over most of the summer.

== Distribution ==
Xantho hydrophilus is found from the Mediterranean Sea, the Cape Verde Islands, the Azores and the Canary Islands in the south, north to the western and southern coasts of the British Isles, reaching its northern limit in western Scotland.

=== Taxonomy ===
The populations in the Mediterranean Sea have been recognised as a separate taxon, initially as the subspecies Xantho hydrophilus granulimanus, but also as the species Xantho granulimanus. However, other work has shown that while the populations in the north-eastern Atlantic (Brittany) and eastern Mediterranean (Greece) show wide genetic differentiation, populations in the south eastern Atlantic (Portugal) and the western Mediterranean (Ibiza) are intermediate suggesting gene flow between the different parts of the range. These authors do not recognise Xantho hydrophilus granulimanus as a separate taxon, regarding X. hydrophilus as a monotypic species.

== Nomenclature ==
Xantho hydrophilus was first described by Johann Friedrich Wilhelm Herbst in 1790, under the name Cancer hydrophilus. It was later described under the name Cancer floridus by George Montagu (1808) and under the name Cancer incisus by William Elford Leach (1814). Confusingly, it has also been referred to by names of other taxa, such as Xantho poressa and Xantho pilipes.

A crab species from the Indo-Pacific was described in 1834 as "Xantho incisus" by Henri Milne-Edwards; that species is now known as Lophozozymus incisus.
