= Eunephrops luckhursti =

Conservation status
- Data Deficient (IUCN 3.1)

Scientific classification
- Kingdom: Animalia
- Phylum: Arthropoda
- Clade: Pancrustacea
- Class: Malacostraca
- Order: Decapoda
- Suborder: Pleocyemata
- Family: Nephropidae
- Genus: Eunephrops
- Species: E. luckhursti

Binomial name
- Eunephrops luckhursti Manning, 1997

Species of lobster

Eunephrops luckhursti is a species of deep-sea nephropid lobster, one of four species in the genus Eunephrops. It is found in benthic habitats off Bermuda. It can grow up to 170 mm (6.7 in) and is covered in conspicuous tubercles.

== Description ==
Eunephrops luckhursti is a deep-sea lobster with large chelae (claws) and a carapace covered in small tubercles, which are more pronounced towards the front of the body. Its rostrum extends past its antennular peduncle, and is very smooth with very few serrations. It has short scaphocerites (antennal scales), and the abdominal segments have a distinct ridge along the top and sharply pointed sides. The claws are large and extend forward past the head and are covered in tubercles. The carapace and claws are red in color, while the legs may appear pink or translucent. Only a small number of species have ever been collected, with the largest observed reaching 170mm in total length.

== Distribution and ecology ==
Eunephrops luckhursti has only been observed in the waters surrounding Bermuda in the Northwestern Atlantic Ocean. it is a deep-water species, living on muddy bottoms at depths of 800–824 metres (2,625–2,703 ft).

The ecology of Eunephrops luckhursti is not well documented, and little information is available on its behavior or diet. However, studies of similar deep sea nephropid lobsters suggests that they are benthic predators and scavengers. They are likely opportunistic feeders that feed on a wide variety of prey like crustaceans, fish, and other organic material.

== Discovery ==
Eunephrops luckhursti was discovered during an exploratory deep-water trapping operation conducted by John P. Ingham and Brian Luckhurst off Bermuda. The traps were baited with fish and deployed across a range of depths west and south of the Bermuda platform. The species was later described by Raymond B. Manning in 1997.

== Taxonomy ==
Eunephrops luckhursti was first described by Raymond B. Manning in 1997. It belongs to the genus Eunephrops, a group of deep-sea lobster found in the western Atlantic, and was recognized as fourth species in the genus at the time of its description.

The species is most similar to E. cadenasi; however, it has shorter antennal scales and sharper abdominal segments.

The species name luckhursti honors Brian Luckhurst, a fisheries scientist involved in its discovery.
