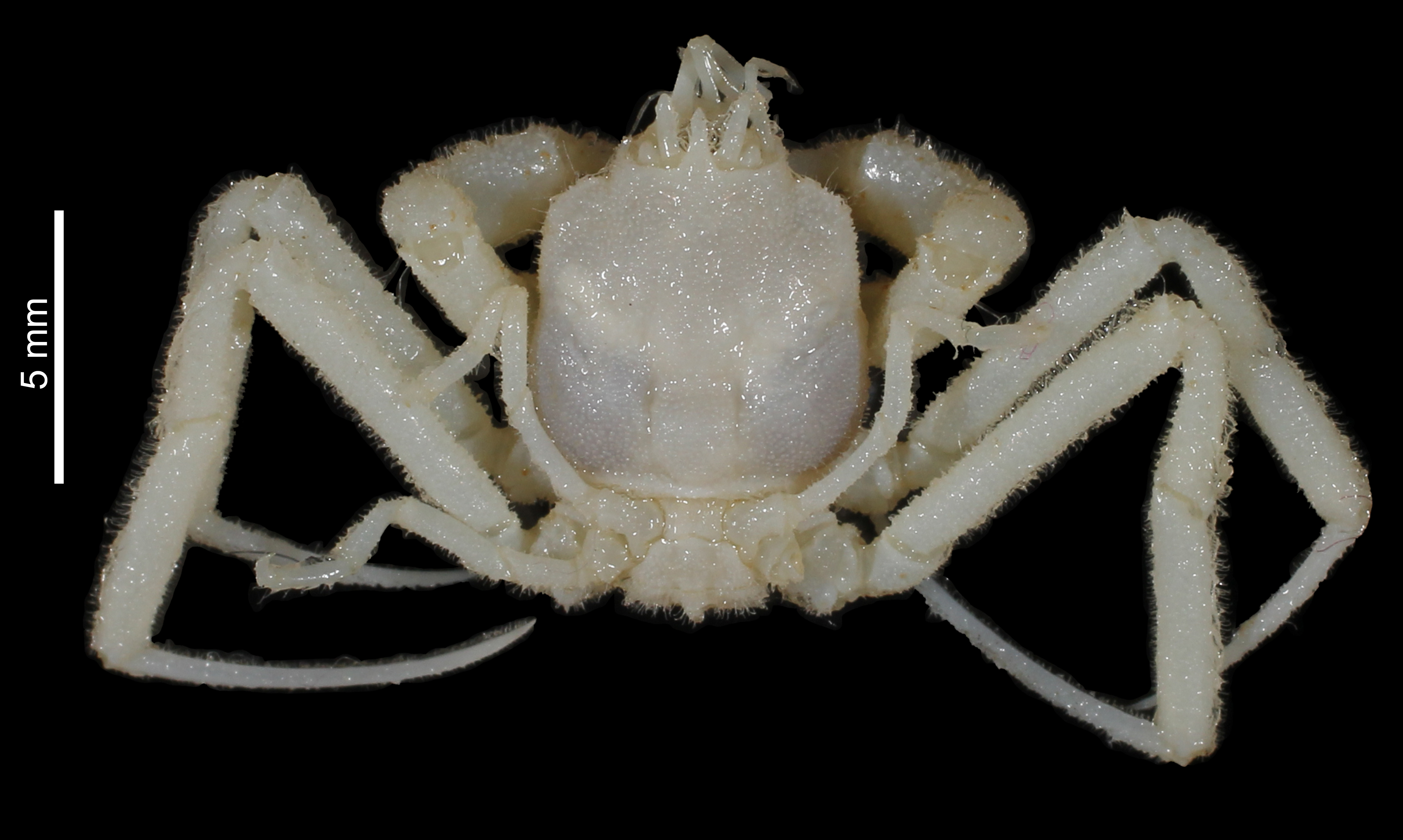
- Cymonomus leblondi

Scientific classification
- Domain: Eukaryota
- Kingdom: Animalia
- Phylum: Arthropoda
- Class: Malacostraca
- Order: Decapoda
- Suborder: Pleocyemata
- Infraorder: Brachyura
- Section: Cyclodorippoida
- Superfamily: Cyclodorippoidea
- Family: Cymonomidae; Bouvier, 1898

= Cymonomidae =

Family of crabs

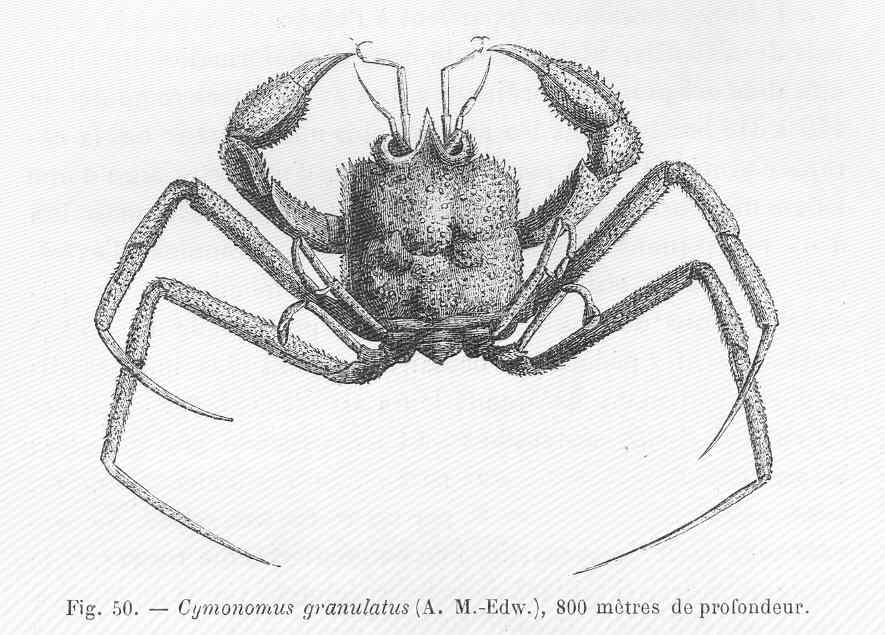

Cymonomidae is a family of crustaceans belonging to the order Decapoda.

Genera:

- Curupironomus Tavares, 1993
- Cymonomoides Tavares, 1993
- Cymonomus Milne-Edwards, 1880
- Cymopolus Milne-Edwards, 1880
- Elassopodus Tavares, 1993
