= Clythrocerus =

Scientific classification
- Domain: Eukaryota
- Kingdom: Animalia
- Phylum: Arthropoda
- Class: Malacostraca
- Order: Decapoda
- Suborder: Pleocyemata
- Infraorder: Brachyura
- Section: Cyclodorippoida
- Superfamily: Cyclodorippoidea
- Family: Cyclodorippidae
- Genus: Clythrocerus; A. Milne-Edwards & Bouvier, 1899

Type species
- Cyclodorippe nitida A. Milne-Edwards, 1880

Genus of crustaceans

Clythrocerus is a genus of brachyuran crab known from the Gulf of Mexico and western portions of the Atlantic Ocean. It currently includes four species: C. stimpsoni, C. granulatus, C. perpusillus, and C. nitidus.

Cladogram from the Catalogue of Life:

- Cyclodorippidae
  - Clythrocerus
    - Clythrocerus granulatus
    - Clythrocerus nitidus
  - Cyclodorippe
  - Deilocerus
  - Neocorycodus
