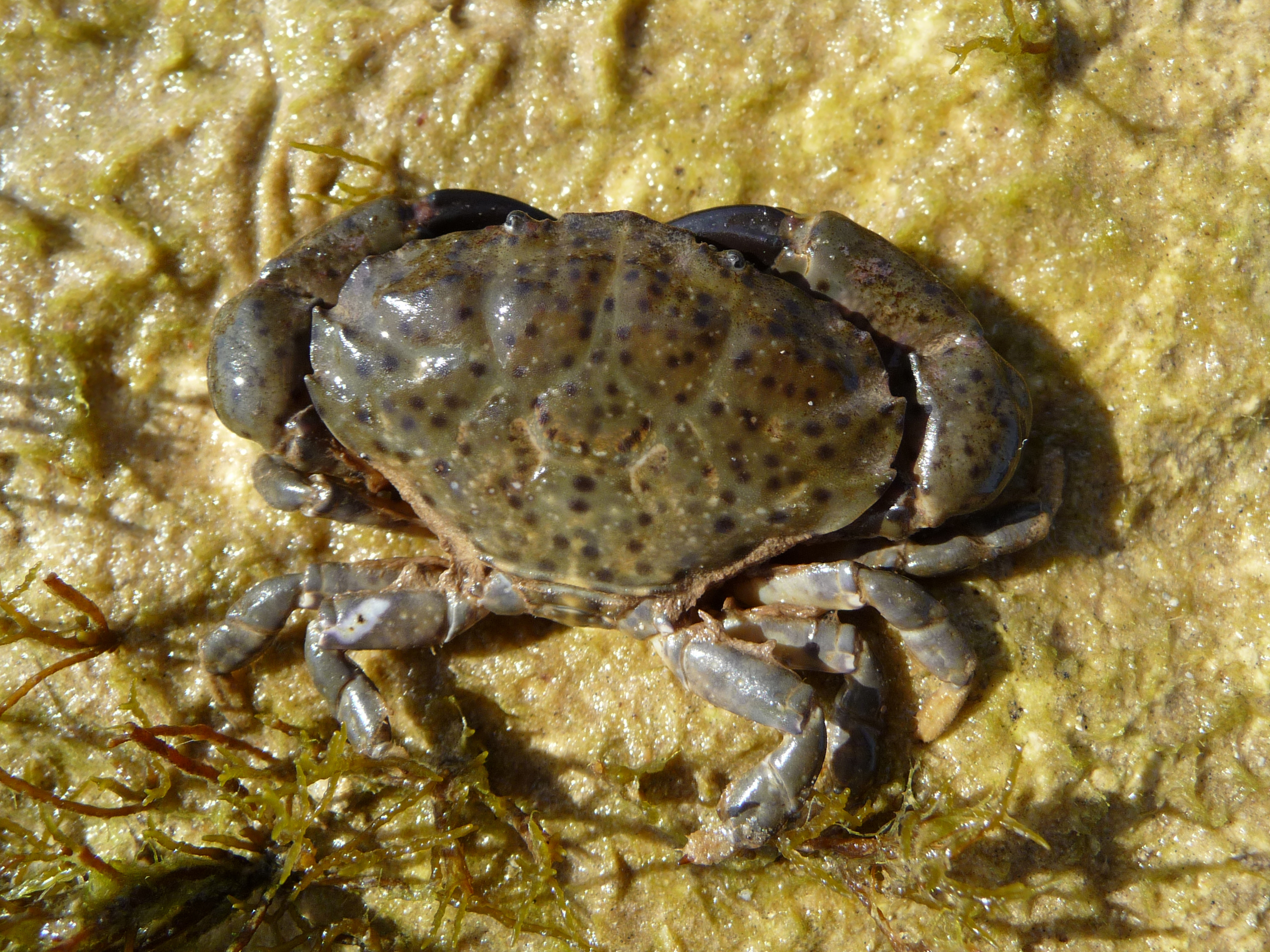
- Xantho poressa

Scientific classification
- Kingdom: Animalia
- Phylum: Arthropoda
- Class: Malacostraca
- Order: Decapoda
- Suborder: Pleocyemata
- Infraorder: Brachyura
- Family: Xanthidae
- Genus: Xantho; Leach, 1814

Type species
- Xantho hydrophilus Leach, 1814

Species
- See text

= Xantho =

Genus of crabs

Xantho is a genus of crabs in the family Xanthidae, containing five extant species, all restricted to the north-east Atlantic Ocean and Mediterranean Sea, although Xantho granulicarpis is not universally recognised as a separate species from Xantho hydrophilus:

- Xantho granulicarpus Forest, 1953
- Xantho hydrophilus (Herbst, 1790)
- Xantho pilipes A. Milne-Edwards, 1867
- Xantho poressa (Olivi, 1792)
- Xantho sexdentatus (Miers, 1881)

Five species are known from the fossil record, including one species that is still extant.
