= Eunephrops =

Scientific classification
- Kingdom: Animalia
- Phylum: Arthropoda
- Class: Malacostraca
- Order: Decapoda
- Suborder: Pleocyemata
- Family: Nephropidae
- Genus: Eunephrops; S. I. Smith, 1885

Type species
- Eunephrops bairdii S. I. Smith, 1885

Species
- See text

Genus of lobsters

Eunephrops is a genus of lobsters, containing four species, all found in the Western Atlantic Ocean:

- Eunephrops bairdii Smith, 1885
- Eunephrops cadenasi Chace, 1939
- Eunephrops luckhursti Manning, 1997
- Eunephrops manningi Holthuis, 1974
