= Periclimenaeus bredini =

Scientific classification
- Kingdom: Animalia
- Phylum: Arthropoda
- Clade: Pancrustacea
- Class: Malacostraca
- Order: Decapoda
- Suborder: Pleocyemata
- Infraorder: Caridea
- Family: Palaemonidae
- Genus: Periclimenaeus
- Species: P. bredini

Binomial name
- Periclimenaeus bredini Chace, 1972

Species of shrimp

Periclimenaeus bredini is a species of shrimp of the family Palaemonidae. Periclimenaeus bredini is found in the Gulf of Mexico.
