= Periclimenaeus maxillulidens =

Scientific classification
- Kingdom: Animalia
- Phylum: Arthropoda
- Clade: Pancrustacea
- Class: Malacostraca
- Order: Decapoda
- Suborder: Pleocyemata
- Infraorder: Caridea
- Family: Palaemonidae
- Genus: Periclimenaeus
- Species: P. maxillulidens

Binomial name
- Periclimenaeus maxillulidens Schmitt, 1936

Species of shrimp

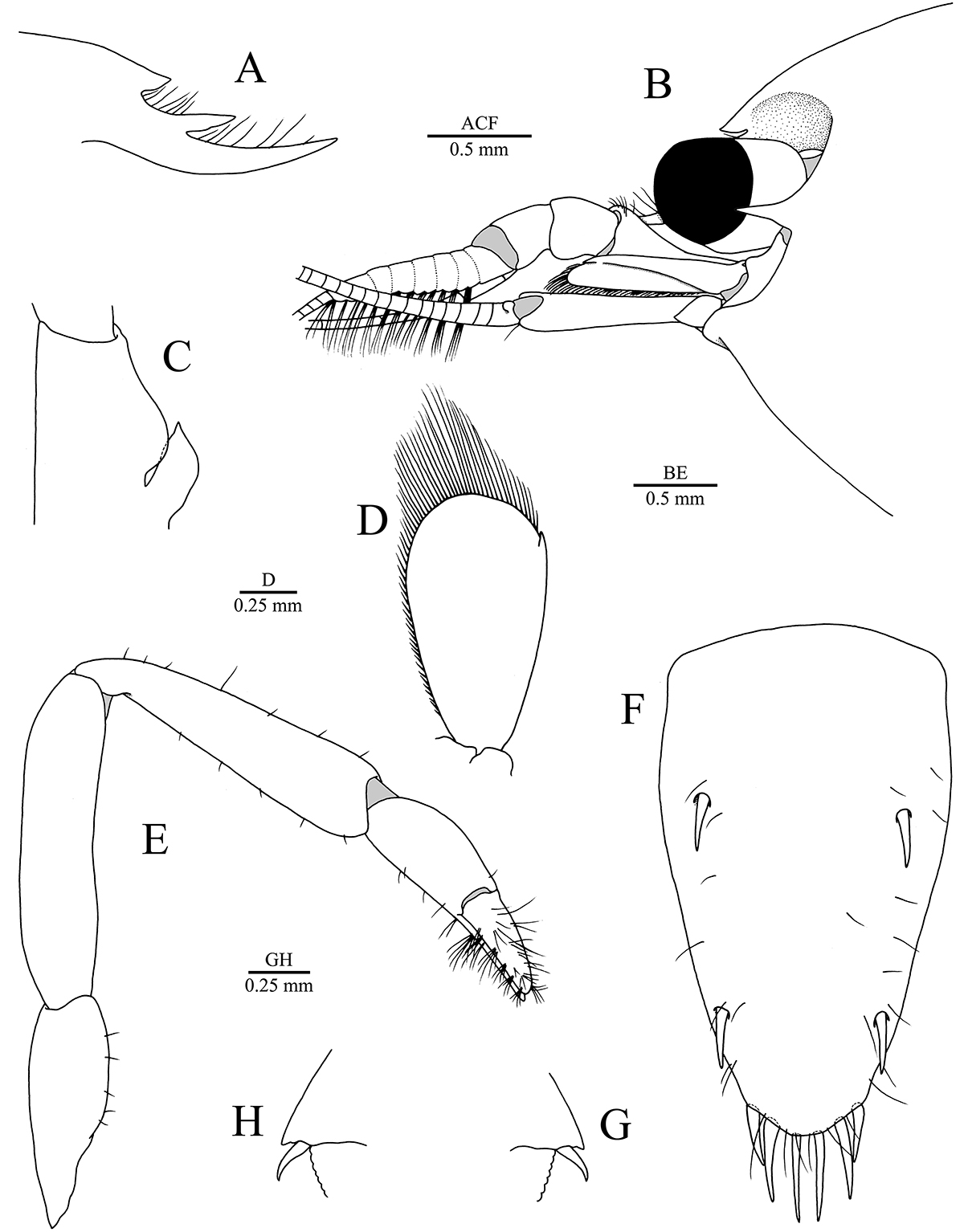
Periclimenaeus maxillulidens (Schmitt, 1936), ovigerous female, 3.7 mm CL, MZUSP 39108: (A) rostrum, lateral view; (B) frontal margin and cephalic appendages, lateral view; (C) right antennule, first article of peduncle, dorsal view; (D) right scaphocerite, dorsal view; (E) right first pereopod, lateral view; (F) telson, dorsal view; (G, H) right and left uropods, respectively, diaeresis, dorsal view.

Periclimenaeus maxillulidens is a species of shrimp of the family Palaemonidae. Periclimenaeus maxillulidens is found off the coasts of Florida, Panama, and Mexico.
