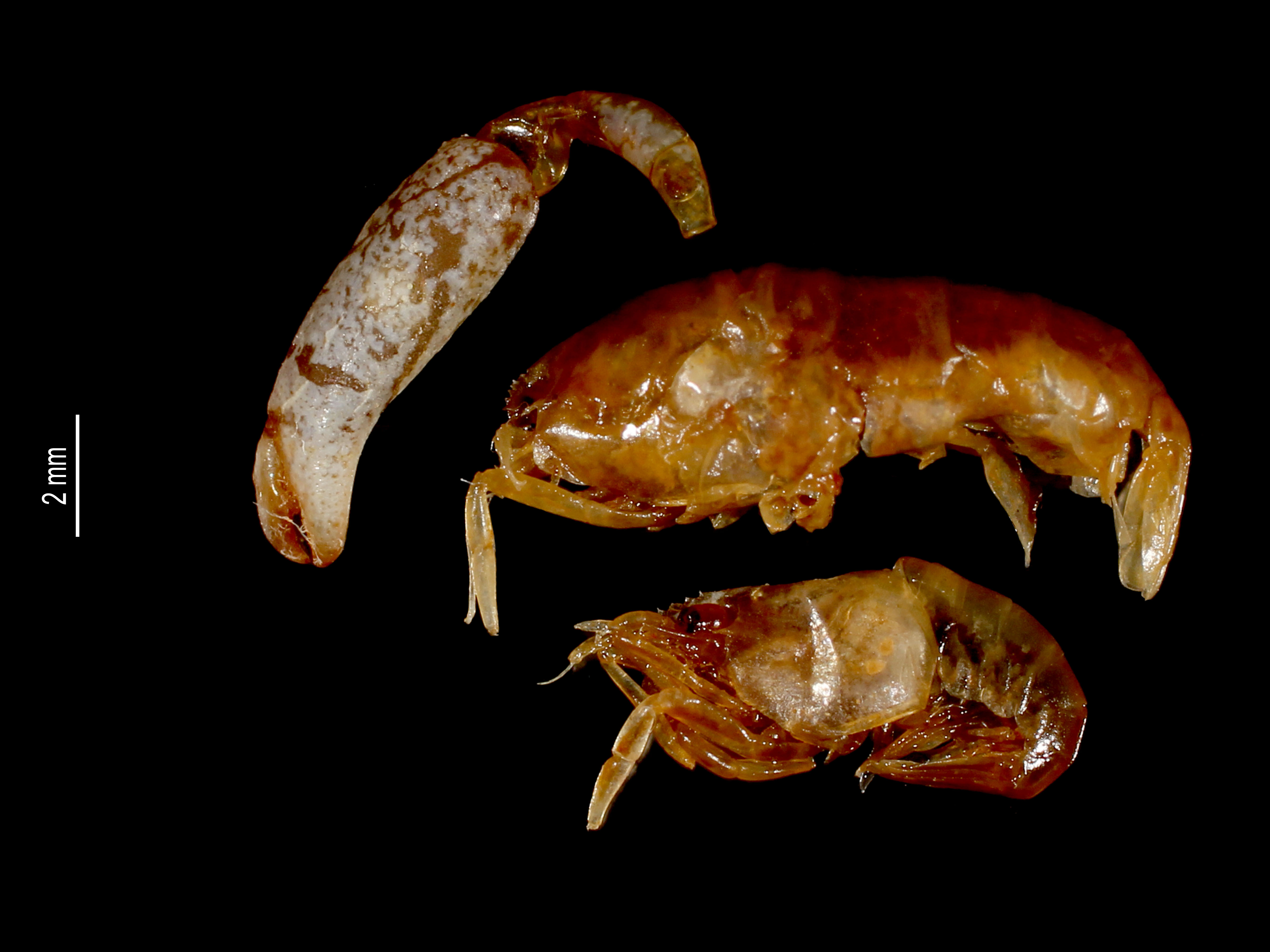
- Periclimenaeus hecate

Scientific classification
- Domain: Eukaryota
- Kingdom: Animalia
- Phylum: Arthropoda
- Class: Malacostraca
- Order: Decapoda
- Suborder: Pleocyemata
- Infraorder: Caridea
- Family: Palaemonidae
- Genus: Periclimenaeus; Borradaile, 1915

Type species
- Coralliocaris tridendatus Borradaile, 1915

= Periclimenaeus =

Genus of crustaceans

Periclimenaeus is a genus of decapod crustaceans of the family Palaemonidae which is part of the infraorder Caridea. The genus was named by the English carcinologist Lancelot Alexander Borradaile in 1915. He set out the distinguishing features of the genus as:

Body rather stout, cephalothorax deep, a good deal compressed, abdomen greatly curved Thorax without dorsal swelling. Rostrum rather short, compressed, toothed above only. Outer antennular flagellum not deeply cleft. Antennal scale of good breadth. Mandible without palp. Second maxilliped without podopalp. Third maxilliped narrow, with vestigial arthrobranch.

— L.A. Borradaile,

Pericimaenaeus robustus is known only from the type specimen which was collected off Amirante Islands by the Western Indian Ocean Expeditions of Prof. J. Stanley Gardiner and described in 1915 and again in 1917 by Borradaile, it was re-described by Dr A.J. "Sandy" Bruce of the Queensland Museum in 2005.

== Biological notes ==
Periclimenaeus consists of number of species of small shrimps classified in the subfamily Pontoniinae. They occur mainly in tropical seas, especially in and around coral reefs. Periclimanaeus shrimps live in association with a variety of hosts, mostly sponges and ascidian tunicates, where they normally live in the hosts' internal cavities as pairs formed of a male and a female. Characteristics of the genus include the presence of grossly unequal chelae on the second pair of walking legs, the larger of which has a conspicuous molar process on the seventh and terminal segment of the leg, which sits opposite a depression on the fixed finger, this is used to produce sound, a feature which is convergent with similar structures in the related genus Coralliocaris and in some unrelated genera of snapping shrimps from the family Alpheidae.

== Species ==
Periclimenaeus is the genus in the Palaemonidae with the second highest number of species with their distribution centred on the Indo-West Pacific region where there are 60 or so species with a further 14 identified so far in the Atlantic and eastern Pacific. The first species to be described was described from specimens caught in the Torres Strait by HMS Alert during 1881-82. These specimens were described by Edward J. Miers as Coralliocaris tridendatus, this was then assigned to Periclimenaeus as P. tridentatus after Borradaile named the genus.

The following species are currently recognised:

- Periclimenaeus ancylodactylus Bruce, 2014
- Periclimenaeus arabicus (Calman, 1939)
- Periclimenaeus ardeae Bruce, 1970
- Periclimenaeus arthrodactylus Holthuis, 1952
- Periclimenaeus ascidiarum Holthuis, 1951
- Periclimenaeus atlanticus (Rathbun, 1901)
- Periclimenaeus aurae dos Santos, Calado & Araújo, 2008
- Periclimenaeus aurantiacus Bruce, 2014
- Periclimenaeus bermudensis (Armstrong, 1940)
- Periclimenaeus bidentatus Bruce, 1970
- Periclimenaeus bouvieri (Nobili, 1904)
- Periclimenaeus bredini Chace, 1972
- Periclimenaeus brucei Cardoso & Young, 2007
- Periclimenaeus calmani Bruce, 2012
- Periclimenaeus caraibicus Holthuis, 1951
- Periclimenaeus chacei Abele, 1971
- Periclimenaeus colemani Bruce, 2014
- Periclimenaeus colodactylus Bruce, 1996
- Periclimenaeus crassipes (Calman, 1939)
- Periclimenaeus creefi Bruce, 2010
- Periclimenaeus crosnieri Cardoso & Young, 2007
- Periclimenaeus dactylodon Bruce, 2012
- Periclimenaeus denticulodigitus Bruce, 2014
- Periclimenaeus devaneyi Bruce, 2010
- Periclimenaeus diplosomatis Bruce, 1980
- Periclimenaeus djiboutensis Bruce, 1970
- Periclimenaeus echinimanus Ďuriš, Horka & Al-Horani, 2011
- Periclimenaeus edmondsoni Bruce, 2013
- Periclimenaeus fawatu Bruce, 2006
- Periclimenaeus forcipulatus Bruce, 2014
- Periclimenaeus garthi Bruce, 1976
- Periclimenaeus gorgonidarum (Balss, 1913)
- Periclimenaeus hancocki Holthuis, 1951
- Periclimenaeus hebedactylus Bruce, 1970
- Periclimenaeus hecate (Nobili, 1904)
- Periclimenaeus heronensis Bruce, 2010
- Periclimenaeus holthuisi Bruce, 1969
- Periclimenaeus jeancharcoti Bruce, 1991
- Periclimenaeus kottae Bruce, 2005
- Periclimenaeus leptodactylus Fujino & Miyake, 1968
- Periclimenaeus lobiferus Bruce, 1978
- Periclimenaeus manihinei Bruce, 1976
- Periclimenaeus marini Bruce, 2013
- Periclimenaeus matherae Bruce, 2005
- Periclimenaeus maxillulidens (Schmitt, 1936)
- Periclimenaeus minutus Holthuis, 1952
- Periclimenaeus mortenseni Bruce, 1993
- Periclimenaeus myora Bruce, 1998
- Periclimenaeus nielbrucei Bruce, 2006
- Periclimenaeus nobilii Bruce, 1975
- Periclimenaeus nufu Ďuriš, Horká & Hoc, 2009
- Periclimenaeus orbitocarinatus Fransen, 2006
- Periclimenaeus orontes Bruce, 1986
- Periclimenaeus pachydentatus Bruce, 1969
- Periclimenaeus pachyspinosus Marin, 2007
- Periclimenaeus pacificus Holthuis, 1951
- Periclimenaeus palauensis Miyake & Fujino, 1968
- Periclimenaeus parkeri Bruce, 2012
- Periclimenaeus pearsei (Schmitt, 1932)
- Periclimenaeus pectinidactylus Ďuriš, Horká & Sandford, 2009
- Periclimenaeus perlatus (Boone, 1930)
- Periclimenaeus pulitzerfinali ^{Bruce, 2011}
- Periclimenaeus quadridentatus (Rathbun, 1906)
- Periclimenaeus rastrifer Bruce, 1980
- Periclimenaeus rhodope (Nobili, 1904)
- Periclimenaeus robustus Borradaile, 1915
- Periclimenaeus schmitti ^{Holthuis, 1951}
- Periclimenaeus serenei Bruce, 2012
- Periclimenaeus serrula Bruce & Coombes, 1995
- Periclimenaeus solitus Bruce & Coombes, 1995
- Periclimenaeus spinosus Holthuis, 1951
- Periclimenaeus spongicola Holthuis, 1952
- Periclimenaeus storchi Bruce, 1989
- Periclimenaeus stylirostris Bruce, 1969
- Periclimenaeus tchesunovi Ďuriš, 1990
- Periclimenaeus tridentatus (Miers, 1884)
- Periclimenaeus trispinosus Bruce, 1969
- Periclimenaeus tuamotae Bruce, 1969
- Periclimenaeus uropodialis Barnard, 1958
- Periclimenaeus usitatus Bruce, 1969
- Periclimenaeus wilsoni (Hay, 1917)
- Periclimenaeus wolffi Bruce, 1993
- Periclimenaeus zanzibaricus Bruce, 1969
- Periclimenaeus zarenkovi Ďuriš, 1990
