= Phyllotymolinidae =

Scientific classification
- Kingdom: Animalia
- Phylum: Arthropoda
- Class: Malacostraca
- Order: Decapoda
- Suborder: Pleocyemata
- Infraorder: Brachyura
- Section: Cyclodorippoida
- Superfamily: Cyclodorippoidea
- Family: Phyllotymolinidae

Family of crustaceans

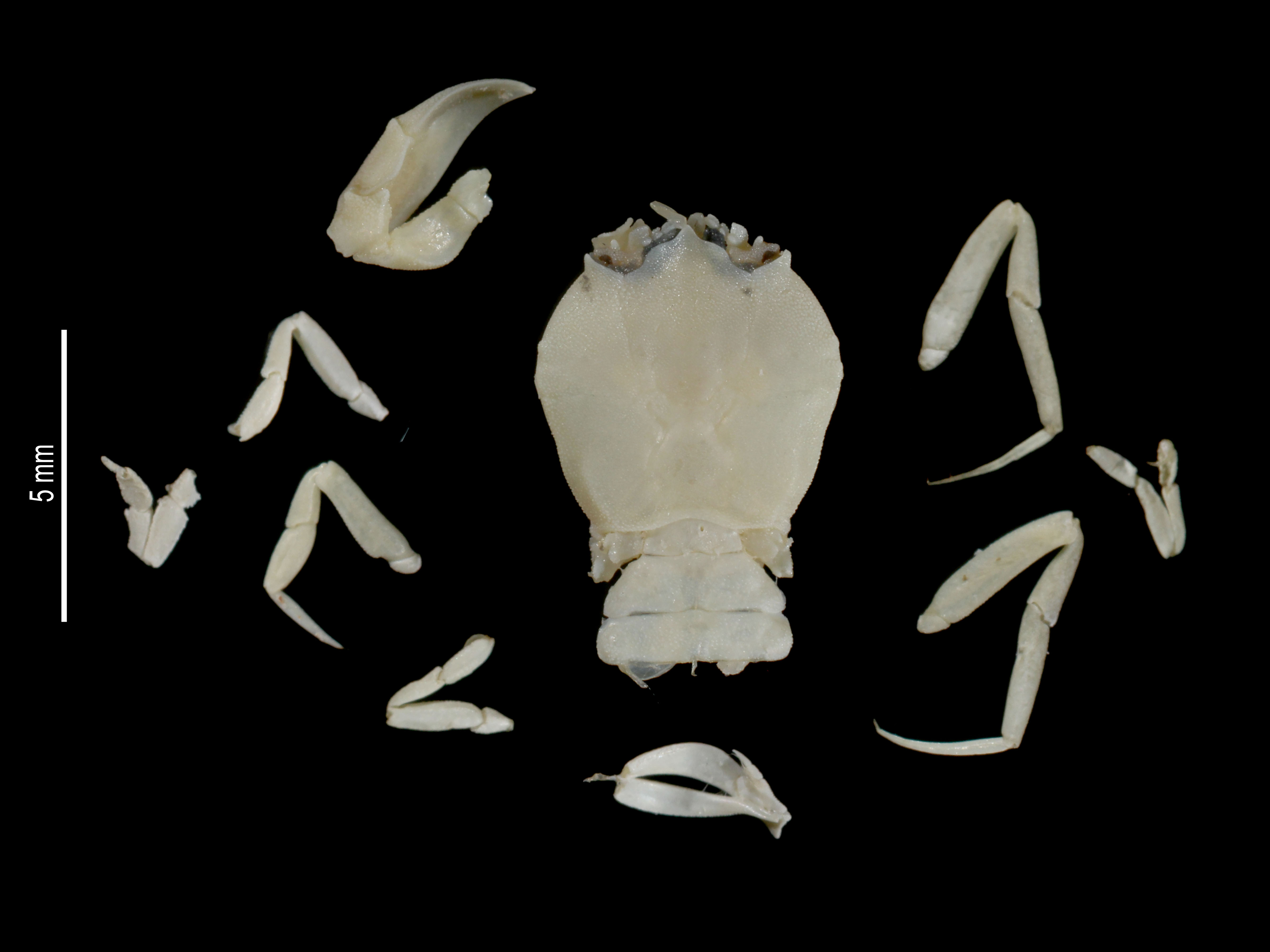

Phyllotymolinidae is a family of crustaceans belonging to the order Decapoda.

Genera:

- Genkaia Miyake & Takeda, 1970
- Lonchodactylus Tavares & Lemaitre, 1996
- Phyllotymolinum Tavares, 1993
