= Red lobster =

Red lobster may refer to:

- California spiny lobster (Palinurus interruptus), a crustacean from the eastern Pacific Ocean
- Eunephrops bairdii, a crustacean from the Caribbean Sea
- Palinurus elephas, a crustacean from the eastern Atlantic Ocean and Mediterranean Sea
- Red Lobster, an American restaurant chain
