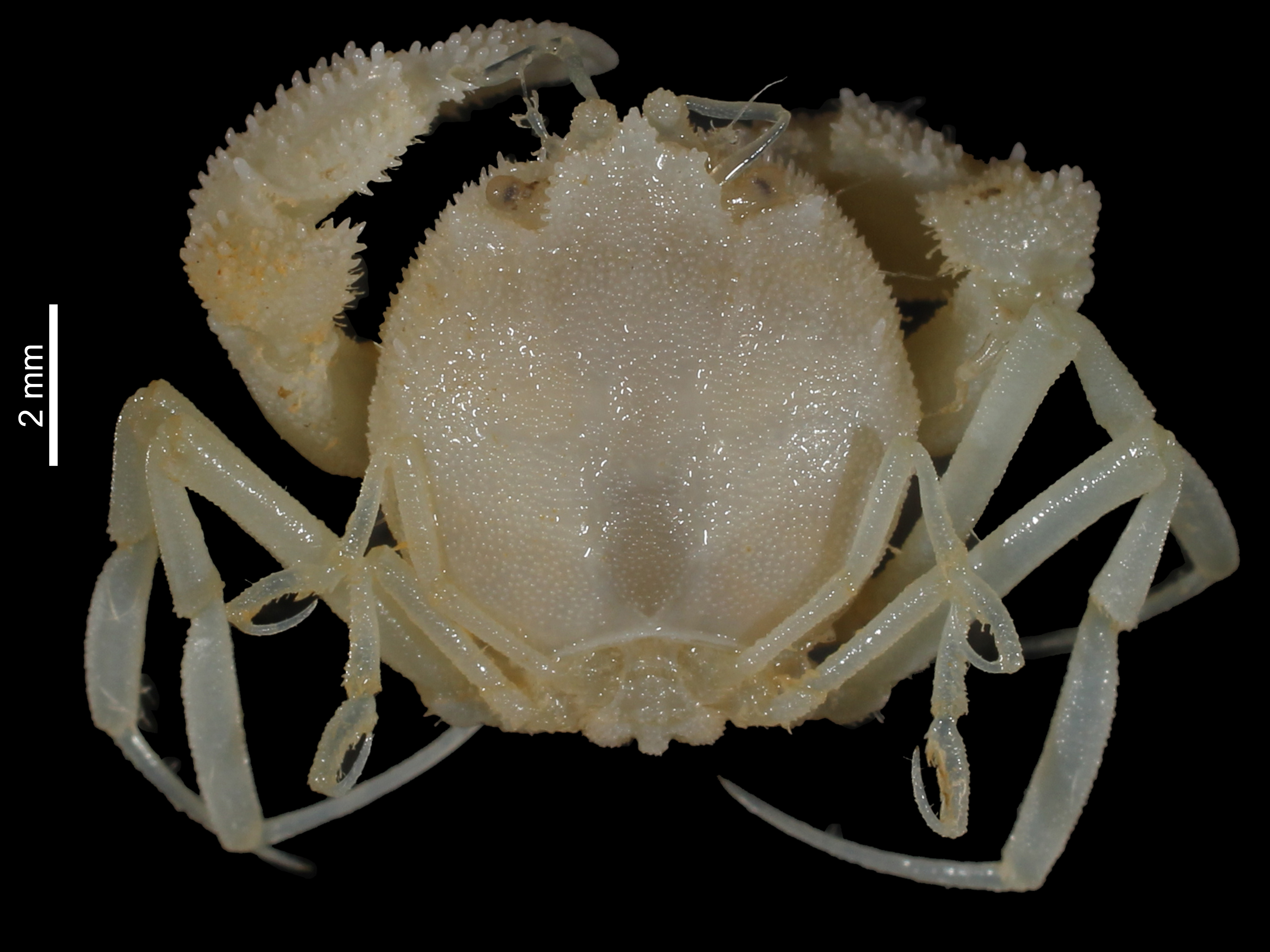
- Krangalangia orstom

Scientific classification
- Domain: Eukaryota
- Kingdom: Animalia
- Phylum: Arthropoda
- Class: Malacostraca
- Order: Decapoda
- Suborder: Pleocyemata
- Infraorder: Brachyura
- Section: Cyclodorippoida
- Superfamily: Cyclodorippoidea
- Family: Cyclodorippidae; Ortmann, 1892

= Cyclodorippidae =

Family of crustaceans

Cyclodorippidae is a family of crustaceans belonging to the order Decapoda.

Genera:

- Clythrocerus Milne-Edwards & Bouvier, 1899
- Corycodus Milne-Edwards, 1880
- Cyclodorippe Milne-Edwards, 1880
- Deilocerus Tavares, 1993
- Ketamia Tavares, 1992
- Krangalangia Tavares, 1992
- Miotymolus Feldmann, Schweitzer, Casadio & Griffin, 2011
- Neocorycodus Tavares, 1993
- Simodorippe Chace, 1940
- Tymolus Stimpson, 1858
- Xeinostoma Stebbing, 1920
