= Vulcanocalliax =

Vulcanocalliax arutyunovi

Scientific classification
- Kingdom: Animalia
- Phylum: Arthropoda
- Subphylum: Crustacea
- Class: Malacostraca
- Order: Decapoda
- Family: Callianassidae
- Subfamily: Vulcanocalliacinae Dworschak & Cunha, 2007
- Genus: Vulcanocalliax Dworschak & Cunha, 2007
- Species: V. arutyunovi

Binomial name
- Vulcanocalliax arutyunovi Dworschak & Cunha, 2007

Genus of crustaceans

Vulcanocalliax arutyunovi is a species of crustacean found on a mud volcano in the Gulf of Cádiz between Spain and Morocco. It was discovered during the Census of Marine Life, and is so distinct from its closest relatives that it has been placed in a new subfamily, the Vulcanocalliacinae. The species is unusually large for a ghost shrimp, but despite that appears to brood only a single embryo. The species is named after the volcano on which it was discovered, Captain Arutyunov.
