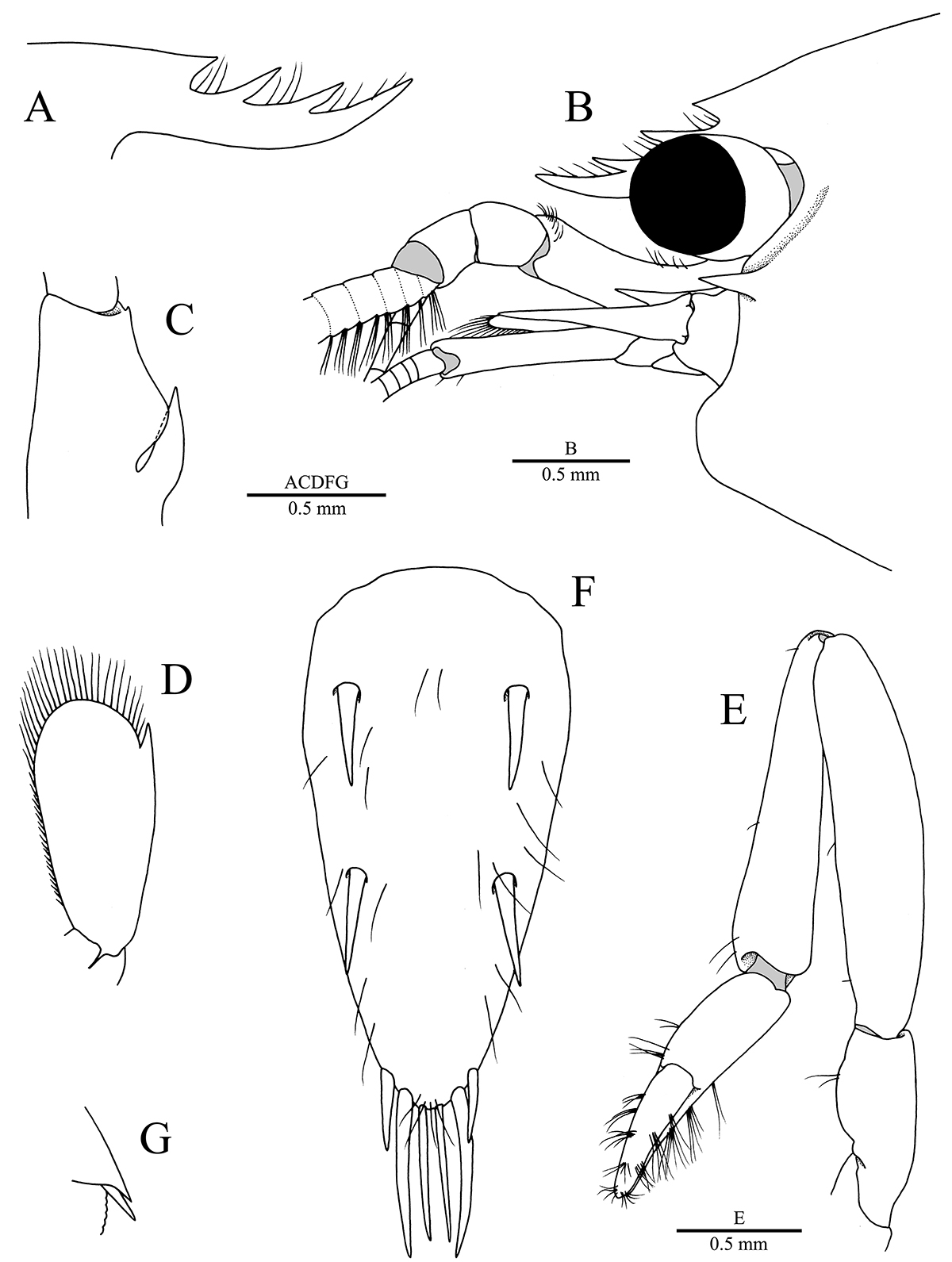
- Periclimenaeus ascidiarum Holthuis

Scientific classification
- Kingdom: Animalia
- Phylum: Arthropoda
- Clade: Pancrustacea
- Class: Malacostraca
- Order: Decapoda
- Suborder: Pleocyemata
- Infraorder: Caridea
- Family: Palaemonidae
- Genus: Periclimenaeus
- Species: P. ascidiarum

Binomial name
- Periclimenaeus ascidiarum Holthuis, 1951

= Periclimenaeus ascidiarum =

Species of shrimp

Periclimenaeus ascidiarum is a species of shrimp of the family Palaemonidae. Periclimenaeus ascidiarum is found off the coasts of Florida, Colombia, Mexico, and elsewhere.
