= Eunephrops manningi =

Conservation status
- Data Deficient (IUCN 3.1)

Scientific classification
- Kingdom: Animalia
- Phylum: Arthropoda
- Class: Malacostraca
- Order: Decapoda
- Suborder: Pleocyemata
- Family: Nephropidae
- Genus: Eunephrops
- Species: E. manningi

Binomial name
- Eunephrops manningi Holthuis, 1974

Species of lobster

Eunephrops manningi, the banded lobster, is a species of lobster found in the West Indies. It was named in 1974 by carcinologist Lipke Holthuis after his friend and fellow carcinologist Raymond B. Manning.

== Description ==
It grows to a length of 15 centimetres (6 in) (carapace length 4–7 cm or 1.6–2.8 in) and lives at depths of 450–550 metres (1,480–1,800 ft). While it is large enough to be a target for commercial lobster fishing, this is precluded by its rarity, only three specimens having ever been collected. It can be distinguished from other species in the genus by the lack of post-cervical spines on the carapace, and by the presence of only transverse grooves on the body segments of the abdomen.
