= Melybia =

Scientific classification
- Kingdom: Animalia
- Phylum: Arthropoda
- Class: Malacostraca
- Order: Decapoda
- Suborder: Pleocyemata
- Infraorder: Brachyura
- Family: Xanthidae
- Genus: Melybia; Stimpson, 1871
- Species: M. thalamita

Binomial name
- Melybia thalamita Stimpson, 1871

Synonyms
- Melybia forceps A. Milne-Edwards, 1880

Genus of crabs

Melybia thalamita is a species of crab in the family Xanthidae, the only species in the genus Melybia. It is found in the western Atlantic Ocean, from Florida and the Gulf of Mexico south to São Paulo, Brazil, at depths of 10–200 metres (33–656 ft).
