= Carpoporus =

Scientific classification
- Domain: Eukaryota
- Kingdom: Animalia
- Phylum: Arthropoda
- Class: Malacostraca
- Order: Decapoda
- Suborder: Pleocyemata
- Infraorder: Brachyura
- Family: Xanthidae
- Genus: Carpoporus; Stimpson, 1871
- Species: C. papulosus

Binomial name
- Carpoporus papulosus Stimpson, 1871

Genus of crabs

Carpoporus papulosus is a species of crabs in the family Xanthidae, the only species in the genus Carpoporus.
