= Eunephrops bairdii =

Conservation status
- Data Deficient (IUCN 3.1)

Scientific classification
- Kingdom: Animalia
- Phylum: Arthropoda
- Class: Malacostraca
- Order: Decapoda
- Suborder: Pleocyemata
- Family: Nephropidae
- Genus: Eunephrops
- Species: E. bairdii

Binomial name
- Eunephrops bairdii S. I. Smith, 1885

Species of lobster

Eunephrops bairdii is a species of marine lobster, commonly called the "red lobster", endemic to the Caribbean Sea. It is found off the coasts of Colombia and Panama at depths of 230–360 metres (750–1,180 ft). It reaches a length of up to 20 centimetres (7.9 in), which is equivalent to a carapace length of 4–9 centimetres (1.6–3.5 in), but is apparently too scarce for commercial exploitation.
