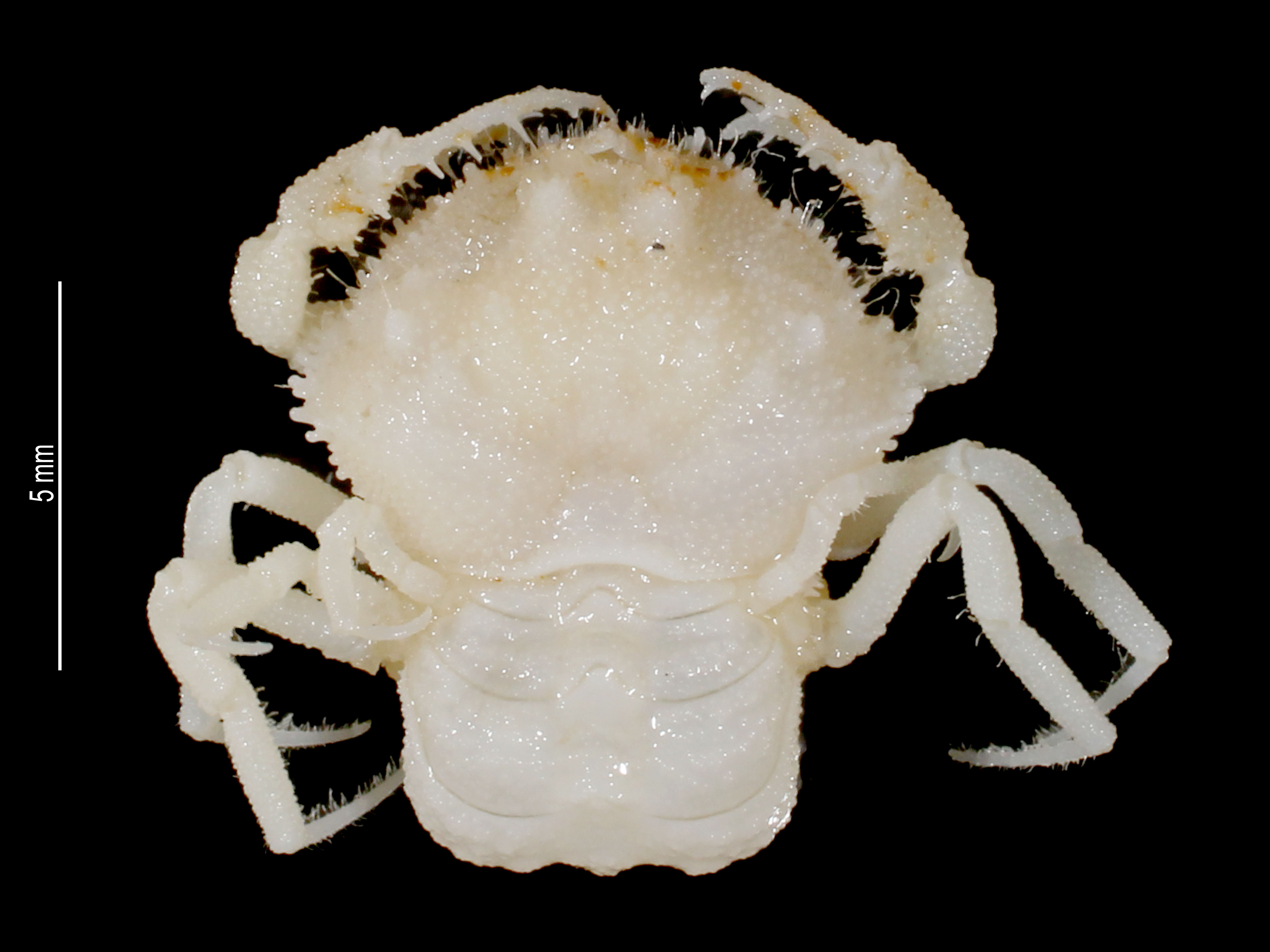
- Corycodus disjunctipes

Scientific classification
- Kingdom: Animalia
- Phylum: Arthropoda
- Class: Malacostraca
- Order: Decapoda
- Suborder: Pleocyemata
- Infraorder: Brachyura
- Section: Cyclodorippoida; Ortmann, 1892
- Superfamily: Cyclodorippoidea; Ortmann, 1892

Families
- Cyclodorippidae; Cymonomidae; Phyllotymolinidae

= Cyclodorippoida =

Group of crabs

Cyclodorippoida is a group of crabs, ranked as a section. It contains the single superfamily Cyclodorippoidea, which holds three families, Cyclodorippidae, Cymonomidae and Phyllotymolinidae.

Below is a cladogram showing Cyclodorippoida's placement within Brachyura:

- Brachyura
  - Dromiacea
  - - - Raninoida
      - Cyclodorippoida
    - Eubrachyura
      - Heterotremata
      - Thoracotremata
