= Xantho pilipes =

Scientific classification
- Domain: Eukaryota
- Kingdom: Animalia
- Phylum: Arthropoda
- Class: Malacostraca
- Order: Decapoda
- Suborder: Pleocyemata
- Infraorder: Brachyura
- Family: Xanthidae
- Genus: Xantho
- Species: X. pilipes

Binomial name
- Xantho pilipes (A. Milne-Edwards, 1867)

Species of crab

Xantho pilipes, or Risso's crab, is a species of crab from the family Xanthidae, named for the naturalist Antoine Risso.

== Description ==
Risso's crab is small, adults measuring 15–30 mm (0.59–1.18 in) in length. It is marbly and varied in colour from red to yellow to brown. It has dense hairs on the back of its legs, hence the specific name pilipes, 'hairy legs'.

== Ecology ==
Xantho pilipes lives in seawater up to depths of 100 m (330 ft). It hides under rocks and in coarse gravel.

== Distribution ==
Xantho pilipes is found in the Mediterranean and eastern Atlantic. It is common off the coasts of Great Britain and Ireland.
