= Eunephrops cadenasi =

Conservation status
- Least Concern (IUCN 3.1)

Scientific classification
- Kingdom: Animalia
- Phylum: Arthropoda
- Class: Malacostraca
- Order: Decapoda
- Suborder: Pleocyemata
- Family: Nephropidae
- Genus: Eunephrops
- Species: E. cadenasi

Binomial name
- Eunephrops cadenasi Chace, 1939

Species of lobster

Eunephrops cadenasi, sometimes called the sculptured lobster, is a species of lobster found in the Caribbean.

== Description ==
Eunephrops cadenasi is a medium-sized lobster with a cylindrical body. Adult male individuals of Eunephrops cadenasi reach a total length of 30 centimetres (12 in), and a carapace length of 5–14 cm (2.0–5.5 in), while females only reach a carapace length of 4–5 cm (1.6–2.0 in). The first three pairs of legs bear claws, of which the first pair are enlarged.

== Distribution ==
The natural range of Eunephrops cadenasi extends from the seas off the Bahamas and Dominica southwards to Jamaica and Colombia. They have been collected from depths of 434–591 metres (1,424–1,939 ft).

== Taxonomic history ==
Eunephrops cadenasi was named by Fenner A. Chace Jr. in 1939; the type locality was at a depth of 300–315 fathoms (1,800–1,890 ft; 549–576 m) at "Nicholas Channel south of Cay Sal Bank" (23°21′N 79°58′W), north of the island of Cuba. The specific epithet cadenasi commemorates José Manuel Cadenas y Aguilera, Rector of the University of Havana.
