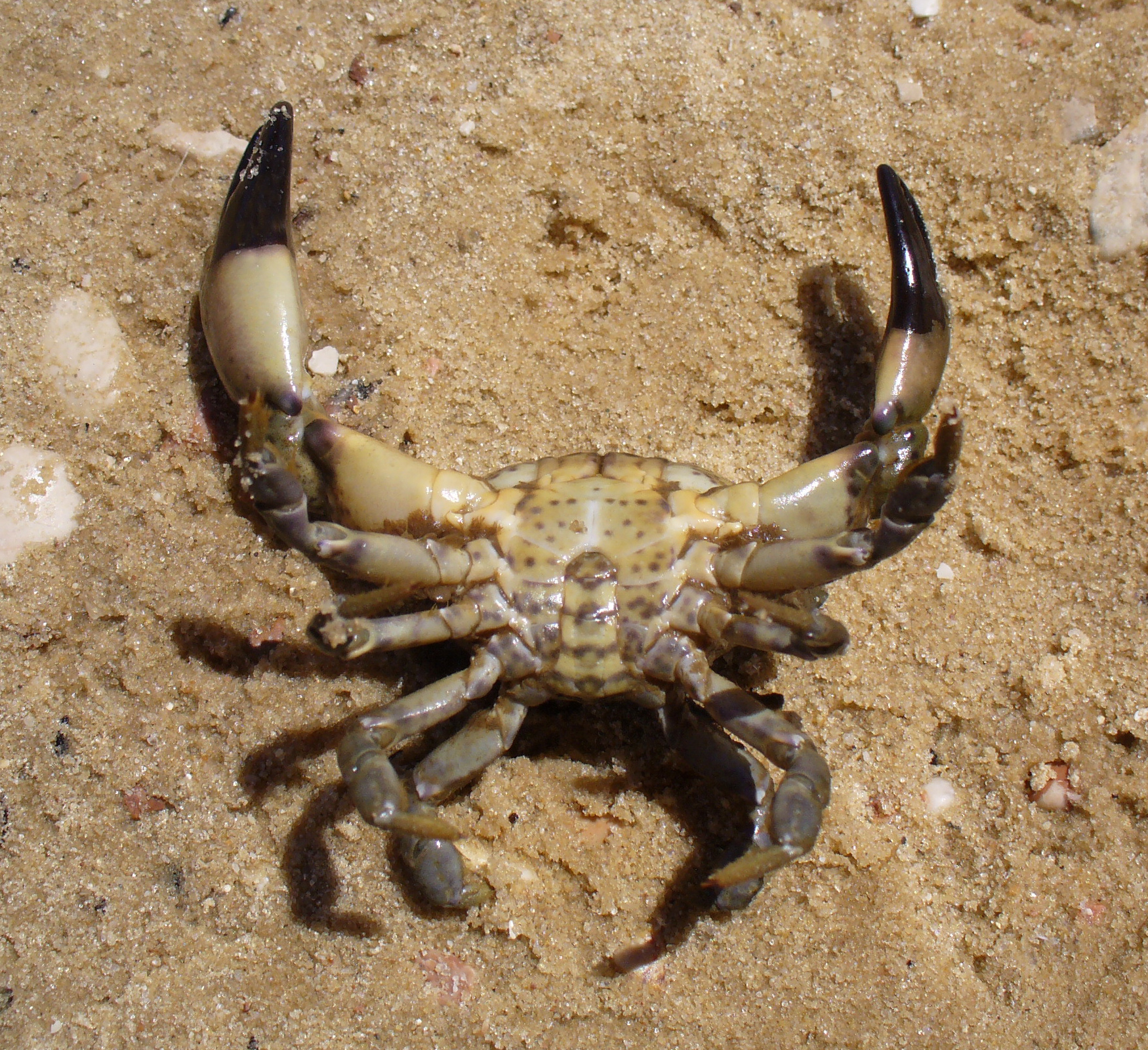

Scientific classification
- Kingdom: Animalia
- Phylum: Arthropoda
- Class: Malacostraca
- Order: Decapoda
- Suborder: Pleocyemata
- Infraorder: Brachyura
- Family: Xanthidae
- Genus: Xantho
- Species: X. poressa

Binomial name
- Xantho poressa (Olivi, 1792)

Synonyms
- Alpheus tinctor Weber, 1795 (nomen nudum); Cancer poressa Olivi, 1792; Cancer tinctor Fabricius, 1798; Xantho rivulosa Risso, 1827

= Xantho poressa =

Species of crab

Xantho poressa, the jaguar round crab, is a species of crab from the eastern Atlantic Ocean. It is one of four species in the genus Xantho.

== Description ==
The juveniles of X. poressa are cryptically coloured as camouflage among the epibionts on the leaves of Posidonia with a variable carapace colour, which can be yellowish, reddish, brown, or dark grey with patches of another colour, usually white. The pereiopods are usually banded with dark brown or black bands alternating with white or translucent stripes or spots, although the fifth pereiopod is brighter and often unmarked. The adults are uniformly dark grey in colour and they leave the seagrass beds for more open, rocky substrates.

== Distribution ==
X. poressa is distributed throughout the Black Sea and the Mediterranean Sea and into the warmer parts of the north eastern Atlantic to the Canary Islands.

== Biology ==
The larvae of X. poressa go through four zoeal and one megalopal stages, which are typical of most of the related species of crabs in the subfamily Xanthinae. The duration of each zoeal stage is 2–4 days and the megalopa stage lasts an average of 10 days, with the first juvenile crab stage being reached after 23 days. Juveniles live in Posidonia meadows until their last moult, when they migrate to the nearest rocky substrate. In the Black Sea, X. poressa is common near the shoreline at depths less than 1 m; it is mainly found stones on substrates of pebble and crushed rock; it is rare on the other substrates and may occur down to 15 m in depth.

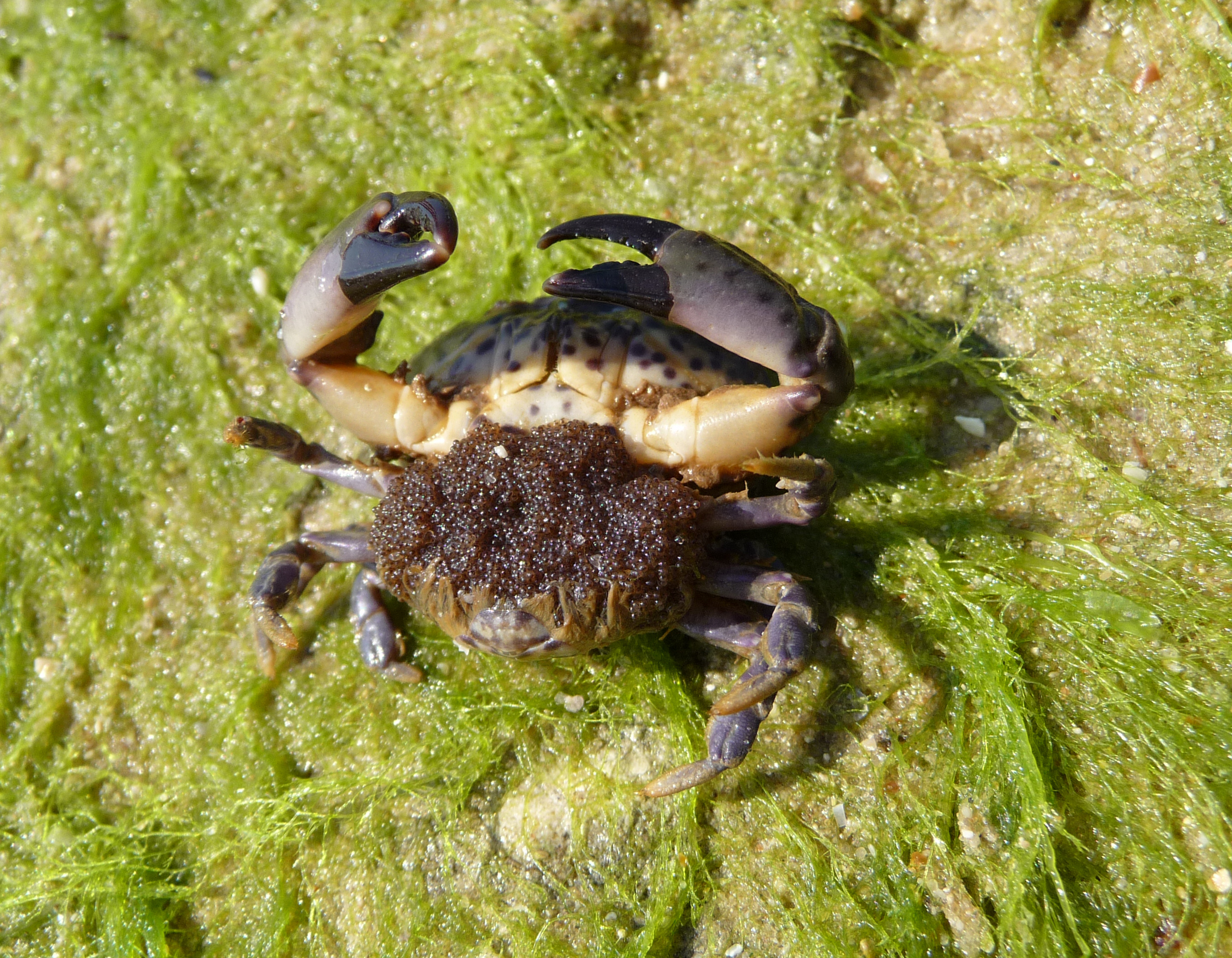
Underside of a "berried" female, carrying eggs under her abdomen
