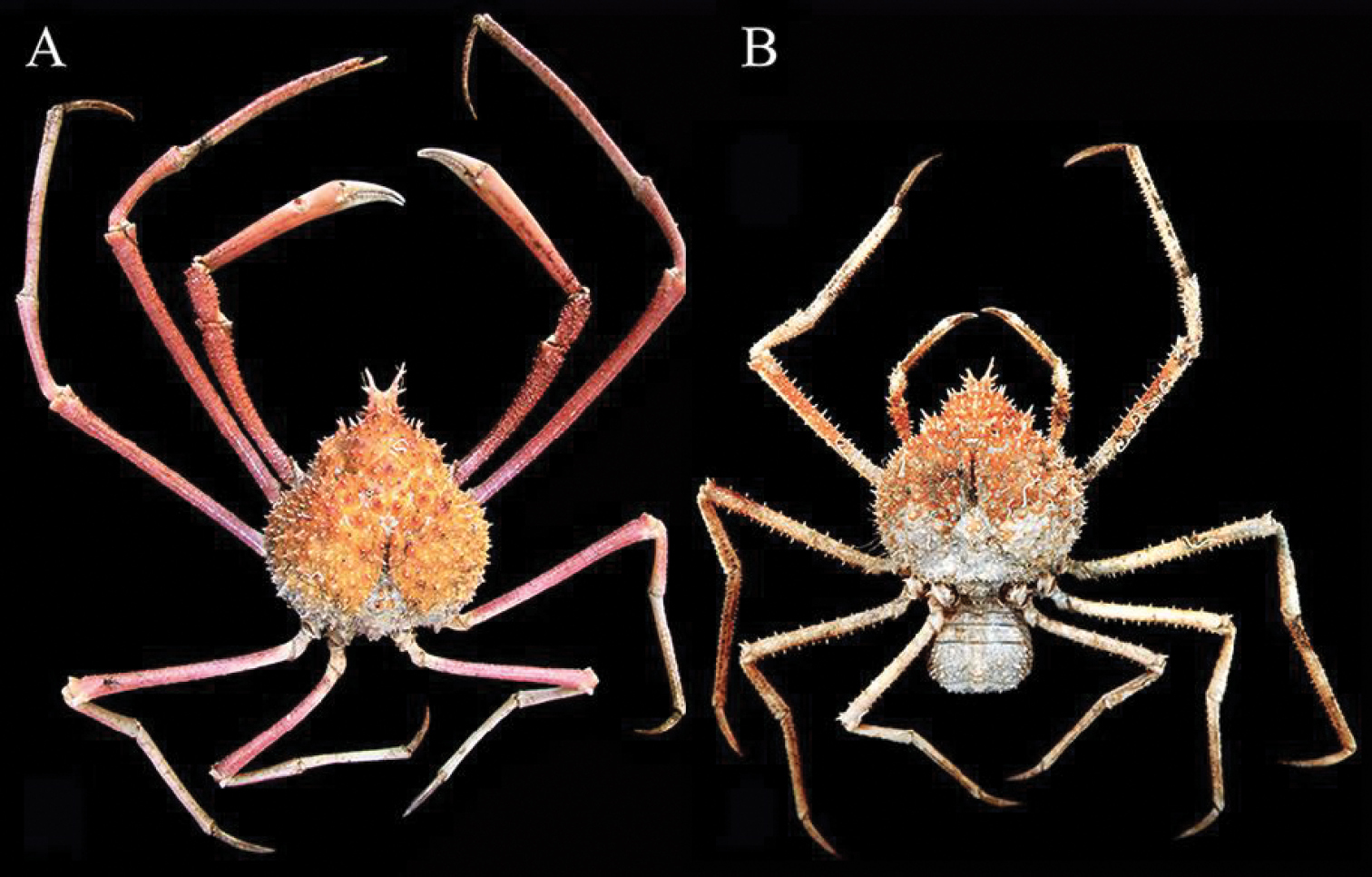
- A. large male specimen, B. female specimen, both collected from the Bay of Bengal

Scientific classification
- Domain: Eukaryota
- Kingdom: Animalia
- Phylum: Arthropoda
- Class: Malacostraca
- Order: Decapoda
- Suborder: Pleocyemata
- Infraorder: Brachyura
- Family: Oregoniidae
- Genus: Pleistacantha
- Species: P. kannu

Binomial name
- Pleistacantha kannu Ng, Ravinesh & Ravichandran, 2017

= Pleistacantha kannu =

Species of crab

Pleistacantha kannu is a species of spider crab in the family Oregoniidae. It is found on the coast of Southern India from the Bay of Bengal at depths of 129–530 m (423–1,739 ft).

== Description ==
Pleistacantha kannu has a pyriform carapace whose dorsal surface is covered with short, conical, broad-based spines and sharp tubercles. Its carapace is about as long postrostrally (Note: Excluding the rostrum) as it is wide, measuring up to 150 mm (5.9 in) long and up to 138 mm (5.4 in) wide. Its branchial region is strongly inflated, distinguishing it from similar Pleistacantha species such as P. moseleyi, P. pungens, and P. ori. It is the largest spider crab known to inhabit the Indian Ocean.

Its carapace ranges from orange to orange-red on the dorsal surface, its chelipeds and walking legs are reddish-brown with white fingers in males and orange and white in females, and its ventral surfaces are dirty white. Its walking legs end in a horn-like tip covered in setae, and they are covered in short tubercles and granules. Its abdomen lacks spines but is covered in numerous blunt and sharp tubercles.

== Taxonomy ==
Pleistacantha kannu was described in 2017 by carcinologists Peter Kee Lin Ng, Raveendhiran Ravinesh, and S. Ravichandran. It is named after T. Kannupandi, an Indian carcinologist at the Annamalai University. It is considered likely conspecific with a crab collected in 1997 from the Gulf of Aden.
