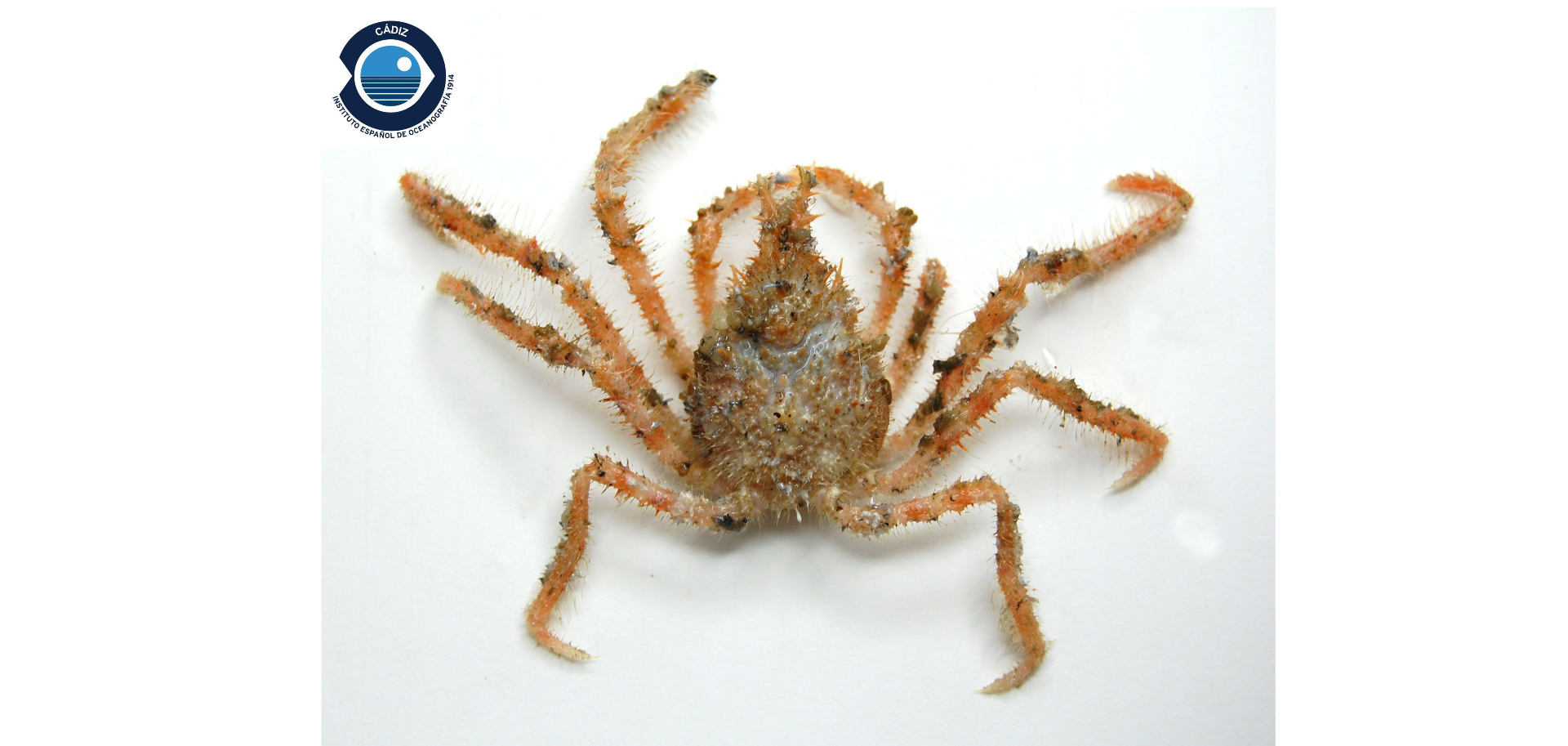

Scientific classification
- Domain: Eukaryota
- Kingdom: Animalia
- Phylum: Arthropoda
- Class: Malacostraca
- Order: Decapoda
- Suborder: Pleocyemata
- Infraorder: Brachyura
- Family: Oregoniidae
- Genus: Pleistacantha
- Species: P. ori

Binomial name
- Pleistacantha ori Ahyong & Ng, 2007

= Pleistacantha ori =

Species of crab

Pleistacantha ori is a species of spider crab found in Madagascar and the east coast of South Africa at depths of 238–480 m (781–1,575 ft). It resembles Pleistacantha moseleyi and Pleistacantha pungens.

== Description ==
Pleistacantha ori has a pyriform carapace which is longer than it is wide when excluding the rostrum. It is the largest species of Pleistacantha, and the male holotype's carapace measures 129.1 mm (5.08 in) long excluding the rostrum (Note: 146.0 mm (5.75 in) when including the rostrum) and 106.3 mm (4.19 in) wide.

== Taxonomy ==
Pleistacantha ori was named in honour of the Oceanographic Research Institute (ORI) in Durban, South Africa.
