= Paulita =

Paulita may refer to:

- Paulita (crustacean), a genus of crustaceans in the family Inachoididae
- Paulita (plant), a genus of plants in the family Apiaceae
- Paulita, feminine forename
  - Paulita Sedgwick (1943–2009), artist, actress
