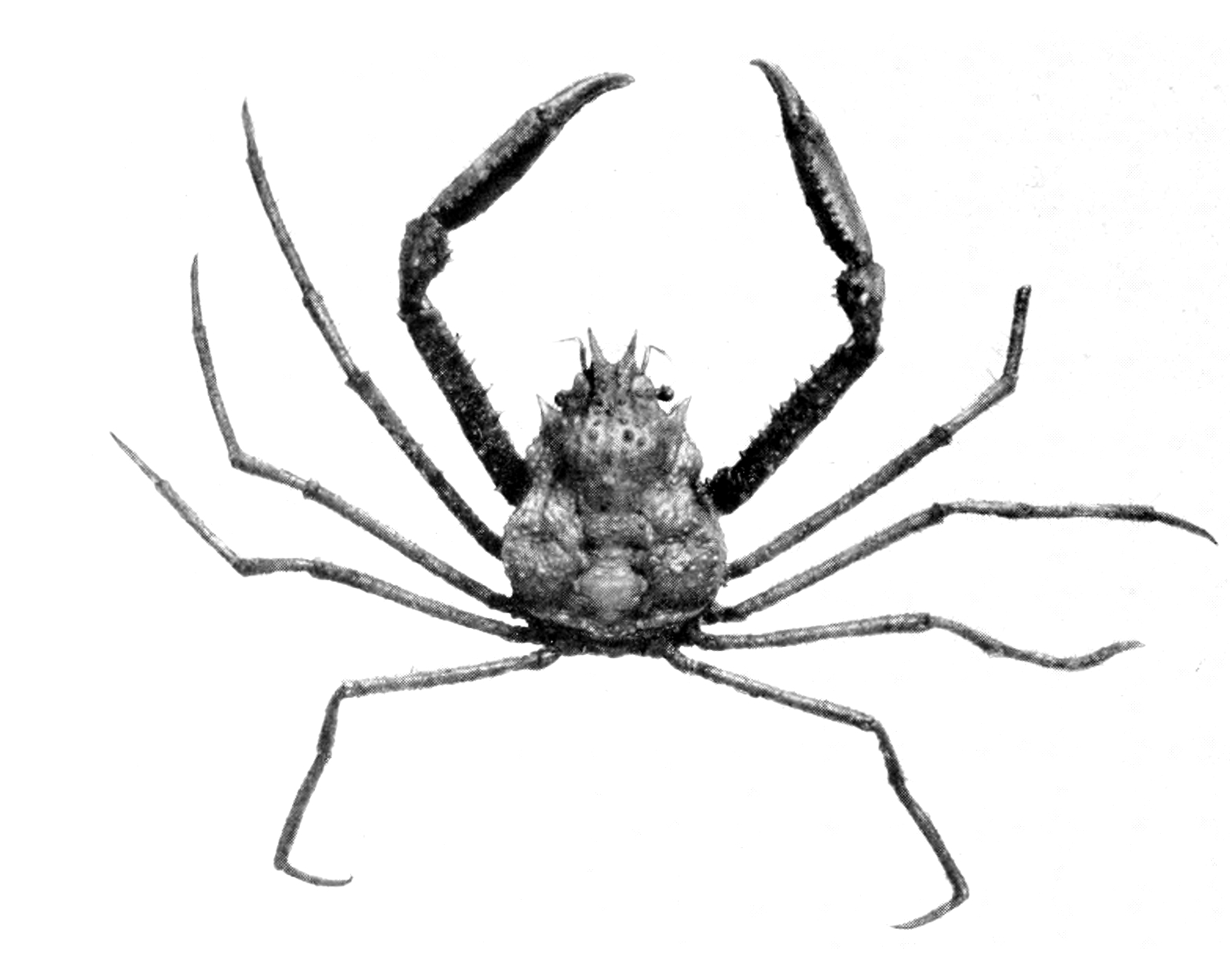
- Male
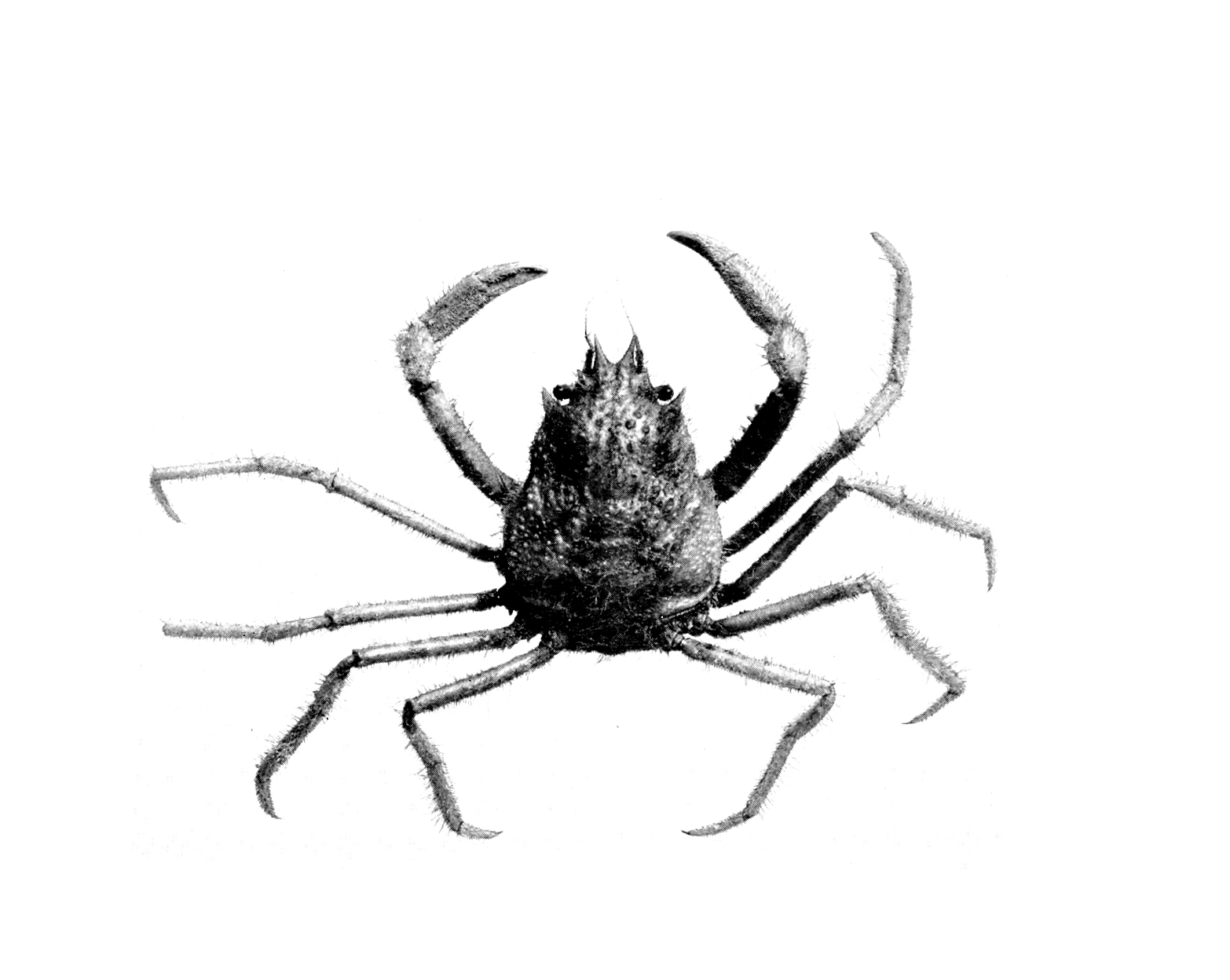
- Female

Scientific classification
- Kingdom: Animalia
- Phylum: Arthropoda
- Clade: Pancrustacea
- Class: Malacostraca
- Order: Decapoda
- Suborder: Pleocyemata
- Infraorder: Brachyura
- Family: Oregoniidae
- Genus: Oregonia
- Species: O. bifurca

Binomial name
- Oregonia bifurca Rathbun, 1902

= Oregonia bifurca =

Species of crab

Oregonia bifurca, commonly known as the split-nose crab or the split-nose decorator crab, is a species of crabs belonging to the family Oregoniidae. It is a rare deep-water species that inhabits the tops of seamounts and guyots in the northeastern Pacific Ocean; from the Aleutian Islands, the Bering Sea, the Hawaiian–Emperor seamount chain, to the waters off British Columbia. It is closely related to the more common shallow-water species Oregonia gracilis, the graceful decorator crab.

Like other majoid crabs, Oregonia bifurca are sexually dimorphic, with males larger than the females. The carapace length is about 33.7 millimetres (1.33 in) in males and 29 mm (1.1 in) in females. The entire body and the long and slender legs are covered densely with curving yellow hair.

== Taxonomy ==
Oregonia bifurca is one of the two extant species classified under the genus Oregonia, the other being the graceful decorator crab (Oregonia gracilis). It belongs to the family Oregoniidae under the superfamily Majoidea ("spider crabs"). It was first described by the American carcinologist Mary J. Rathbun in 1902. The single type specimen (a female) was collected from a depth of about 500 metres (1,600 ft) in the waters north of the Rat Islands of the Aleutian island chain (USS Albatross station 3785).

== Description ==
Oregonia bifurca are relatively small crabs. Like other members of Majoidea, they are sexually dimorphic. Adult males grow to an approximate carapace length of 33.7 millimetres (1.33 in) with a carapace width of about 25 mm (0.98 in). Adult females grow to an approximate carapace length of 29 mm (1.1 in) with a carapace width of about 20 mm (0.79 in).

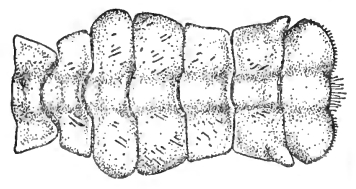
Abdomen of male

The carapace is somewhat oblong in shape, about three-fourths as wide as it is long. It is slightly narrower at the anterior end. Two small spines are present at the posterior margin of eye orbit (the postorbital spines). The basal segments of the antennae are narrow and have small and stout forward-pointing spines, with smaller spines on the outer and inner margins. The rostrum is divided into two short, flat, and gradually tapering horns, hence the common name "split-nose". They measure about 5 mm (0.20 in) long in males and 3.4 mm (0.13 in) long in females, and are similar in shape to the postorbital spines. The upper and lower surfaces of the body covered densely with small protuberances (tubercles) with soft and long yellow hairs that curve at the tip. The abdomen (pleon) is composed of seven distinct segments.

The appendages of males are slender and covered with dense long yellow curving hairs interspersed with shorter and finer hairs. The claw-bearing legs (chelipeds, the first pereiopod pair) are much longer and somewhat elongated in males than they are in females. Male chelipeds grow to a length of about 62 mm (2.4 in) with the claws (chelae) making up 25.6 mm (1.01 in). The arm (merus) of the chelipeds has two rows of spines on the inner margins, longer on the lower margin than on the upper margin. On the inner edge of the palm (manus) are four lengthwise rows of small spinules. The fixed finger (pollex) of the claw possesses a large tooth that fits into a groove in the movable finger (dactylus). They have a slight gape when closed fully, about two-fifths of the length from the base. They are about the same length as the palm. The walking legs (the rest of the pereiopods) gradually become shorter relative to each other from front-to-back, with lengths of approximately 59 mm (2.3 in), 56 mm (2.2 in), 51 mm (2.0 in), and 46 mm (1.8 in) respectively. The chelipeds in males are usually slightly longer than the first pair of walking legs. The first pair of pleopods of the males are also enlarged at the tips and possess rows of long filaments.

The appendages of females are also covered in dense long yellow curving hairs interspersed with shorter and finer hairs. Female chelipeds are much shorter than in males, only growing to about 37 mm (1.5 in). They are about one and a half times as long as the carapace. The arm of the chelipeds has a row of short blunt spines on the inner edge. The palm of the claws are about the same length as the fingers, and is slightly longer than the arm. The fixed finger and the moveable finger fit closely together and possess small teeth. Unlike in males, the cheliped is shorter than the first walking leg which is about 50 mm (2.0 in) in length. The rest of the walking legs also decrease in length front-to-back, as in males.

Oregonia bifurca can be readily distinguished from O. gracilis in having shorter rostral horns that curve away from each other, triangular postorbital spines closer to the eyes and pointing more forward, a wider front end of the carapace, and long and slender dactyli on their walking legs. The tuberculation in O. bifurca is finer than in O. gracilis.

== Distribution and habitat ==
Oregonia bifurca is a deep-water species usually found at depths of 500 to 1,400 m (1,600 to 4,600 ft). They live at the surface of seamounts and guyots, in habitats of sand, broken shell, and foraminiferous mud. Their habitat is mutually exclusive with that of O. gracilis, which is found in shallow water to only about 400 m (1,300 ft).

O. bifurca is a rare species. Aside from the waters around the Aleutian Islands, it has also been documented in the Bowers Bank of the western Bering Sea, the Nintoku Seamount of the central Pacific Hawaiian–Emperor seamount chain, and off the coast of British Columbia in North America.
