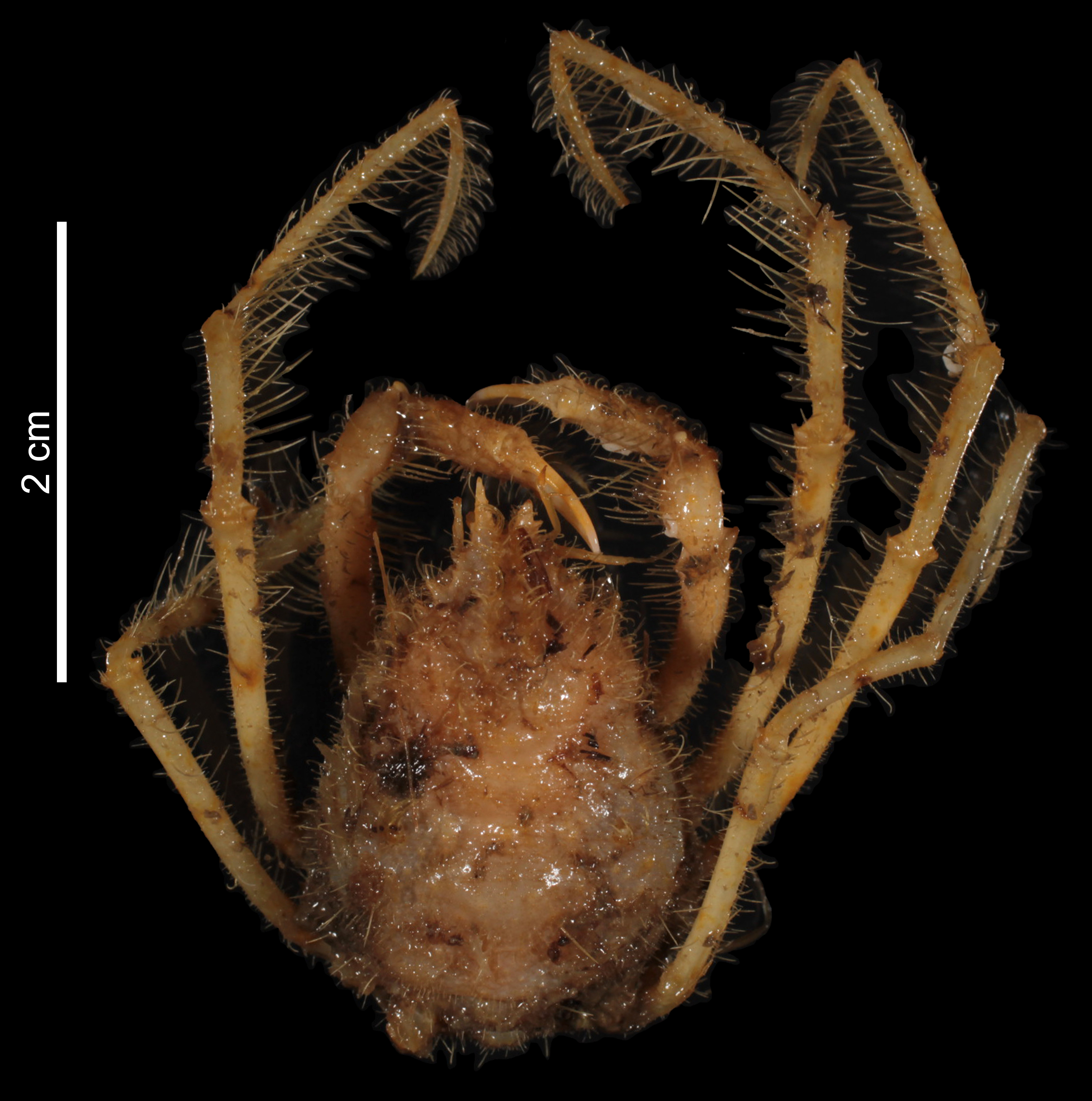
- A preserved specimen

Scientific classification
- Domain: Eukaryota
- Kingdom: Animalia
- Phylum: Arthropoda
- Class: Malacostraca
- Order: Decapoda
- Suborder: Pleocyemata
- Infraorder: Brachyura
- Family: Oregoniidae
- Genus: Pleisticanthoides; Yokoya, 1933

Type species
- Pleisticanthoides nipponensis Yokoya, 1933

= Pleisticanthoides =

Genus of crabs

Pleisticanthoides is a genus of crabs found in the western Pacific Ocean.

== Taxononomy ==
Pleisticanthoides was originally described by Yu Yokoya in 1933, but it was subsequently synonomized with Pleistacantha. It was revitalized as a valid genus in 2013 with the description of two new species.

== Species ==
Three species are recognised in this genus.

- Pleisticanthoides cameroni Ng & Richer de Forges, 2012
- Pleisticanthoides piccardorum Ng & Richer de Forges, 2012
- Pleisticanthoides simplex (Rathbun, 1932)
