= Pleistacantha exophthalmus =

Scientific classification
- Domain: Eukaryota
- Kingdom: Animalia
- Phylum: Arthropoda
- Class: Malacostraca
- Order: Decapoda
- Suborder: Pleocyemata
- Infraorder: Brachyura
- Family: Oregoniidae
- Genus: Pleistacantha
- Species: P. exophthalmus

Binomial name
- Pleistacantha exophthalmus Guinot & Richer De Forges, 1982

Species of crab

Pleistacantha exophthalmus is a species of spider crab.
