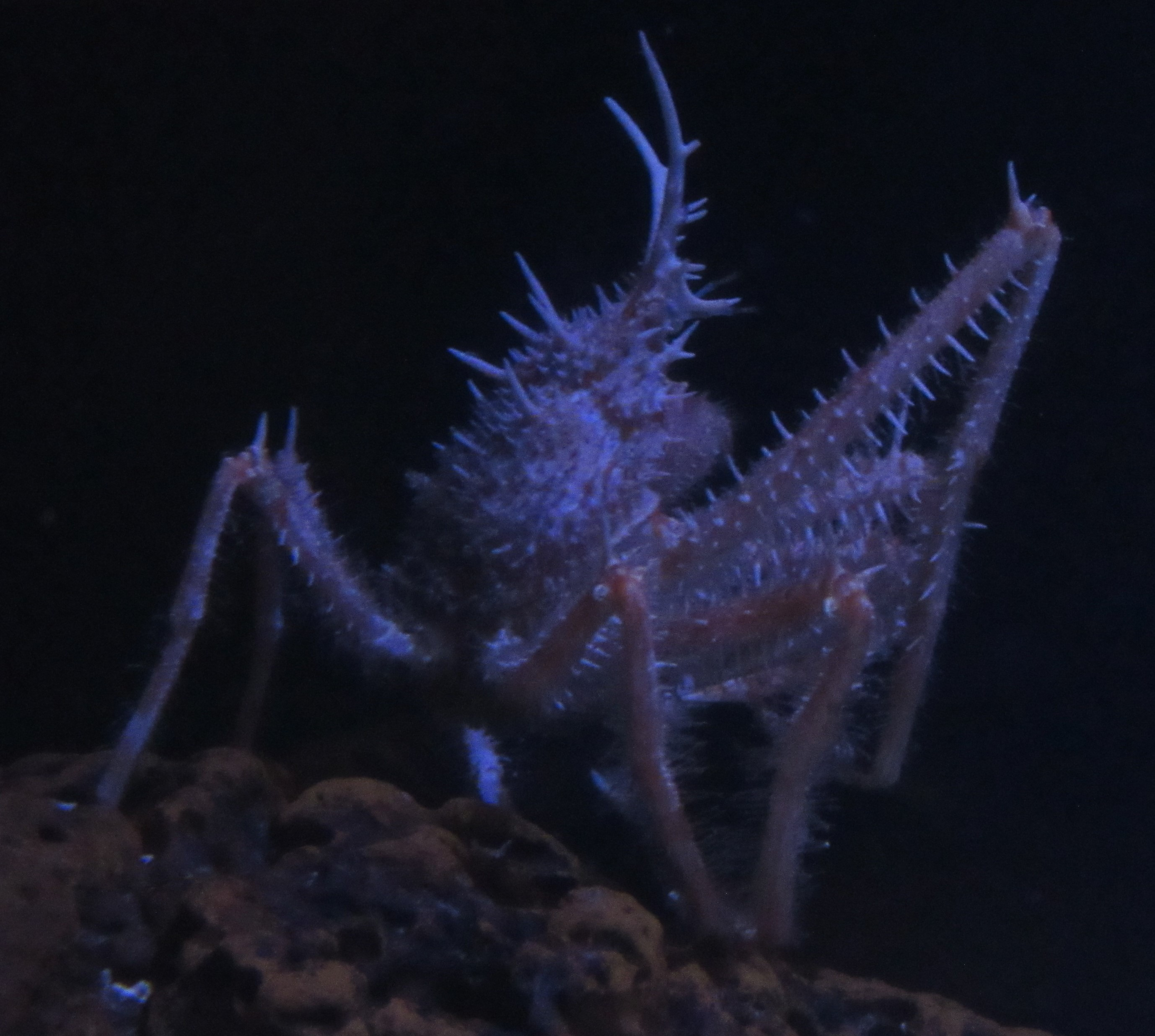
- A specimen in Takeeshima aquarium

Scientific classification
- Domain: Eukaryota
- Kingdom: Animalia
- Phylum: Arthropoda
- Class: Malacostraca
- Order: Decapoda
- Suborder: Pleocyemata
- Infraorder: Brachyura
- Family: Oregoniidae
- Genus: Pleistacantha
- Species: P. oryx

Binomial name
- Pleistacantha oryx Ortmann, 1893

= Pleistacantha oryx =

Species of crab

Pleistacantha oryx is a species of spider crab. It has a different distribution pattern from Pleistacantha maxima, with its range requiring clarification following the separation of these previously confused species.
