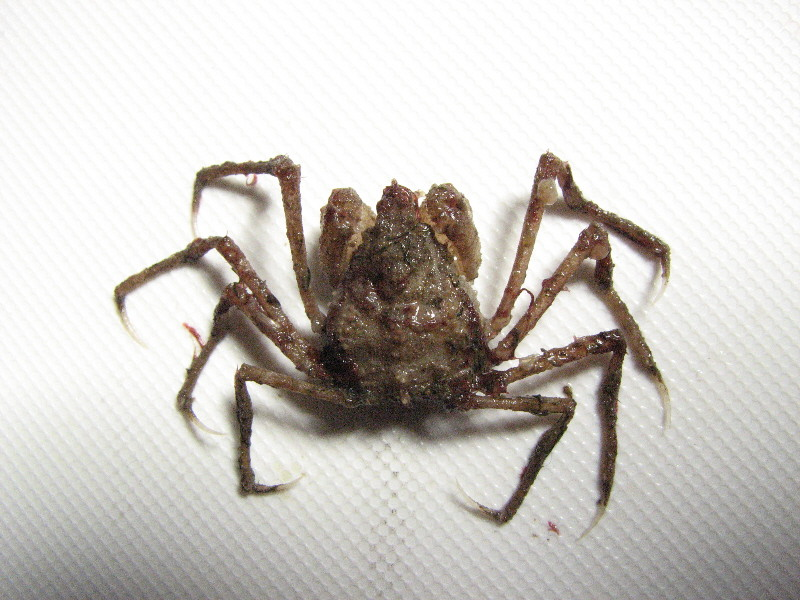

Scientific classification
- Kingdom: Animalia
- Phylum: Arthropoda
- Clade: Pancrustacea
- Class: Malacostraca
- Order: Decapoda
- Suborder: Pleocyemata
- Infraorder: Brachyura
- Family: Inachoididae
- Genus: Pyromaia
- Species: P. tuberculata

Binomial name
- Pyromaia tuberculata (Lockington, 1877)

Synonyms
- Inachus tuberculatus Lockington, 1877; Neorhynchus mexicanus Rathbun, 1894

= Pyromaia tuberculata =

Species of crab

Pyromaia tuberculata is a species of crab in the family Inachoididae.

== Taxonomy ==
Pyromaia tuberculata, also known as the fire crab, was first described by Lockington in 1877 off the coast of San Diego, California. The familial classification of pyromaia is currently still controversial. It was originally known as the Inachus tuberculata, and has also been referred to as Neorhynchus mexicanus. It is a member of the superfamily majoidea, also called “spider crabs”.

== Description ==
P. tuberculata is a benthic dwelling crab species, with adults often inhabiting continental shelves. Individuals of P. tuberculata have a granulate and tuberculate carapace, with a short, backwards facing spine on the first abdominal segment. The species undergoes nine post-larval stages each separated by brief periods of molting. Beginning at the third crab stage, mature females can be differentiated from males by the large rounded sodomites which make up their abdominal plates and form a cavity to hold eggs. The carapace length of adult specimens in the ninth crab stage can reach up to 20 mm while the carapace width can reach approximately 18 mm.

== Life cycle ==
The life cycle of P. tuberculata is made up of three main stages: the egg, larval, and crab. The incubation time of P. tuberculata eggs has an inverse relationship to the temperature in which the ovigerous females live, with eggs hatching after 7 days at 26 °C, and 80 days at 8 °C. Larvae are free floating and feed on brine shrimp and small plankton, undergoing regular intervals of molting. There are two zoeal and one megalopa stage for larval tuberculata, which can be distinguished through analysis of carapace spines and relative width. In the first zoeal stage the carapace has a singular dorsal spine and the eyes are sessile, whereas in the second zoeal stage there are multiple small dorsal spines and eyes are slightly stalked. In the megalopa stage, the carapace lacks spines but is larger and more prominently lobed. After reaching the initial crab stage, it takes approximately 3 months for P. tuberculata to reach adulthood. There is no clear difference in body size or weight between adult males and females. Males can begin to reproduce after 47–81 days, while female can reproduce after 62–79 days.

== Life history ==
P. tuberculata is characterized by a low number of post-larval stages which results in a shorter life span than other benthic crab species. This species also has a shorter larval phase, which is common in the Majidae family, and represents a greater degree of ecological specialization. It has a relatively short developmental stage and can reproduce year round. The ability of female crabs to carry fertilized eggs days after the puberty molt aids in shorter generation times. In combination with strategies leading to maximum offspring survival, such as a high larval dispersal area to areas of high oxygen, the year round reproduction of P. Tuberculata makes it so three generation cycles may take place each year. Females of the first generation lay eggs in early spring which reach maturity in late summer. This second generation releases eggs more quickly due to the warmer average water temperature, allowing for the third generation to settle and release eggs until early winter.

== Habitat ==
P. tuberculata is native to the pacific coast of North America from San Francisco Bay to Panama, but has spread to coastal waters of Argentina, Australia, Brazil, Japan, and New Zealand. Larvae float freely in coastal and estuarial waters up to 18 meters of depth. Adults live hidden among stones or on mud to sandy-mud bottoms up to depths of 412 meters. Adults and larvae were reported on the Atlantic Argentine continental shelf after previously only being observed in the Atlantic in the coastal waters of Brazil. P. tuberculata has now also spread to the western Pacific, as specimens of P. tuberculata have been found along the southeast coast of Australia in Port Phillip Bay and Newcastle, and along the western coast in Cockburn Sound. In the northwest pacific, populations of P. tuberculata have been established in the waters of China and Japan mostly due to naval shipping after World War II.

== Invasive species ==
P. tuberculata is considered an invasive species due to its spreading to the southeast Atlantic and western Pacific. After arriving in Japanese waters, P. tuberculata has thrived due to its ability to quickly recolonize waters following instances of summer hypoxia. Smaller, native crabs have limited breeding seasons which restrict their ability to compete with the invasive P. tuberculata. In eutrophic waters such as Tokyo Bay, P. tuberculata is abundant from the intertidal zone up to 80 meters of depth, with inner-bay populations being replenished each fall with larvae from crabs in the outer-bay, which do not experience the hypoxic die offs. Populations of P. tuberculata are limited in the shallow waters of Port Phillip Bay Australia due to predation by globefish.
