= Pleistacantha sanctijohannis =

Scientific classification
- Kingdom: Animalia
- Phylum: Arthropoda
- Clade: Pancrustacea
- Class: Malacostraca
- Order: Decapoda
- Suborder: Pleocyemata
- Infraorder: Brachyura
- Family: Oregoniidae
- Genus: Pleistacantha
- Species: P. sanctijohannis

Binomial name
- Pleistacantha sanctijohannis Miers, 1879

Species of crab

Pleistacantha sanctijohannis is a species of spider crab. It has been found in the Philippine Islands and Japan at depths of 83–106 fathoms (152–194 m; 498–636 ft).
