= Pleistacantha maxima =

Scientific classification
- Domain: Eukaryota
- Kingdom: Animalia
- Phylum: Arthropoda
- Class: Malacostraca
- Order: Decapoda
- Suborder: Pleocyemata
- Infraorder: Brachyura
- Family: Oregoniidae
- Genus: Pleistacantha
- Species: P. maxima

Binomial name
- Pleistacantha maxima Ahyong & Lee, 2006

Species of crab

Pleistacantha maxima is a species of spider crab. It ranges from Sagami Bay and Okinawa Island in Japan, through Taiwan and the Philippines, to Queensland in Australia. The species inhabits depths of 100–480 m (330–1,570 ft).

== Description ==
The carapace is pyriform with a postrostral carapace length 1.2–1.3 times the width. The postrostral carapace length to width ratio ranges from 1.24–1.34 (mean 1.27) for all specimens and 1.24–1.30 (mean 1.27) for mature specimens only. The gastric and branchial spines are proportionally much longer than in Pleistacantha oryx, being as long as or longer than the anterior hepatic spine.

Its walking legs are long and slender, decreasing in length posteriorly. P2 measures about 3.2–3.5 times the postrostral carapace length in males and 2.2–3.1 times in females. The interantennular spine is bifurcated in the distal third or quarter and divergent.
