= Pleistacantha cervicornis =

Scientific classification
- Domain: Eukaryota
- Kingdom: Animalia
- Phylum: Arthropoda
- Class: Malacostraca
- Order: Decapoda
- Suborder: Pleocyemata
- Infraorder: Brachyura
- Family: Oregoniidae
- Genus: Pleistacantha
- Species: P. cervicornis

Binomial name
- Pleistacantha cervicornis Ihle & Ihle-Landenberg, 1931

Species of crab

Pleistacantha cervicornis is a species of spider crab. It inhabits depths of 200–300 m (660–980 ft) and has a distribution range that includes Japan, the Philippines, Indonesia, Australia, and New Caledonia.

== Description ==
Its carapace is densely covered with numerous spines and spinules of similar lengths but consistent shape. The pair of long rostral spines adorned with spinules on all faces, The interantennular spine is simple, weakly upcurved, and not bifid. The eyestalks are slender and spinulous, while the basal antennal segment bears two distal spines, and the fourth and fifth antennal segments are covered with small spinules. The chelipeds are slender and heavily spinous, with cylindrical palms and long, slender fingers. The ambulatory legs are densely covered with long spines mixed with stiff bristles.
