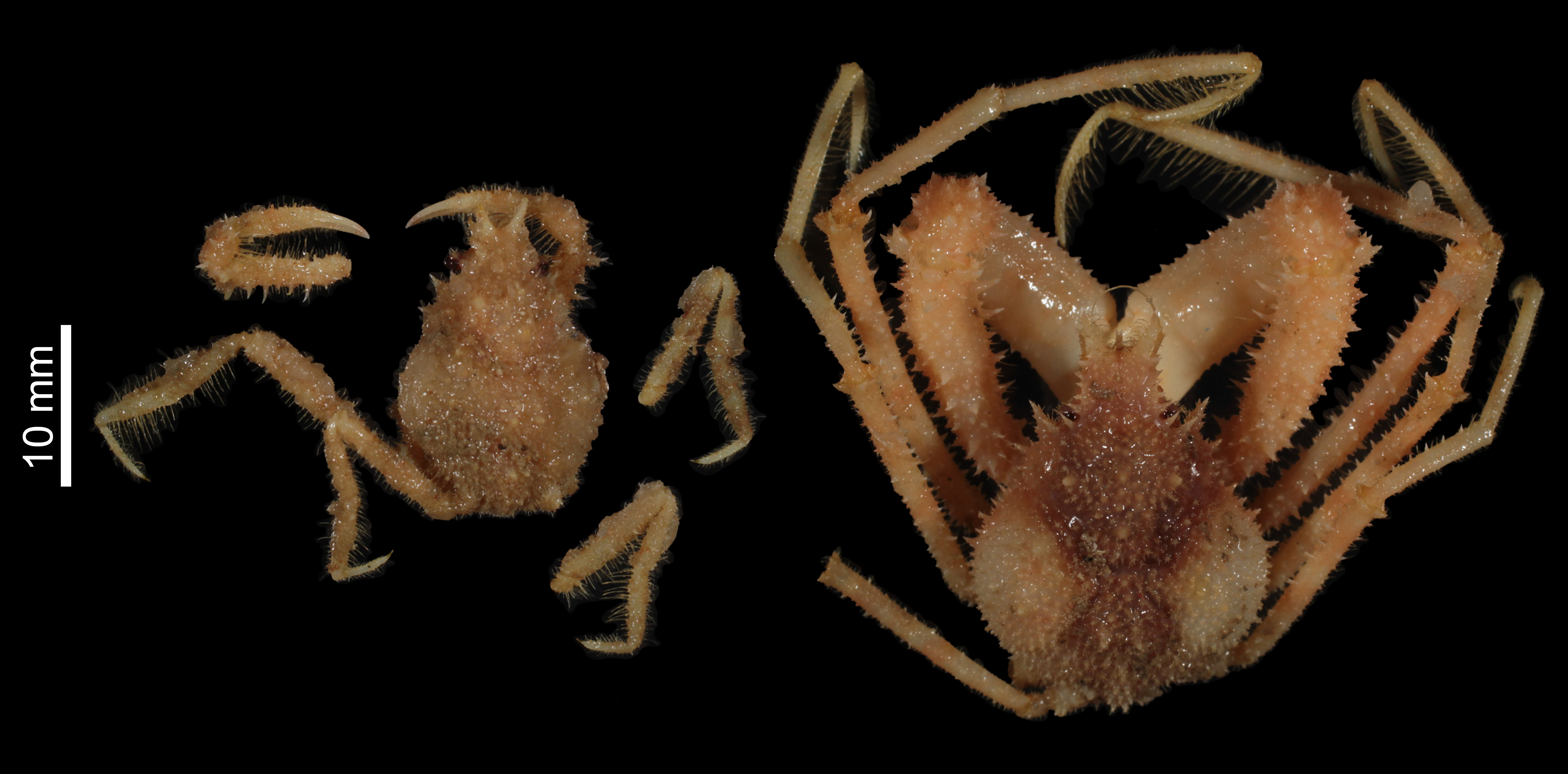

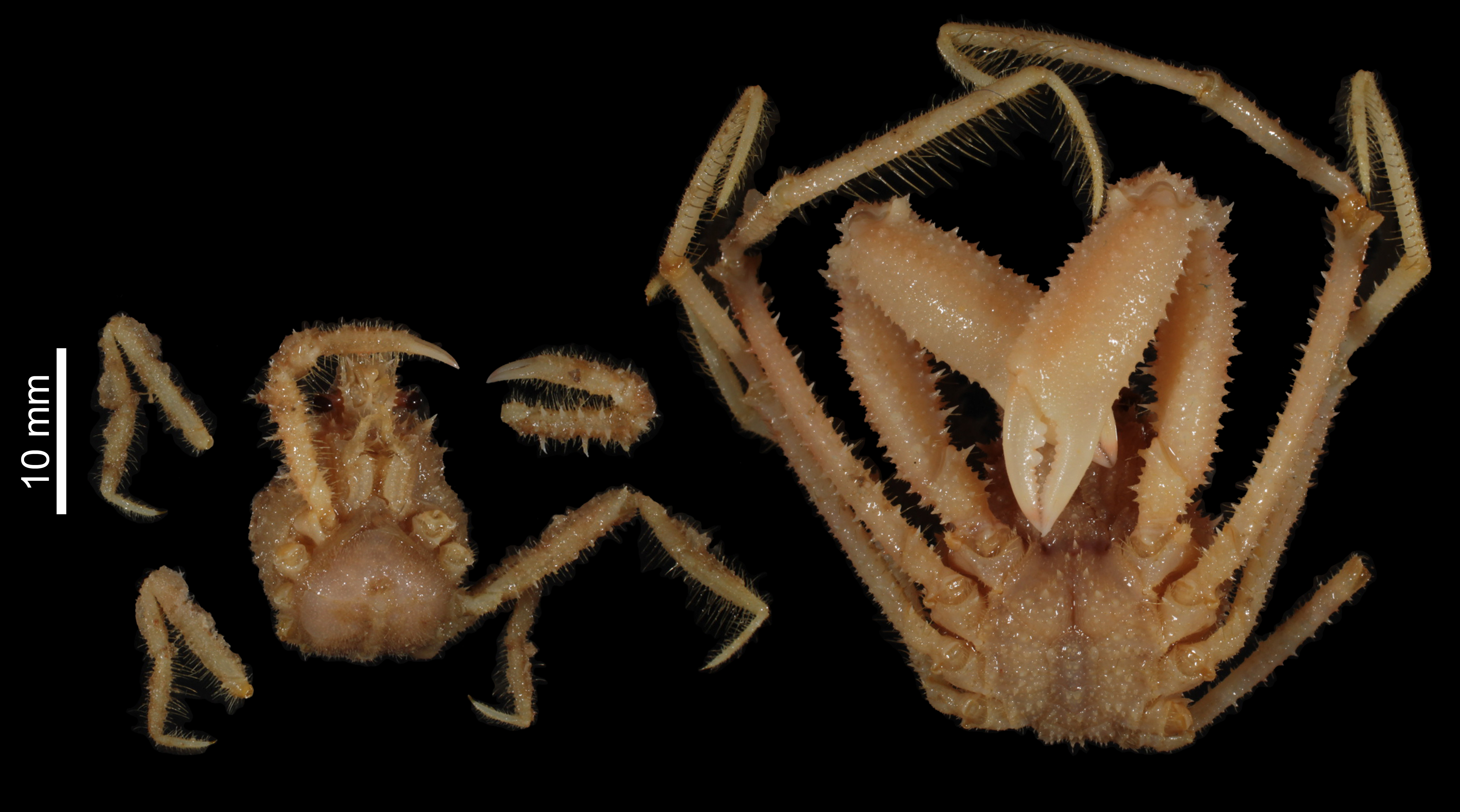

Scientific classification
- Kingdom: Animalia
- Phylum: Arthropoda
- Class: Malacostraca
- Order: Decapoda
- Suborder: Pleocyemata
- Infraorder: Brachyura
- Family: Oregoniidae
- Genus: Parapleisticantha; Yokoya, 1933

Type species
- Parapleisticantha japonica Yokoya, 1933

= Parapleisticantha =

Genus of crabs

Parapleisticantha is a genus of crabs in the family Oregoniidae. It has been found in Japan, the Philippines and the Indian Ocean, but the depth of this genus is not recorded.

== Description ==
Parapleisticantha has a pyriform carapace whose dorsal surface is covered in small spines. Its short rostrum comprises two horns, and its eyes are short with slender eyestalks.

== Species ==
Three species are recognized in this genus:

- Parapleisticantha aie Ng, Richer de Forges & Lee, 2023
- Parapleisticantha ludivinae Richer de Forges, Ng & Ahyong, 2013
- Parapleisticantha japonica Yokoya, 1933
