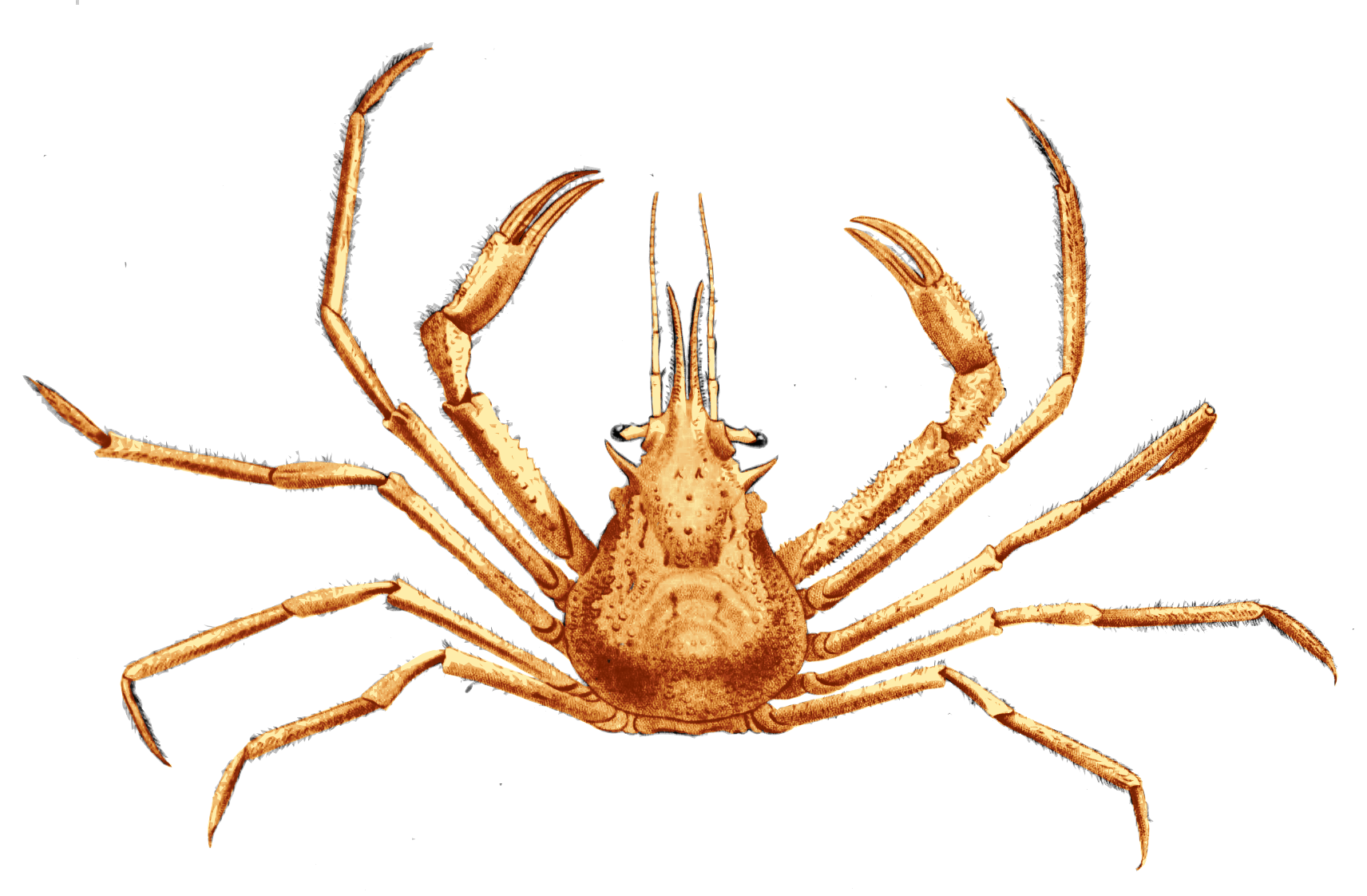
- 1855 illustration of Oregonia gracilis by James D. Dana

Scientific classification
- Domain: Eukaryota
- Kingdom: Animalia
- Phylum: Arthropoda
- Class: Malacostraca
- Order: Decapoda
- Suborder: Pleocyemata
- Infraorder: Brachyura
- Family: Oregoniidae
- Genus: Oregonia
- Species: O. gracilis

Binomial name
- Oregonia gracilis Dana, 1851

Synonyms
- Oregonia hirta Dana, 1851; Oregonia longimana Spence Bate, 1864; Oregonia mutsuensis Yokoya, 1933

= Oregonia gracilis =

Species of crab

Oregonia gracilis, commonly known as the graceful decorator crab, is a species of crab belonging to the family Oregoniidae. Like other decorator crabs it habitually attaches other organisms to its back. The sessile organisms are attached to hooked setae that act as a sort of velcro attachment. This decoration provides visual and chemical camouflage thus reducing predation risk. Pacific halibut are a major predator of O. gracilis. Other predators include octopus and sea otters. The main food source of O. gracilis is floating kelp and algae that they capture utilizing a waiting strategy in order to maintain cryptosis.

== Anatomy and physiology ==
Oregonia gracilis have three body segments: head, thorax and abdomen. Like many crustaceans, the head and thorax combine into a cephalothorax and are completely covered in a continuous exoskeleton called a carapace.

The carapace is heart shaped, a brown, tan or grey color and 5 cm in length with four pairs of long thin walking legs (pereiopods). A fifth pair of the pereiopods have pincers attached and are called chelipeds. The chelipeds are used for feeding, defense, and to decorate their bodies. The chelipeds are longer than the walking legs in males and shorter than the walking legs in females. The mouth has three pairs of feeding appendages called maxillipeds. Two long stalked compound eyes protrude from the cephalothorax. Behind each eye is a large and curved postorbital spine.

Using fine hooked setae found on the carapace, the crab liberally decorates itself with algae, sponges, bryozoans and hydroids. Its shell covered in sessile organisms makes the crab camouflaged to its environment. Juveniles and adult females decorate heavily whereas adult males are sparse in their decoration.

== Range and habitat ==
Oregonia gracilis live in the intertidal zone up to 436 meters deep. They can be found in the Bering Sea, the North Pacific Coast and Japan.

== Reproduction ==
For the majority of their lives, O. gracilis live by themselves except during mating season. Mates are found using chemical cues.

During the mating process the male uses the first and second abdominal appendages to transfer sperm packets called spermatophores to the female. The sperm fertilizes the egg which the females produce and carry on their setae. Recently hatched eggs are orange-red; eggs nearly ready to hatch are reddish-brown. The O. gracilia hatch in an advanced larval stage called zoea. Having developed compound eyes and a spiny carapace the zoea drift towards the surface. After the zoea phase, the larvae advance to the megalopa phase until finally reaching their adult form.
