= Oregonia =

Oregonia may refer to:

- Oregonia, Ohio
- Oregonia (crab), a genus of crabs
- Oregonian Biogeographic Province

== See also ==
- Oregon
