= Aepinus =

Aepinus may refer to:

- Aepinus (crater) named after Franz Aepinus
- Aepinus (crab), a genus of crabs
- Franz Ulrich Theodor Aepinus (1724–1802), a German natural philosopher
- Johannes Aepinus (Johann Hoeck) (1499–1553), a German Protestant theologian
