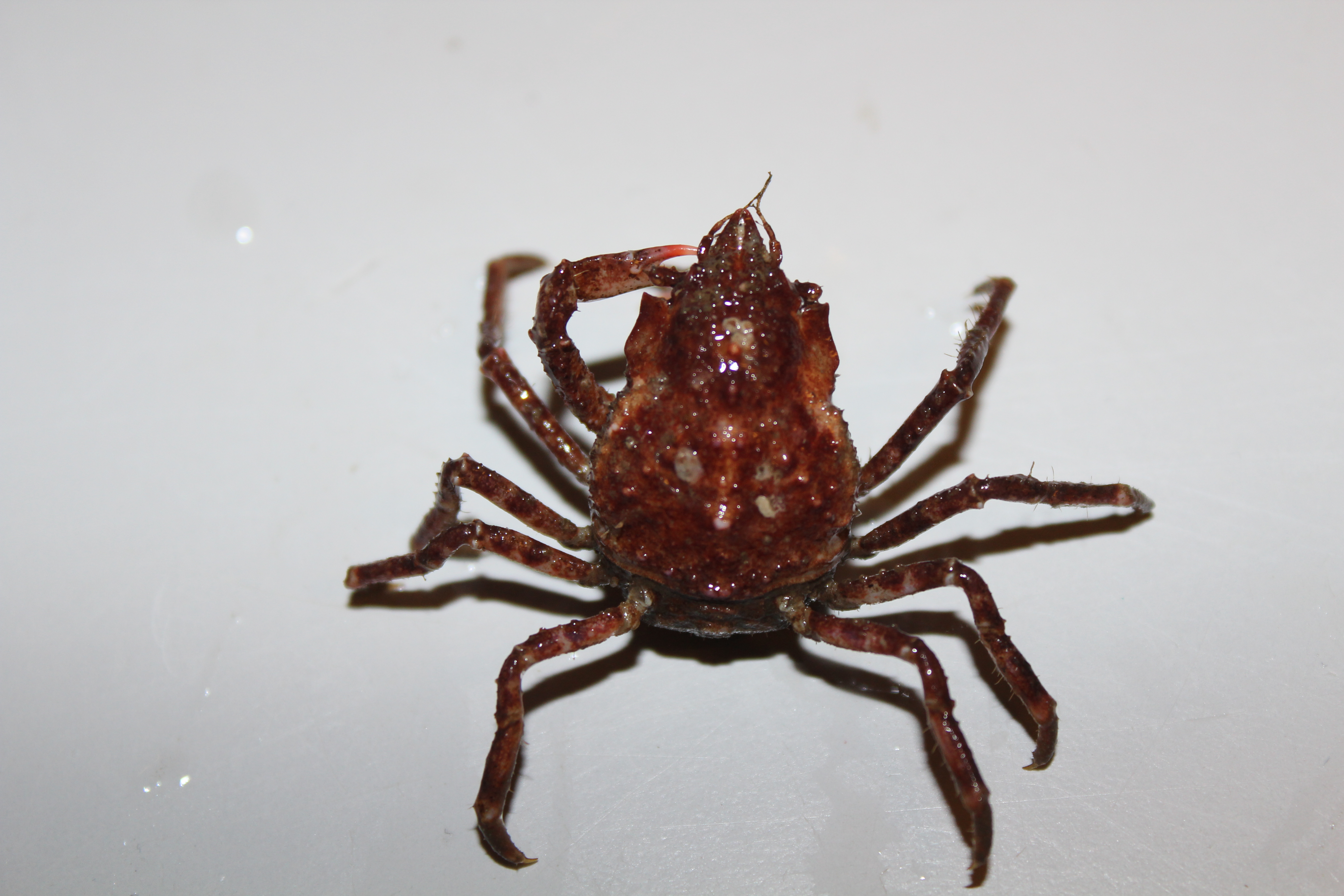
- Hyas coarctatus

Scientific classification
- Domain: Eukaryota
- Kingdom: Animalia
- Phylum: Arthropoda
- Class: Malacostraca
- Order: Decapoda
- Suborder: Pleocyemata
- Infraorder: Brachyura
- Family: Oregoniidae
- Genus: Hyas
- Species: H. coarctatus

Binomial name
- Hyas coarctatus Leach, 1815

= Hyas coarctatus =

Species of crab

Hyas coarctatus is a marine crab species native to the North Atlantic. It is characterized by a lyriformed shell.

== Morphology ==
Hyas coarctatus looks like the great spider crab (H. araneus) but has a lyriformed shell. The carapace of a large specimen is up to 60 mm long and 44 mm wide. The colour is grey-brown on the dorsal side, sometimes with a bit reddish, the ventral side is dirty white. The rostral horns of H. coarctatus are slightly longer and spaced further apart than in H. araneus. Chelipeds are longer than in H. araneus. The outer segment of the walking legs is often more or less furry.

== Distribution and ecology ==
Hyas coarctatus is found at both hard, stony, sandy and soft bottoms from 1 to 500 meters depth, though most often above 50 meters. H. araneus inhabits shallower depths. H. coarctatus is widely distributed in the North-East Atlantic and adjacent seas. The northern border is around the north and west coasts of Spitsbergen and Barents Sea, in the south it is found down to the north-east coast of France, and in the east to the Western Baltic Sea, the Belt Sea and the Öresund.
