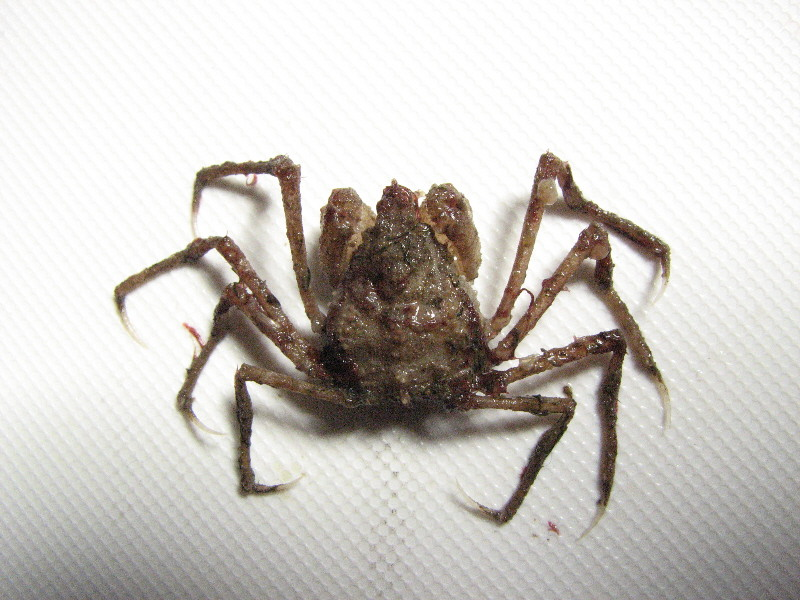
- Pyromaia tuberculata

Scientific classification
- Kingdom: Animalia
- Phylum: Arthropoda
- Clade: Pancrustacea
- Class: Malacostraca
- Order: Decapoda
- Suborder: Pleocyemata
- Infraorder: Brachyura
- Family: Inachoididae
- Genus: Pyromaia; Stimpson, 1871

= Pyromaia =

Genus of crabs

Pyromaia is a genus of crab in the family Inachoididae, containing the following species:

- Pyromaia acanthina Lemaitre, Campos & Bermúdez, 2001
- Pyromaia arachna Rathbun, 1924
- Pyromaia cuspidata Stimpson, 1871
- Pyromaia mexicana Rathbun, 1893
- Pyromaia propinqua Chace, 1940
- Pyromaia tuberculata (Lockington, 1877)
- Pyromaia vogelsangi Türkay, 1968
