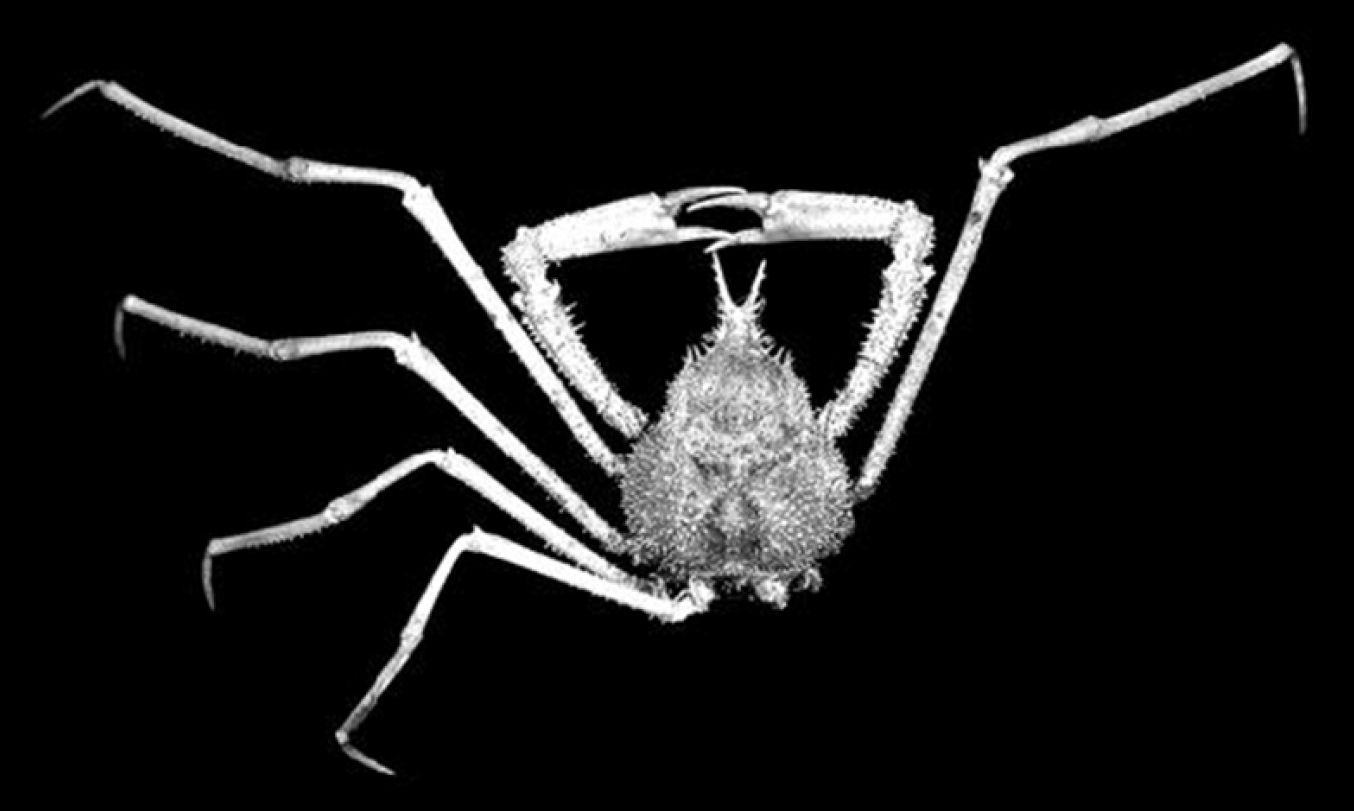

Scientific classification
- Domain: Eukaryota
- Kingdom: Animalia
- Phylum: Arthropoda
- Class: Malacostraca
- Order: Decapoda
- Suborder: Pleocyemata
- Infraorder: Brachyura
- Family: Oregoniidae
- Genus: Pleistacantha
- Species: P. pungens

Binomial name
- Pleistacantha pungens (Wood-Mason & Alcock, 1891)

Synonyms
- Echinoplax pungens Wood-Mason in Wood-Mason & Alcock, 1891

= Pleistacantha pungens =

Species of crab

Pleistacantha pungens is a species of spider crab.
