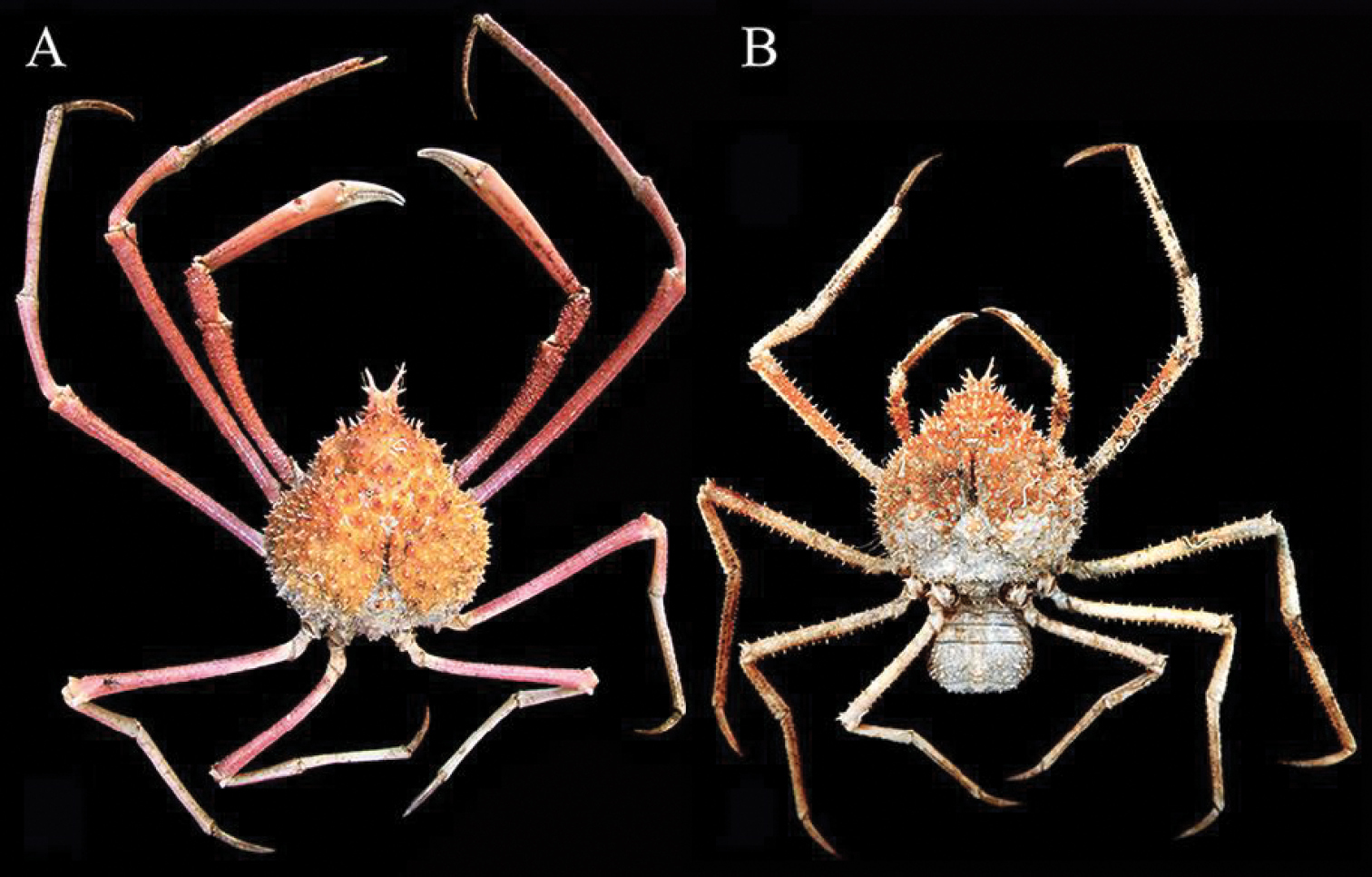
- Pleistacantha kannu A. male, B. female

Scientific classification
- Domain: Eukaryota
- Kingdom: Animalia
- Phylum: Arthropoda
- Class: Malacostraca
- Order: Decapoda
- Suborder: Pleocyemata
- Infraorder: Brachyura
- Family: Oregoniidae
- Genus: Pleistacantha; Miers, 1879

Type species
- Pleistacantha sanctijohannis Miers, 1879

Synonyms
- Echinoplax Miers, 1885

= Pleistacantha =

Genus of crabs

Pleistacantha is a genus of crabs in the family Oregoniidae. The genus occurs throughout many coasts in Europe, Africa, Asia, and Oceania.

== Description ==
Pleistacantha has a pyriform carapace which is longer than it is wide – at most 146 mm (5.7 in) long. The carapace is densely covered by spines and granules, and its walking legs are lined with spines and spinules. Its first pair of gonopods is slender and, like in all oregoniid crabs, features a longitudinal groove. Males have a tapered abdomen, and depending on the species, the sixth abdominal segment and the telson may be either separate or fused together.

== Taxonomy ==
Pleistacantha was described by zoologist Edward J. Miers in 1879. Its name is derived from the Greek roots pleistos (πλεῖστος), a superlative meaning "many", and acantha (άκανθα), meaning "spine". In 2013, evidence that the family Inachoididae was not monophyletic prompted carcinologists to move Pleistacantha and several other genera into the family Oregoniidae.

== Species ==
The following species are recognized in this genus:

- Pleistacantha cervicornis Ihle & Ihle-Landenberg, 1931
- Pleistacantha exophthalmus Guinot & Richer de Forges, 1982
- Pleistacantha griffini Ahyong & T Lee, 2006
- Pleistacantha kannu Ng, Ravinesh & Ravichandran, 2017
- Pleistacantha maxima Ahyong & T Lee, 2006
- Pleistacantha moseleyi (Miers, 1885)
- Pleistacantha naresii (Miers, 1885)
- Pleistacantha ori Ahyong & Ng, 2007
- Pleistacantha oryx Ortmann, 1893
- Pleistacantha pungens (Wood-Mason, 1891)
- Pleistacantha rubida (Alcock, 1895)
- Pleistacantha sanctijohannis Miers, 1879
- Pleistacantha stilipes Ahyong, Chen & Ng, 2005
