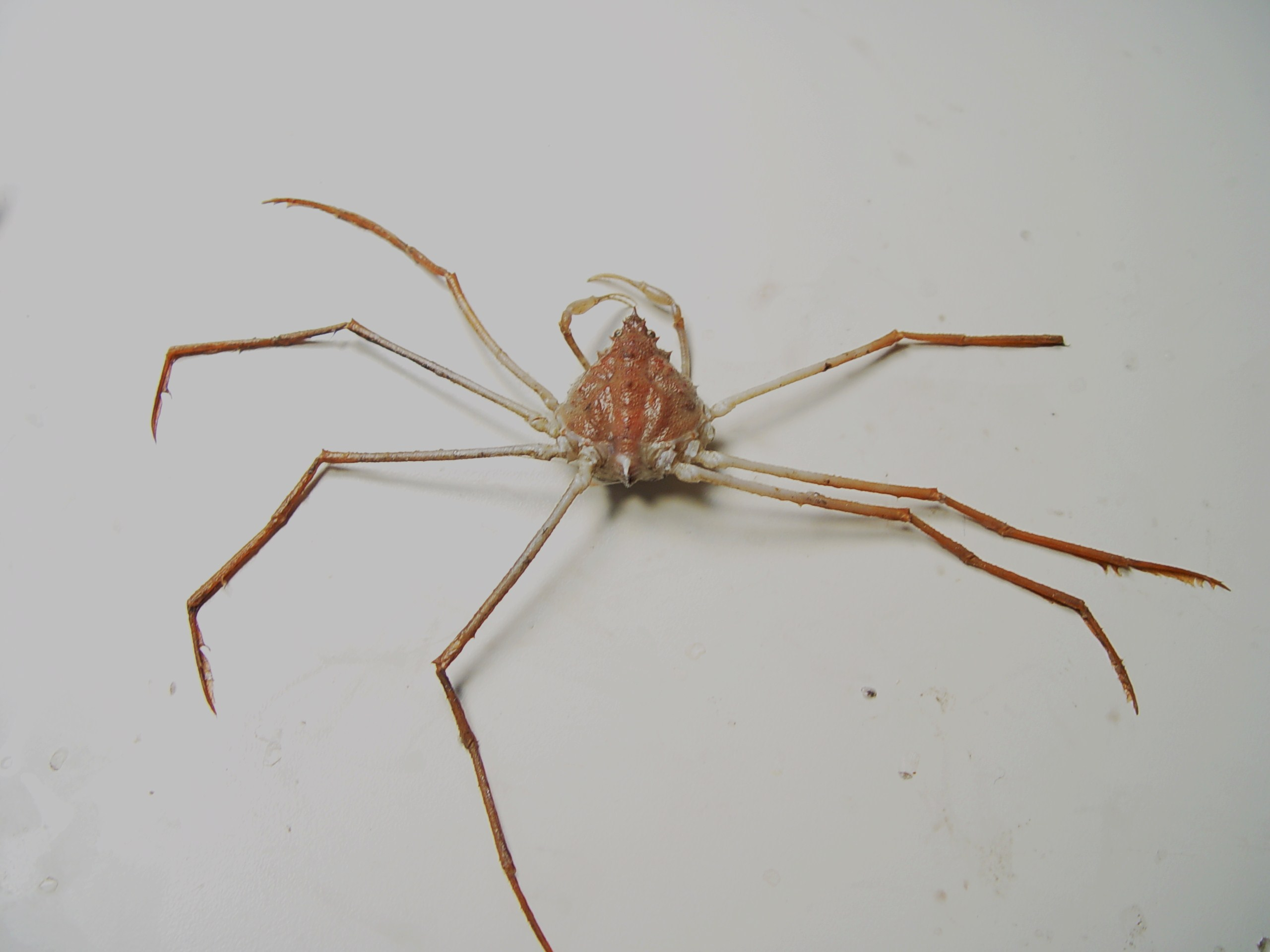

Scientific classification
- Kingdom: Animalia
- Phylum: Arthropoda
- Clade: Pancrustacea
- Class: Malacostraca
- Order: Decapoda
- Suborder: Pleocyemata
- Infraorder: Brachyura
- Family: Inachoididae
- Genus: Anasimus
- Species: A. latus

Binomial name
- Anasimus latus Rathbun, 1894

= Anasimus latus =

Species of crab

Anasimus latus is a species of crab in the family Inachoididae.

== Description ==
The carapace of this species has a broadly ovate shape, is rough in texture, and contains spines. It has a median row of five spines. At the distal end of the first abdominal segment, there is a long spine that points backward from the distal end.

Anasimus latus has very long legs compared to the body. The carapace is less than half the length of the chelipeds in male specimens. There is a double fringe of hairs present on the last two segments of the walking legs.

This species appears similar to Pyromaia cuspidata.

== Distribution and ecology ==
Anasimus latus ranges along west coast of the Atlantic Ocean from the United States to South America. It is found from Cape Lookout in North Carolina to Florida, and south through the Gulf of Mexico down to Brazil. It also occurs in the West Indies.

This species lives in the sublittoral zone at depths of 27–274 metres (90–900 ft). It occurs on coarse sand, among coral, in coral sand, and also on mud and shell substrates.
