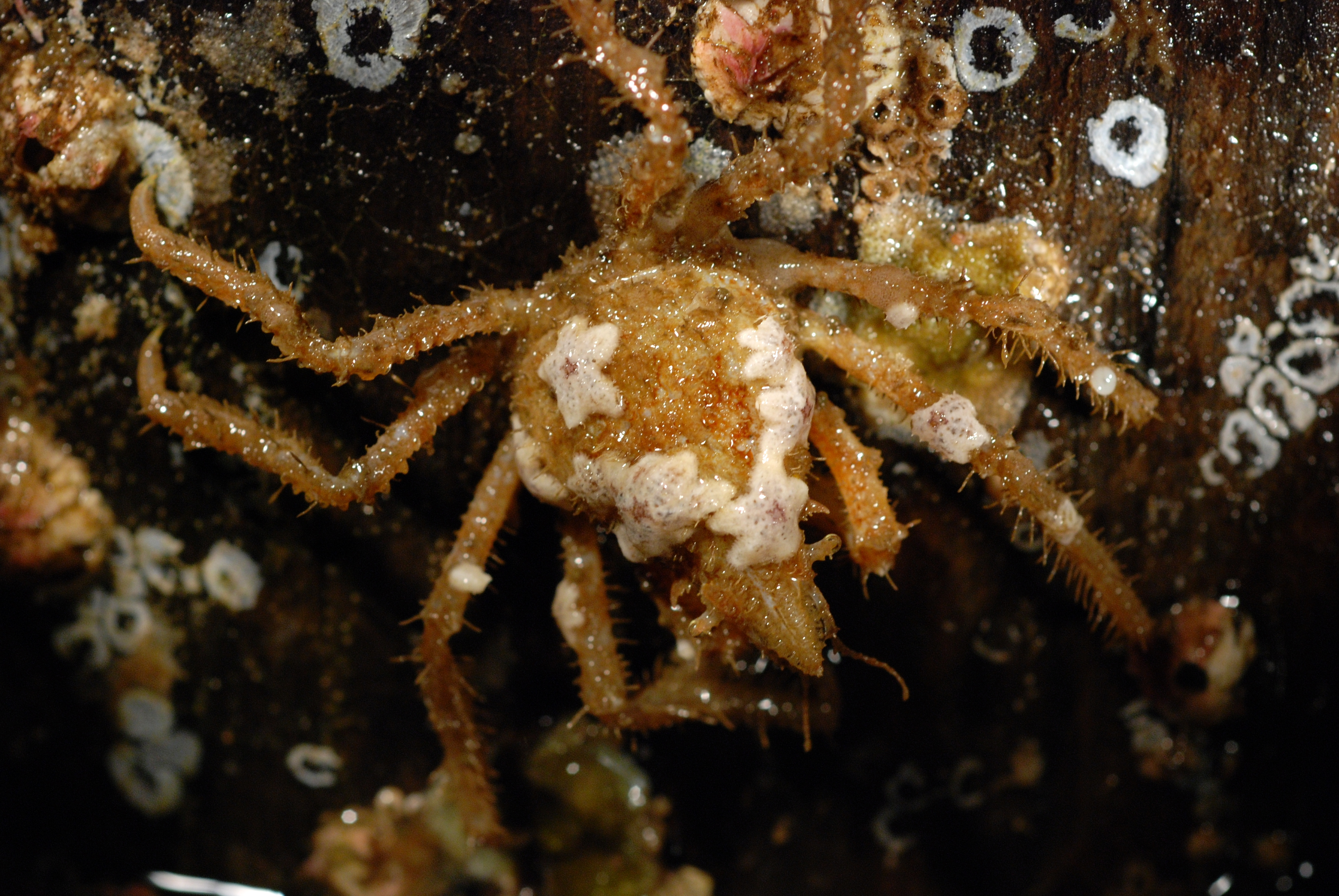
- Oregonia gracilis

Scientific classification
- Domain: Eukaryota
- Kingdom: Animalia
- Phylum: Arthropoda
- Class: Malacostraca
- Order: Decapoda
- Suborder: Pleocyemata
- Infraorder: Brachyura
- Family: Oregoniidae
- Genus: Oregonia; Dana, 1851

Type species
- Oregonia gracilis Dana, 1851

= Oregonia (crab) =

Oregonia Temporal range: Oligocene–Recent

Genus of crabs

Oregonia is a genus of crabs, comprising two extant species and one fossil species: It is classified in the family Oregoniidae under the spider crab superfamily Majoidea.

== Description ==
The members of the genus are characterized by subtriangular or suboblong carapaces moderately covered with small protrusions (tubercles). They have large spines on the rear margins of the eye orbits (the postorbital spine) that are situated quite far from the eyestalks. The male chelipeds are elongated. The palms (manus) of the claws are long, compressed, and widen on the outer ends. The walking legs (pereiopods) are slender and decrease in length regularly towards the back. The abdomen (pleon) has seven segments.

== Species ==
Three species are currently recognized under the genus:

- Oregonia bifurca Rathbun, 1902 – the split-nose crab, found in deep waters of the northern Pacific Ocean, from the Bering Sea to the waters off British Columbia
- Oregonia gracilis Dana, 1851 – the graceful decorator crab, found in shallow waters of the northern Pacific Ocean, from off Japan to the waters off California
- †Oregonia spinifera Schweitzer, Feldmann, González-Barba & Vega, 2002 – a fossil species from the Oligocene El Cien Formation of Baja California, Mexico

The previously described species O. longimana, O. mutsuensis and O. hirta have all been subsumed into O. gracilis. O. hirta in particular was misidentified as a separate species due to the sexual dimorphism exhibited by majoid crabs. They were actually the females of O. gracilis.

== See also ==
- Decorator crab
