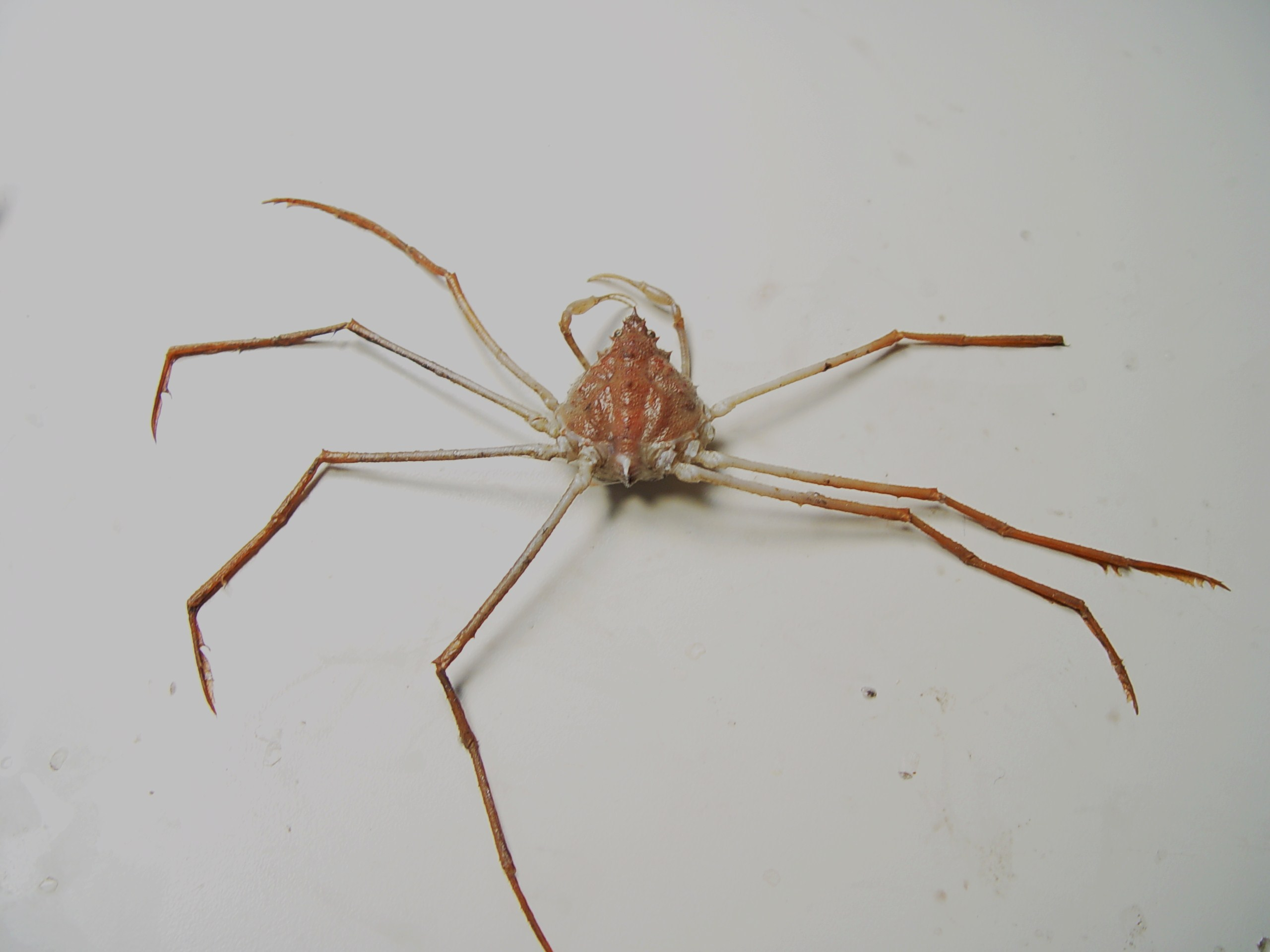
- Anasimus latus

Scientific classification
- Kingdom: Animalia
- Phylum: Arthropoda
- Clade: Pancrustacea
- Class: Malacostraca
- Order: Decapoda
- Suborder: Pleocyemata
- Infraorder: Brachyura
- Family: Inachoididae
- Genus: Anasimus; A. Milne-Edwards, 1880

= Anasimus =

Genus of crabs

Anasimus is a genus of crab in the family Inachoididae, containing two species:

- Anasimus fugax A. Milne-Edwards, 1880
- Anasimus latus Rathbun, 1894
