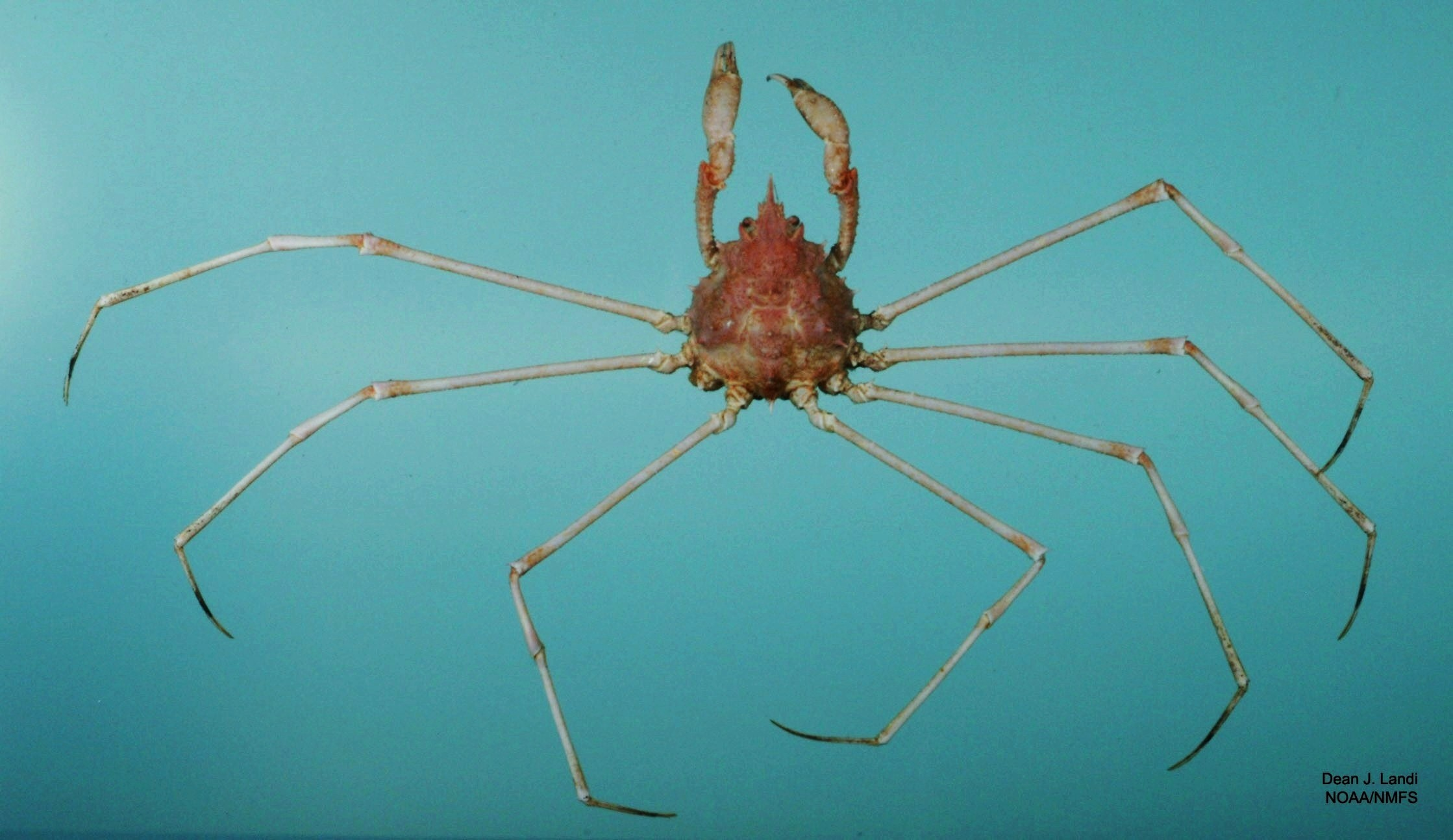

Scientific classification
- Kingdom: Animalia
- Phylum: Arthropoda
- Clade: Pancrustacea
- Class: Malacostraca
- Order: Decapoda
- Suborder: Pleocyemata
- Infraorder: Brachyura
- Family: Inachoididae
- Genus: Pyromaia
- Species: P. cuspidata

Binomial name
- Pyromaia cuspidata Stimpson, 1871

Synonyms
- Inachoides brevirostrum Lockington, 1877; Inachoides magdalenensis Rathbun, 1894

= Pyromaia cuspidata =

Species of crab

Pyromaia cuspidata, also known as the dartnose pear crab, is a species of crab in the family Inachoididae. This crab appears similar to Anasimus latus. It is a long-legged crab with a trident-shaped rostrum, and occurs in Atlantic waters from North Carolina to west Florida, and in the Gulf of Mexico through the Yucatán Peninsula down to Nicaragua. It is also found in Cuban waters. This species lives in depths of 27–549 metres (89–1,801 ft) on bottoms of mud, sand, or pebbles.
