= Paulita Sedgwick =

American actress

- Born: December 7, 1943
- Died: December 18, 2009 (aged 66)
- Occupations: Artist; Actress; Independent filmmaker

Paulita Sedgwick (December 7, 1943 – December 18, 2009) was an artist, actress, and independent filmmaker best known for her performances on stage and roles in several films by Ismail Merchant and James Ivory.

== Early life ==
Paulita Sedgwick was born on December 7, 1943, in Washington, D.C., the second of five children of Samuel Cabot Sedgwick and Paula Knipe Sedgwick.

In her teenage years she studied Islamic Art at the University of Madrid in Spain, where she lived with the family of the anti-Francist Dionisio Ridruejo, reportedly drawing the attention of the authorities (although this is not substantiated).

Later she attended the Webber Douglas School of Singing and Dramatic Art in London, England, lodging with the family of Colonel Sir Piers Bengough.

=== Family ===
The Sedgwick family were well established in Massachusetts, and she was descended from Robert Sedgwick, the first Major General of the Massachusetts Bay Colony under Oliver Cromwell, William Ellery, who was a signatory of the United States Declaration of Independence, Judge Theodore Sedgwick, famously the first person to successfully plead for the freedom of a female slave (Elizabeth Freeman, also known as Mum Bett), and was related to Catharine Sedgwick, the novelist. She was also a cousin of the actresses Edie Sedgwick and Kyra Sedgwick, and her grandfather Ellery Sedgwick was the editor and then owner of The Atlantic magazine.

Sedgwick's father served as a diplomat with the US State Department, and her early years were spent in Haiti, Spain, France, Colombia, Costa Rica, Japan, and the United States. During this time she learned to speak fluent Spanish and began a lifelong interest in travel and foreign cultures.

== Adult life and career ==
=== 1970s ===
Her interest in Islamic and other ancient arts was part of a greater fascination with antiquity and mythology, which Sedgwick used as inspiration for her own art. She wrote and illustrated two books which saw commercial success in the US during the 1970s, Circus ABC and Mythological Creatures, and also illustrated two more: A to Z of Egyptian Mythology by Barbara Pradel Price and The Pluperfect of Love by Dorothy Crayder.

In the early 1970s Sedgwick moved to New York City, where she became a member of a fringe theatre group called the Hot Peaches and performed in numerous stage productions.

During this time she became a lifelong friend of Isabelle Collin Dufresne (better known as Ultra Violet), and through Dufresne and her cousin Edie Sedgwick got to know Andy Warhol, although she never became a follower of The Factory. While in New York she dated Jimmy Hall, another stage actor, and in 1974 they had a son, Angel Sedgwick, who was to be her only child. During the mid 70s, Sedgwick and her son moved to Europe, where she spent a year travelling and performing street theatre.

In 1977, they moved to Paris, where she learned French and began acting in films as well as stage productions, including supporting roles in Savages (1971), Quartet (1981), Les Uns et Les Autres (1981) and The Bunker (1981).

=== 1980s ===
Throughout most of her adult life Sedgwick lived on the family's Santa Fe Ranch near Nogales, Arizona, but travelled extensively throughout South and Central America, Europe, the former Soviet Union, North Africa and Southeast Asia. From the early 1980s onwards she was an increasingly regular visitor to London, England, and became a doyenne of London's alternative scene while also becoming a member of such diverse institutions as the Royal Geographical Society, the Royal Horticultural Society, The Chelsea Arts Club, the National Liberal Club, the Soho social club Black's, and gay nightclubs such as Heaven and Madame Jojo's.

She founded and edited a short-lived underground culture magazine called U-Topic, and her friends and acquaintances during this period included the fashion designers Vivienne Westwood, Pam Hogg and Alexander McQueen.

Inspired by the places she visited during her travels, the people she met there and local folklore, Sedgwick wrote, produced and directed a number of her own films under the company name Poker Productions, sometimes using the nom-de-plume Damian Wong. These included the short films Le Gymnase De La Rue D'Enfer (1984, in French), The Cowboy and the Chinagirl (1987), Valentin (1989, in Spanish), and The Yellow Motel (1991).

In 1992, she wrote, produced and directed the feature film Blackout, which featured a soundtrack by the then unknown British dance music artist Jake Williams. Several of these films featured luminaries from the 1970s New York theatre and art scene such as Ultra Violet, and proponents of the London alternative scene including Eddie Tudor-Pole, the artist Duggie Fields and the jewellery designer Andrew Logan. Despite obtaining varying degrees of underground popularity none of these films met with any commercial success. In 1995, she made a set of four three-minute films for the British TV company Channel 4 called On The Loose, Fit To Be Tied (starring fashion designer Alexander McQueen), Double Take, and The Assistant (starring the TV presenter Graham Norton); however, these films were never shown on British television.

== Ranch life and death ==
From the early 1990s she began to spend more and more time on her family's ranch in Arizona, where she became a member of the board on the Santa Fe Ranch Foundation, the Sedgwick family's non-profit trust, assisting with the delivery of educational programmes for local school children. After a protracted battle with several cancers she died on the Santa Fe Ranch on December 18, 2009.
