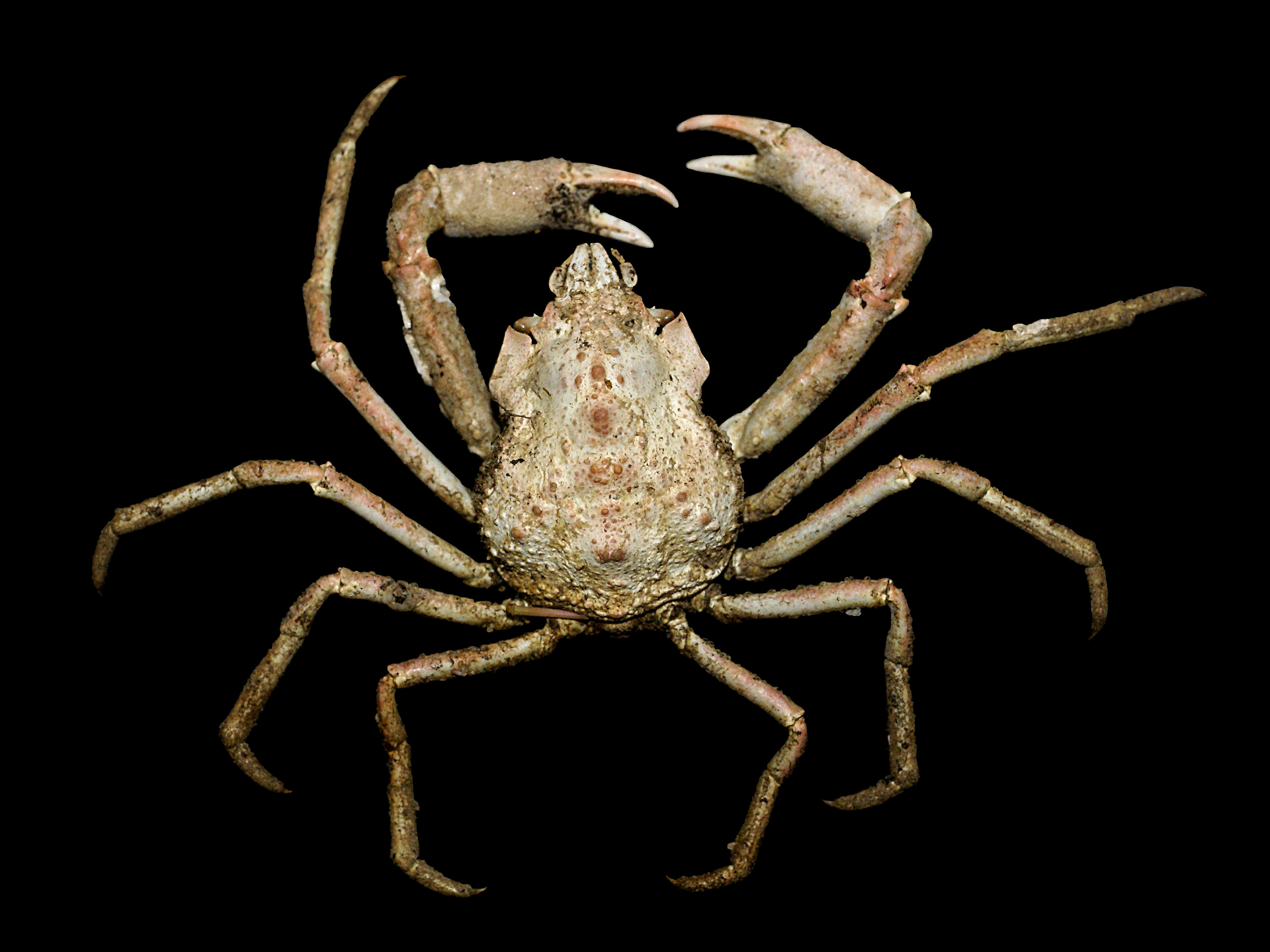
- Hyas coarctatus

Scientific classification
- Domain: Eukaryota
- Kingdom: Animalia
- Phylum: Arthropoda
- Class: Malacostraca
- Order: Decapoda
- Suborder: Pleocyemata
- Infraorder: Brachyura
- Family: Oregoniidae
- Genus: Hyas; Leach, 1814

Type species
- Cancer araneus Linnaeus, 1758

= Hyas (crab) =

Genus of crabs

Hyas is a genus of oregoniid crabs comprising five extant species:

- Hyas alutaceus Brandt, 1851
- Hyas araneus (Linnaeus, 1758)
- Hyas coarctatus Leach, 1815
- Hyas lyratus Dana, 1851
- Hyas ursinus Rathbun, 1924
