= Aepinus (crab) =

Scientific classification
- Domain: Eukaryota
- Kingdom: Animalia
- Phylum: Arthropoda
- Class: Malacostraca
- Order: Decapoda
- Suborder: Pleocyemata
- Infraorder: Brachyura
- Family: Inachoididae
- Genus: Aepinus; Rathbun, 1897

Genus of crustaceans

Aepinus is a genus of crabs belonging to the family Inachoididae.

The species of this genus are found in Central America.

Species:

- Aepinus septemspinosus (Milne-Edwards, 1878)
