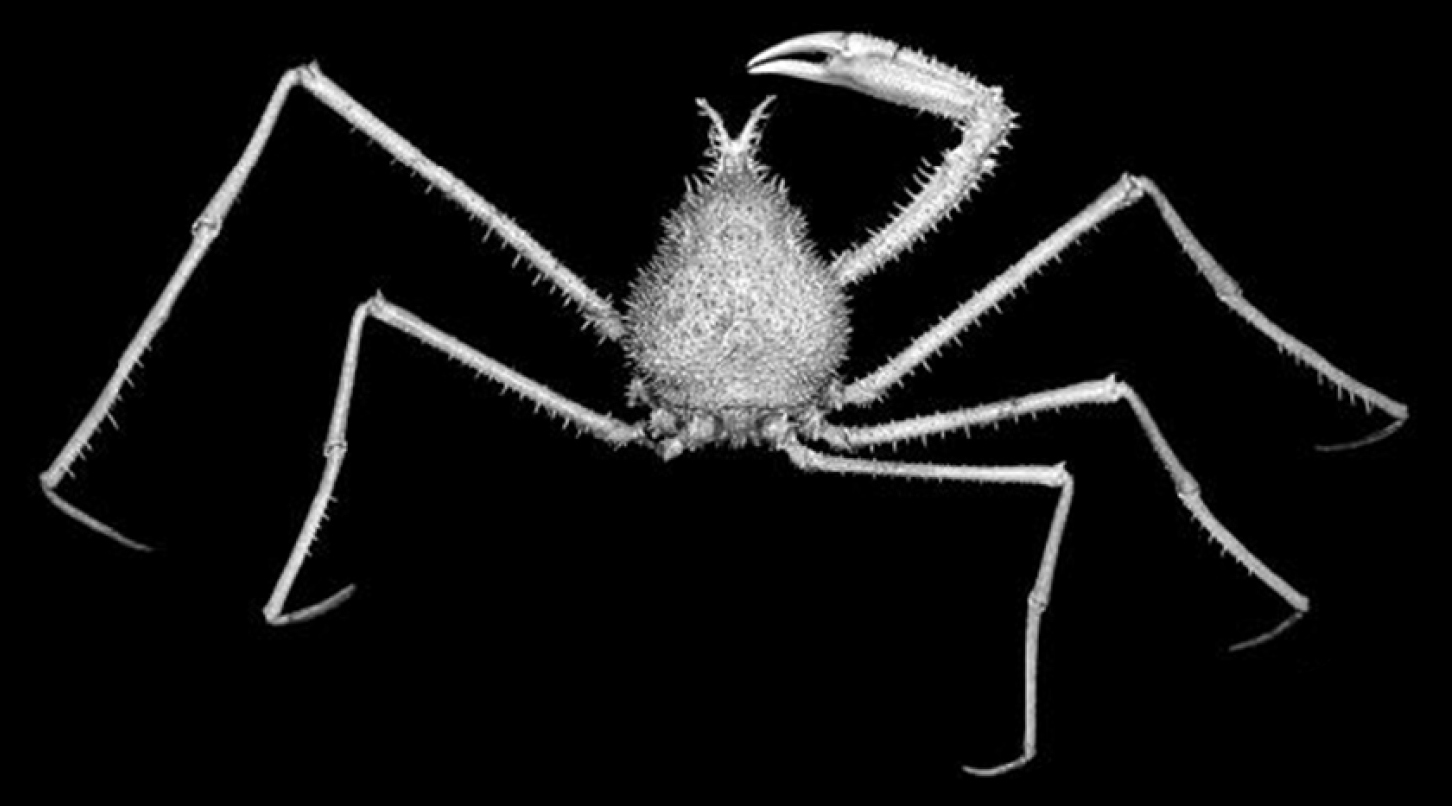

Scientific classification
- Kingdom: Animalia
- Phylum: Arthropoda
- Class: Malacostraca
- Order: Decapoda
- Suborder: Pleocyemata
- Infraorder: Brachyura
- Family: Oregoniidae
- Genus: Pleistacantha
- Species: P. moseleyi

Binomial name
- Pleistacantha moseleyi (Miers, 1885)

Synonyms
- Echinoplax moseleyi Miers, 1885

= Pleistacantha moseleyi =

Species of crab

Pleistacantha moseleyi is a species of crab found in the seas of Southeast Africa, at depths of 330–430 m (1,080–1,410 ft).

== Description ==
It has an orange to orange red colour, with a roughly pear-shaped carapace. It has been covered by small, sharp acute spines covering over the dorsal carapace and its walking pair of legs. Its rostral spine is half the pre-rostral carapace, being distinctively curving. The gastric region is gently swollen, with the third maxiliped being ischiumly elongated.
