= Paulita (plant) =

Scientific classification
- Kingdom: Plantae
- Clade: Tracheophytes
- Clade: Angiosperms
- Clade: Eudicots
- Clade: Asterids
- Order: Apiales
- Family: Apiaceae
- Genus: Paulita; Soják

Synonyms
- Neopaulia Pimenov & Kljuykov, Bot. Zhurn. (Moscow & Leningrad) 68: 1562 (1983), nom. superfl.; Paulia Korovin, Izv. Akad. Nauk Tadzhiksk. S.S.R., Otd. Biol. Nauk 1(50): 14 (1973), nom. illeg.

Genus of plants

Paulita is a genus of flowering plants belonging to the family Apiaceae.

Its native range is Central Asia and it is found in Kyrgyzstan and Tadzhikistan.

The genus name of Paulita is in honour of Pavel Nikolaevich Ovczinnikov or Paul Ovczinnikov (1903–1979), who was a Russian botanist, specialist in grasses, who in 1945 was the Director of the Botanical Institute at the Academcy of Sciences in Tajikistan.

The genus was circumscribed by Jiří Soják in Čas. Nár. Muz. Praze, Rada Přír. vol.150 on page 216 in (1981, publ. 1982).

== Species ==
As accepted by Plants of the World Online:

- Paulita alaica (Pimenov & Kljuykov) Pimenov & Kljuykov
- Paulita alpina (Schischk.) Soják
- Paulita ovczinnikovii (Korovin) Soják
