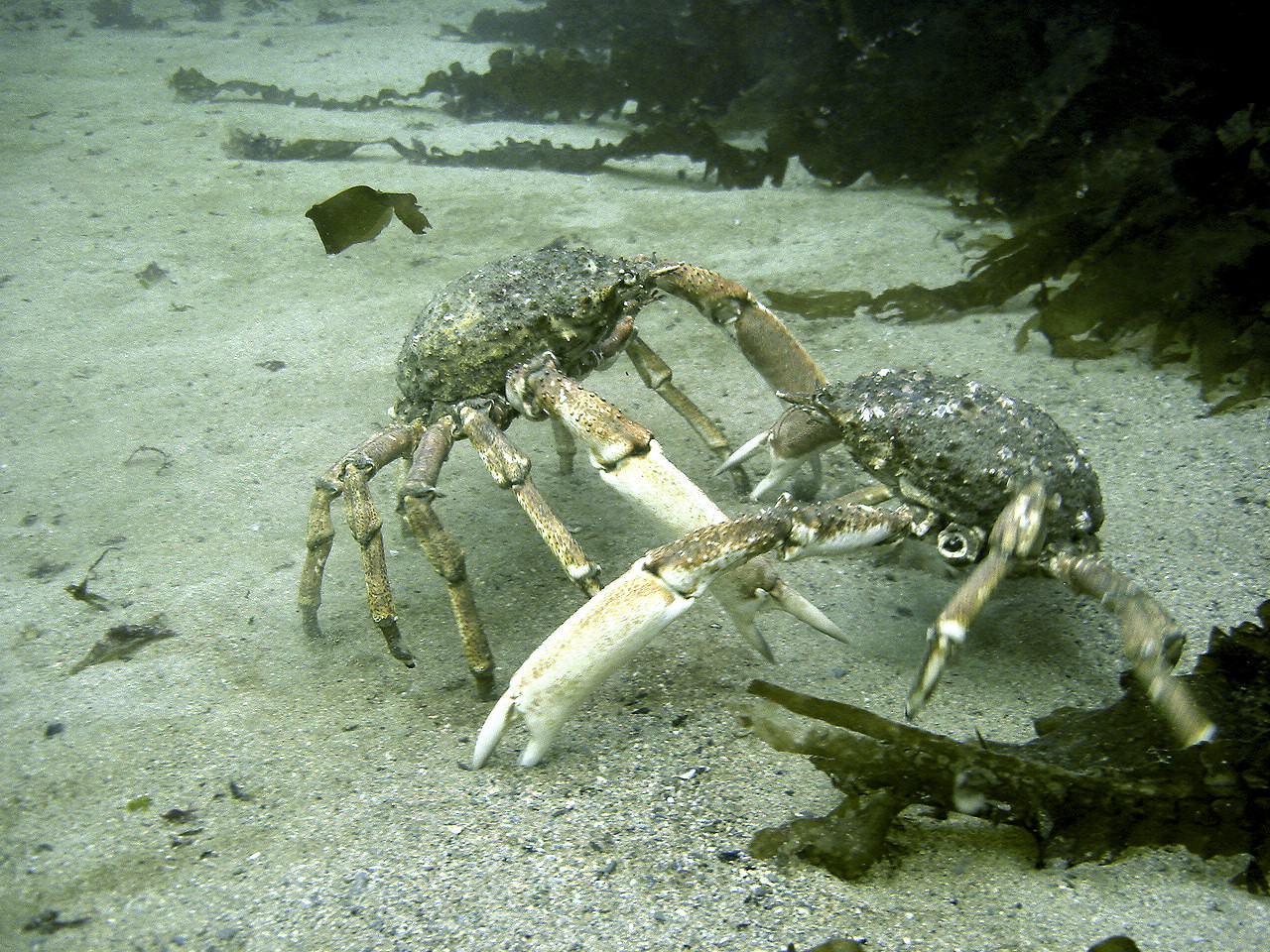

Scientific classification
- Kingdom: Animalia
- Phylum: Arthropoda
- Clade: Pancrustacea
- Class: Malacostraca
- Order: Decapoda
- Suborder: Pleocyemata
- Infraorder: Brachyura
- Family: Oregoniidae
- Genus: Hyas
- Species: H. araneus

Binomial name
- Hyas araneus (Linnaeus, 1758)

= Great spider crab =

Species of crab

The great spider crab (Hyas araneus) is a species of crab found in northeast Atlantic waters and the North Sea, usually below the tidal zone.

In 1986, two specimens were captured at the South Shetland Islands off the Antarctic Peninsula, apparently transported by human agency. It has been feared that the species would have an adverse effect on the native fauna, but there have been no further captures from the region since the 1986 specimens.

The great spider crab can moult and get rid of its outer shell/skin. This can take some time but it lets it grow to great size. After it moults it is very vulnerable to predators because its new exoskeleton takes time to harden.
