= Yu Yokoya =

- 横屋猷
- Born: 5 August 1891; Takahashi, Okayama, Japan
- Died: 1969 (aged 77–78)
- Scientific career
- Fields: Marine biology
- Institutions: Tokyo Imperial University (Faculty of Agriculture); Nagasaki University

Yu Yokoya (1891–1969) was a Japanese marine biologist. He worked at least after 1917 on Japanese decapod crustaceans for the Fisheries Institute, Faculty of Agriculture, Tokyo Imperial University.

== Works ==
- "Some Rare and New Species of Decapod Crustaceans Found in the Vicinity of the Misaki Marine Biological Station" (PDF). Japanese Journal of Zoology. 7 (1): 129–146. 1936.
- "On the distribution of decapod crustaceans inhabiting the continental shelf around Japan, chiefly based upon the materials collected by S.S. Soyo-Maru, during the year 1923–1930". Journal of the College of Agriculture, Tokyo Imperial University. 12 (1): 1–226. 1933.

== Tributes ==
The cephalopod name Loligo yokoyai M. Ishikawa, 1925 may possibly be in his honour. The thalassinidean name Upogebia yokoyai Makarov, 1938? is also in his honour.
