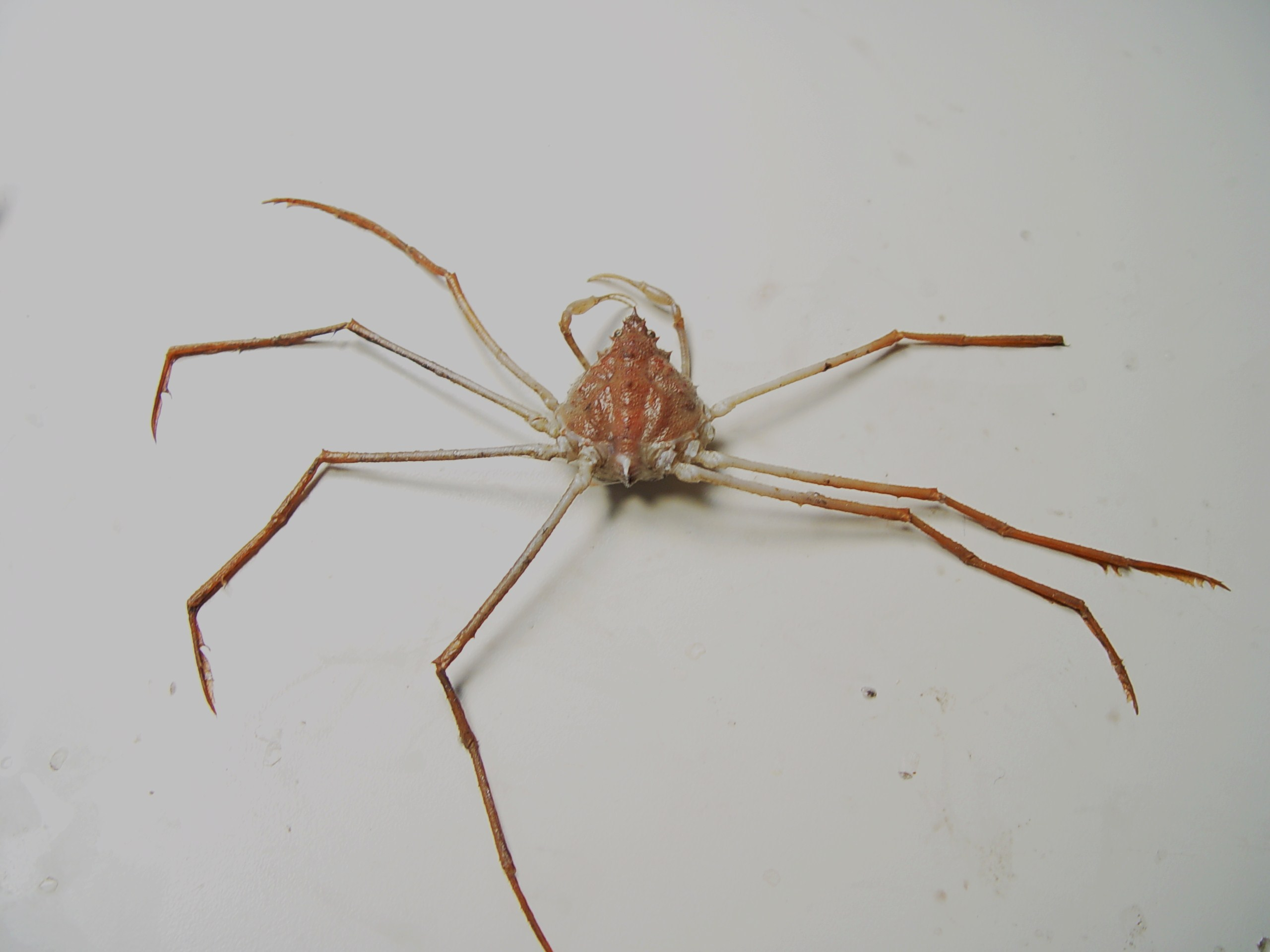
- Anasimus latus

Scientific classification
- Kingdom: Animalia
- Phylum: Arthropoda
- Clade: Pancrustacea
- Class: Malacostraca
- Order: Decapoda
- Suborder: Pleocyemata
- Infraorder: Brachyura
- Superfamily: Majoidea
- Family: Inachoididae; Dana, 1851

= Inachoididae =

Family of crabs

Inachoididae is a family of crabs originally erected by James Dwight Dana in 1852. It was not recognised as a valid family until the early 1980s. Its members closely resemble those of the family Inachidae, and the Inachoididae could be recognised as a subfamily of that family.

- Aepinus Rathbun, 1897
- Anasimus A. Milne-Edwards, 1880
- Arachnopsis Stimpson, 1871
- Batrachonotus Stimpson, 1871
- Collodes Stimpson, 1860
- Euprognatha Stimpson, 1871
- Inachoides H. Milne-Edwards & Lucas, 1842
- Leurocyclus Rathbun, 1897
- Paradasygyius Garth, 1958
- Pyromaia Stimpson, 1871
