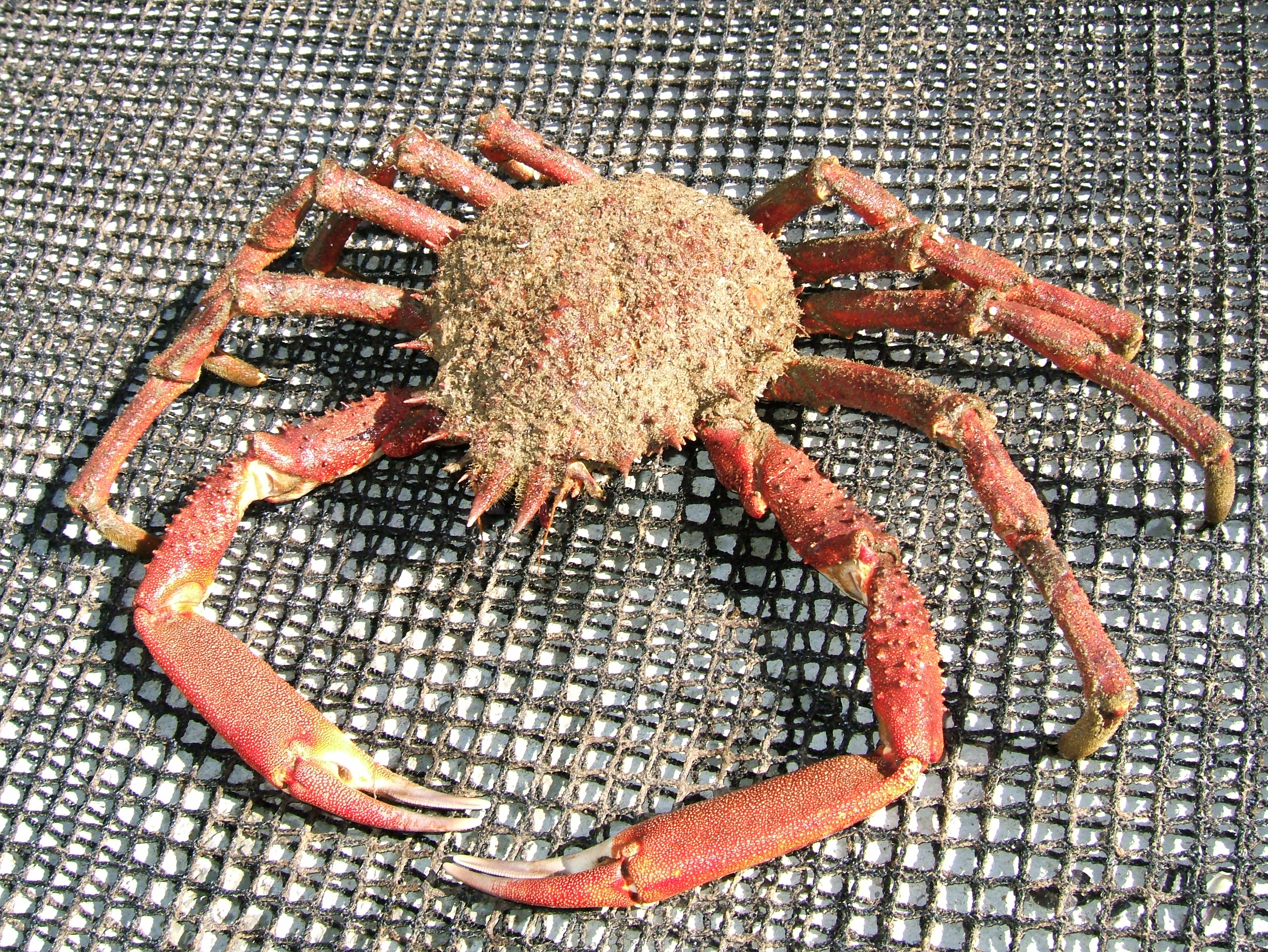
- Maja squinado (Majidae)

Scientific classification
- Kingdom: Animalia
- Phylum: Arthropoda
- Clade: Pancrustacea
- Class: Malacostraca
- Order: Decapoda
- Suborder: Pleocyemata
- Infraorder: Brachyura
- Subsection: Heterotremata
- Superfamily: Majoidea; Samouelle, 1819

= Majoidea =

Majoidea Temporal range: Cenomanian–Recent

Superfamily of crabs

Majoidea is a superfamily of crab which contains spider crabs, along with the decorator crabs.

== Taxonomy ==
In "A classification of living and fossil genera of decapod crustaceans" De Grave and colleagues divided Majoidea into six families. The classification has since been revised, with subfamilies Epialtinae and Mithracinae being elevated to families and Hymenosomatidae being moved to its own superfamily. The family composition according to the World Register of Marine Species is as follows:

- Epialtidae MacLeay, 1838
- Inachidae MacLeay, 1838
- Inachoididae Dana, 1851
- Macrocheiridae Dana, 1851
- Majidae Samouelle, 1819 – "true" spider crabs
- Mithracidae Balss, 1929
- Oregoniidae Garth, 1958
- †Priscinachidae Breton, 2009

Priscinachidae is represented by a single species, Priscinachus elongatus, from the Cenomanian of France.

Notable species within the superfamily include:

- Japanese spider crab (Macrocheira kaempferi), the largest living species of crab, found on the bottom of the Pacific Ocean.
- Libinia emarginata, the portly spider crab, a species of crab found in estuarine habitats on the east coast of North America.
- Hyas, a genus of spider crabs, including the great spider crab (Hyas araneus), found in the Atlantic and the North Sea.
- Maja squinado, sometimes called the "European spider crab"
- Australian spider crabs, found off Tasmania, are known to pile up on each other, the faster-moving crabs clambering over the smaller, slower ones.
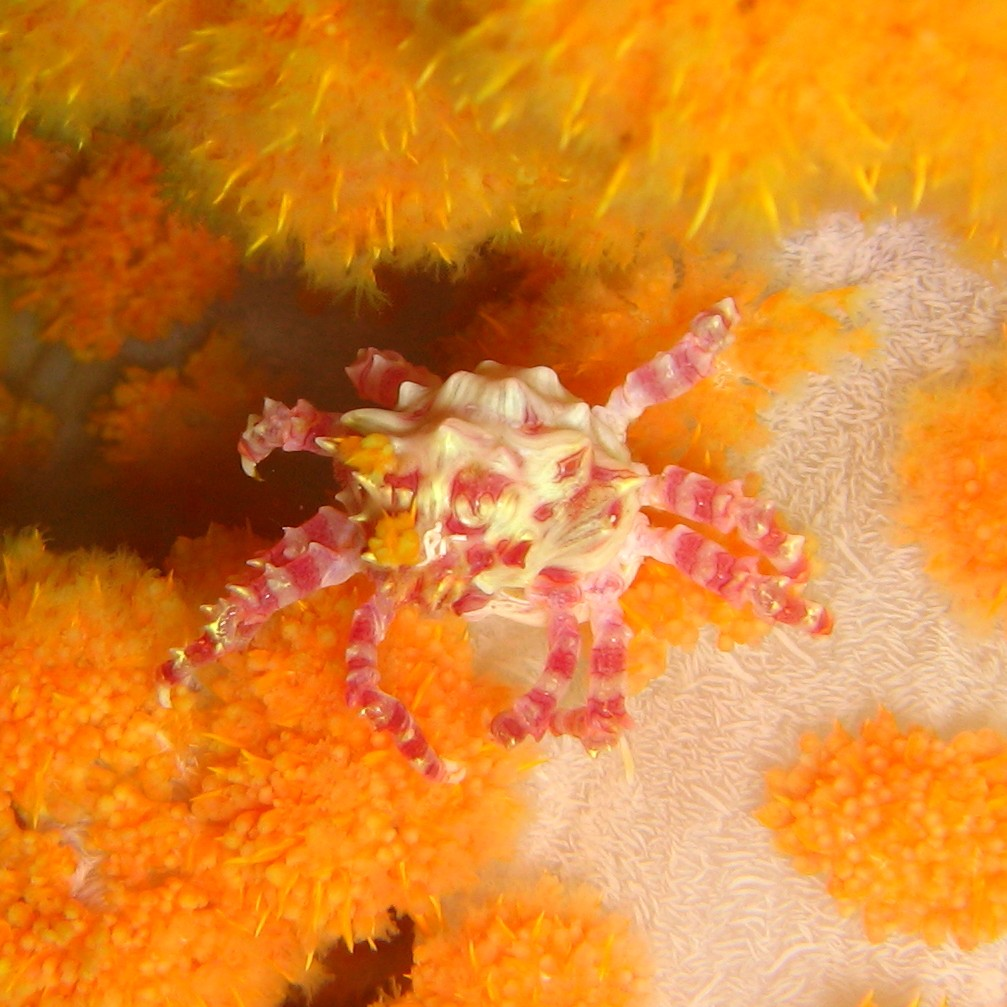
Hoplophrys oatesi, an Epialtidae

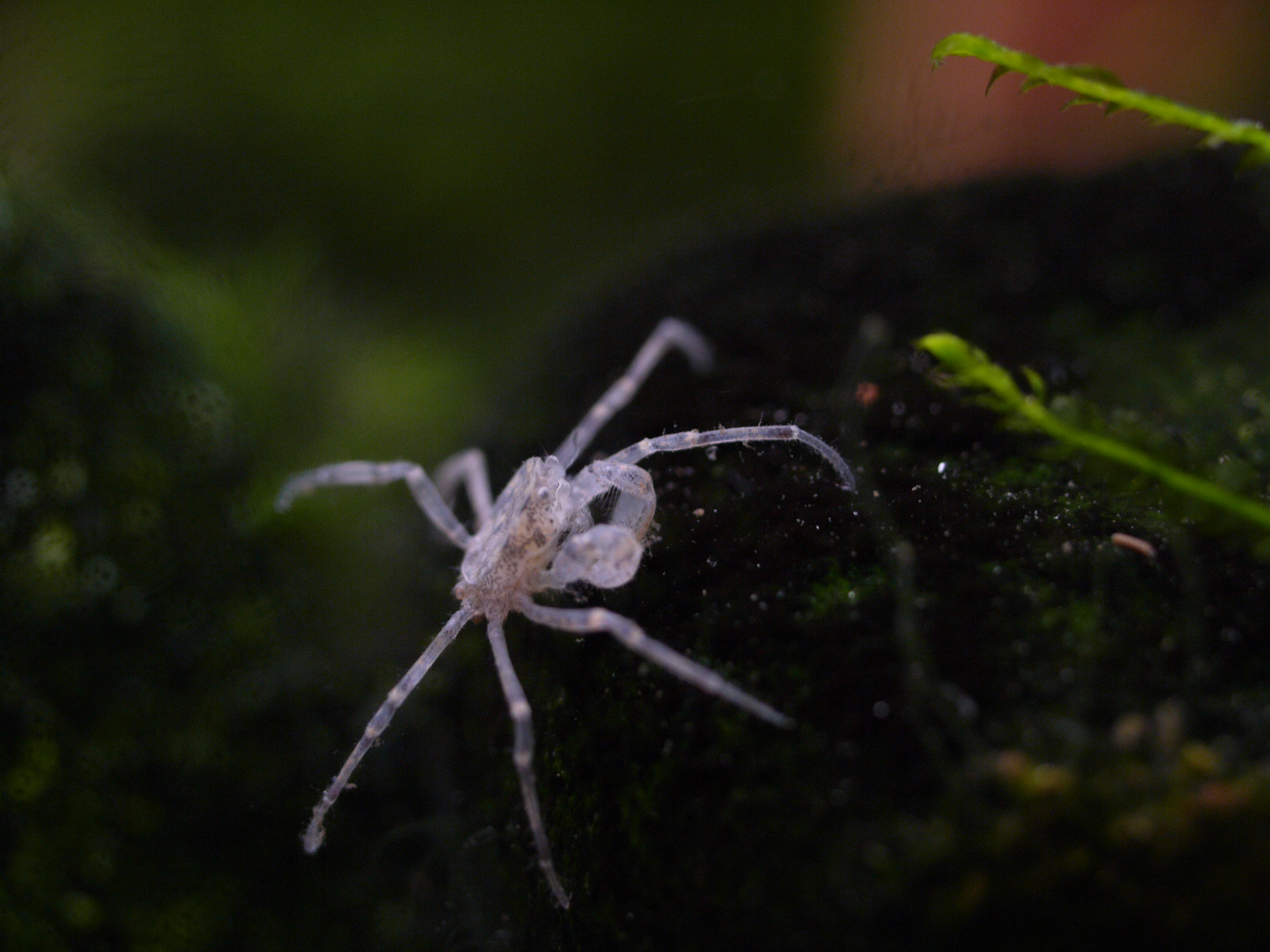
Limnopilos naiyanetri, a Hymenosomatidae

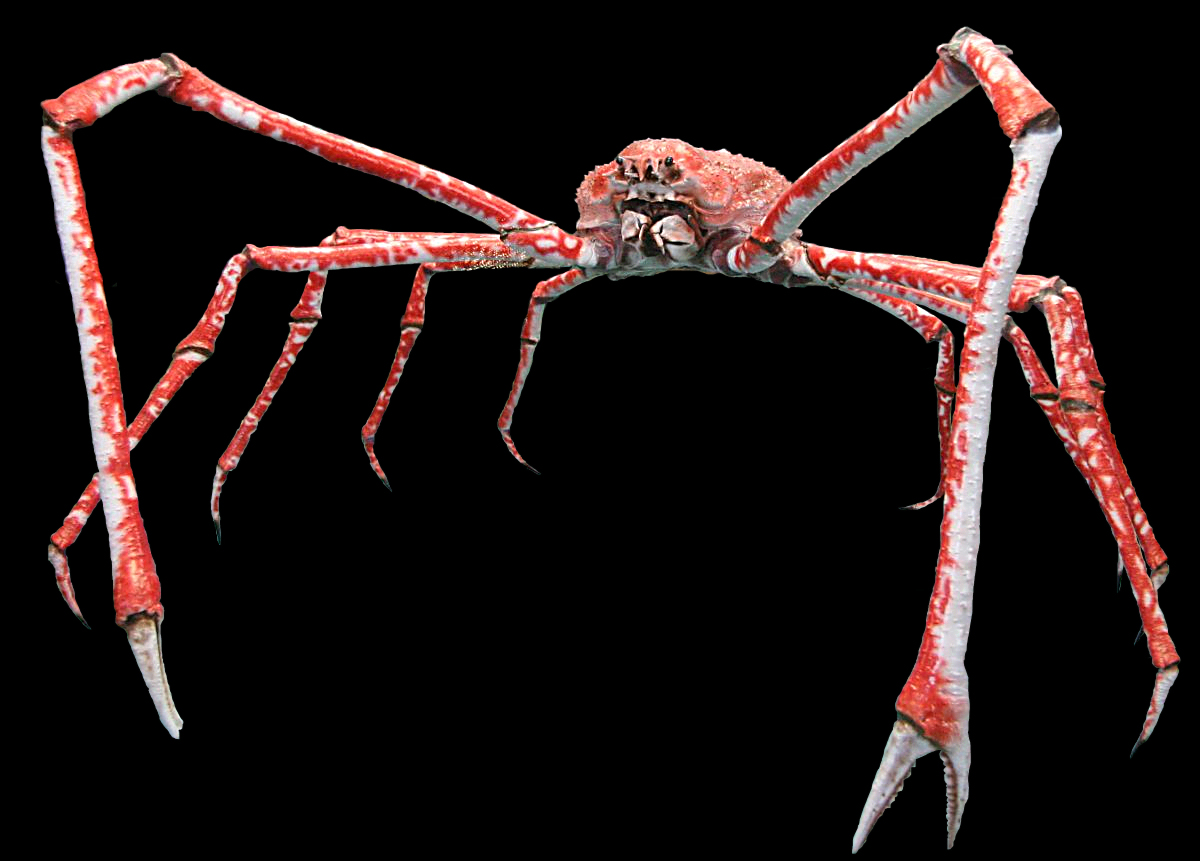
Macrocheira kaempferi, an Inachidae

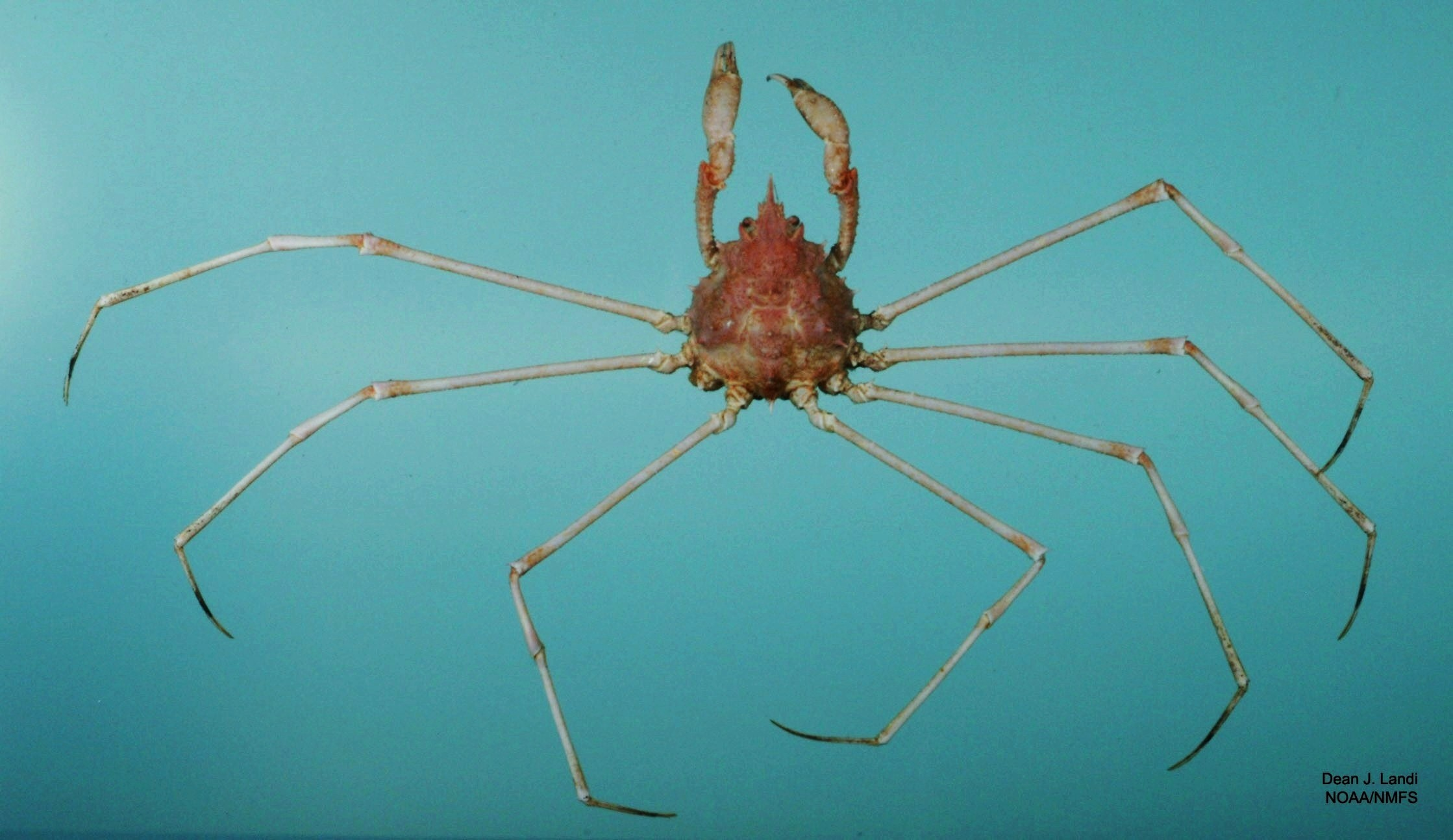
Pyromaia cuspidata, an Inachoididae

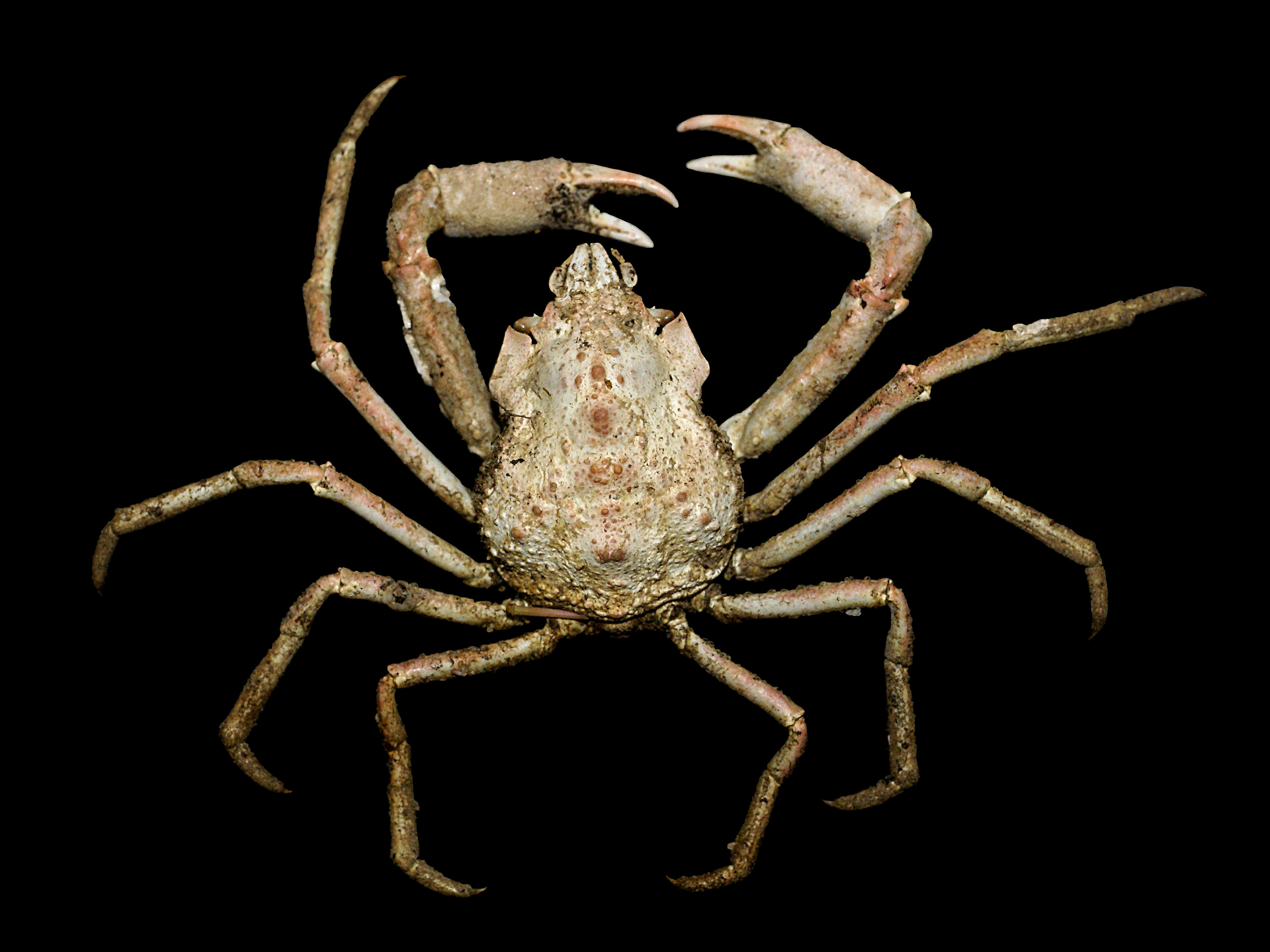
Hyas coarctatus, an Oregoniidae

== See also ==
- King crab
