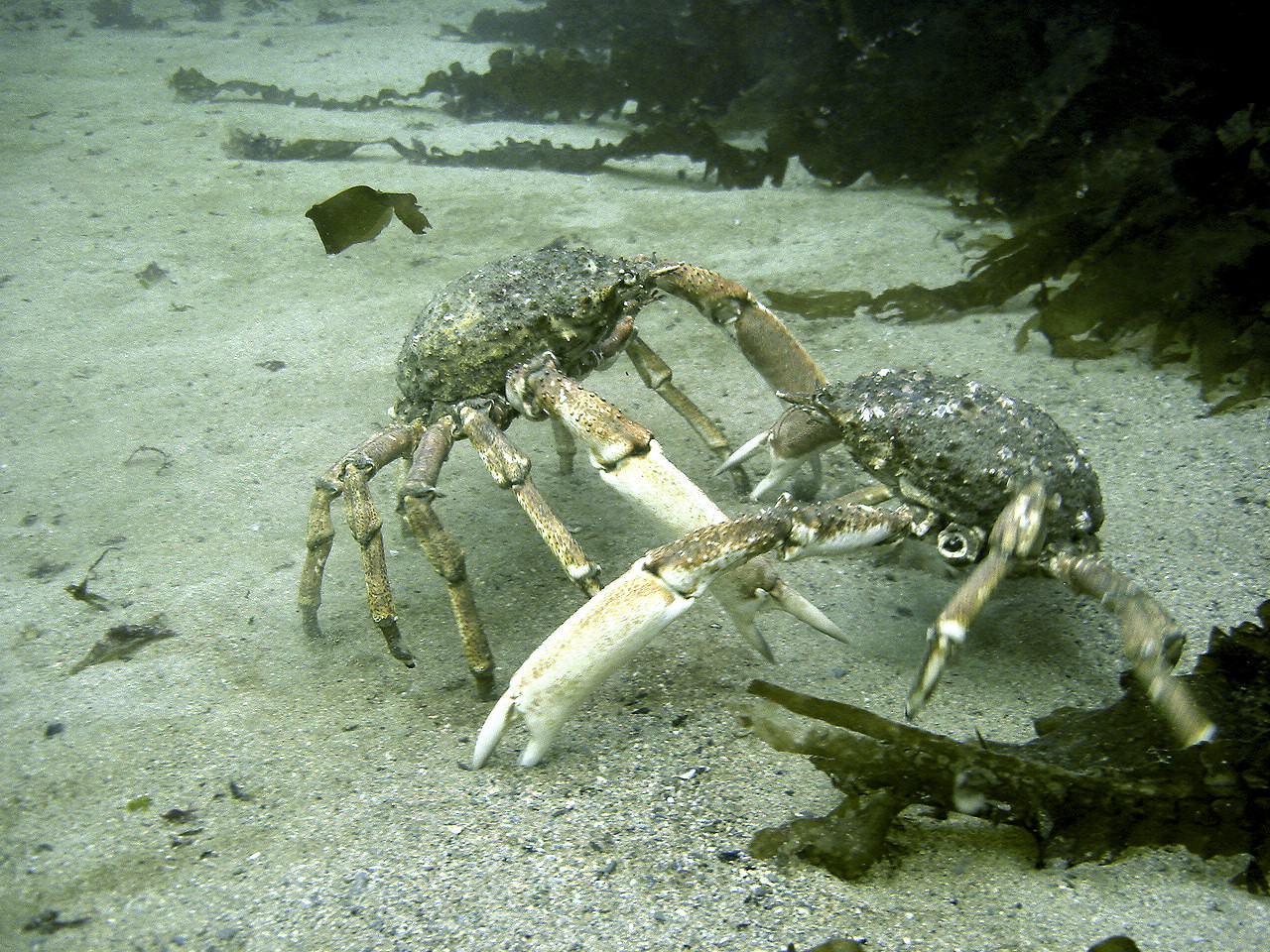
- Hyas araneus

Scientific classification
- Kingdom: Animalia
- Phylum: Arthropoda
- Clade: Pancrustacea
- Class: Malacostraca
- Order: Decapoda
- Suborder: Pleocyemata
- Infraorder: Brachyura
- Superfamily: Majoidea
- Family: Oregoniidae; Garth, 1958

= Oregoniidae =

Family of crabs

Oregoniidae is a family of crabs, with members ranging across the world.

== Taxonomy ==
Genera in this family:

- Parahyas Charbonnier, Garassino, Pasini & Chény, 2024†

Subfamily Oregoniinae Garth, 1958

- Chionoecetes Krøyer, 1838
- Hyas Leach, 1814
- Oregonia Dana, 1851

Subfamily Pleistacanthinae Števčić, 2005

- Bothromaia Williams & Moffitt, 1991
- Cyrtomaia Miers in Tizard, Moseley, Buchanan & Murray, 1885
- Ergasticus A. Milne-Edwards, 1882
- Grypachaeus Alcock, 1895
- Macroregonia Sakai, 1978
- Orbicantha Ng, Richer de Forges & Lee, 2023
- Parapleisticantha Yokoya, 1933
- Platymaia Miers in Tizard, Moseley, Buchanan & Murray, 1885
- Pleistacantha Miers, 1879
- Pleisticanthoides Yokoya, 1933
- Trichoplatus A. Milne-Edwards, 1876
- Vitjazmaia Zarenkov, 1994
