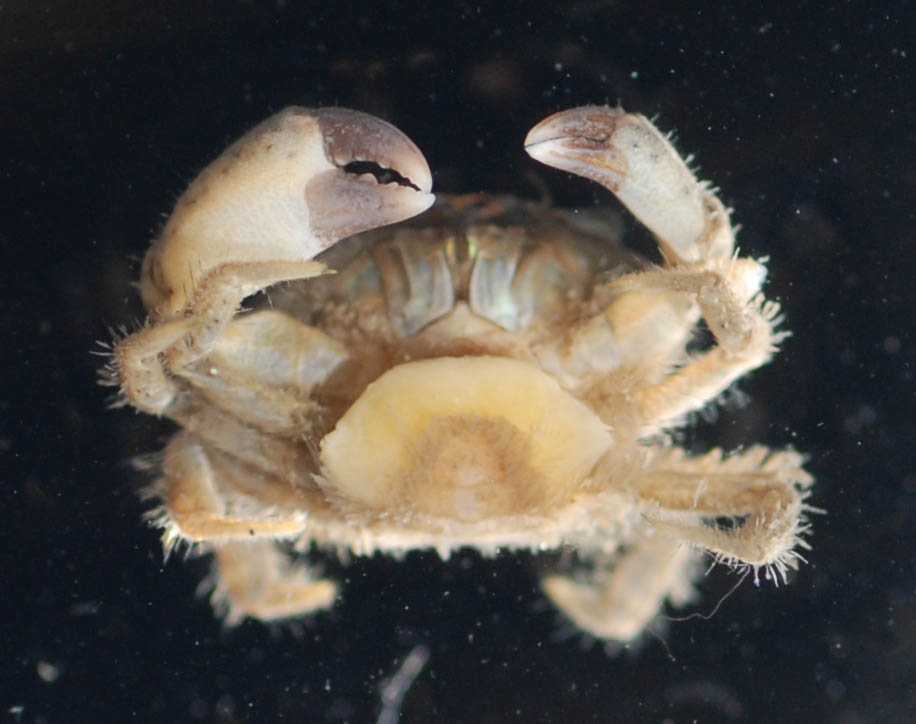
- Loxothylacus panopaei infecting Eurypanopeus depressus

Scientific classification
- Kingdom: Animalia
- Phylum: Arthropoda
- Class: Thecostraca
- Subclass: Cirripedia
- Family: Sacculinidae
- Genus: Loxothylacus
- Species: L. panopaei

Binomial name
- Loxothylacus panopaei (Gissler, 1884)

Synonyms
- Sacculina panopaei Gissler, 1884

= Loxothylacus panopaei =

Species of barnacle

Loxothylacus panopaei is a species of barnacle in the family Sacculinidae. It is native to the Gulf of Mexico and the Caribbean Sea. It is a parasitic castrator of small mud crabs in the family Panopeidae, mostly in the Gulf of Mexico, the Caribbean Sea and the eastern Atlantic Ocean.

== Taxonomy ==
L. panopaei was first described by the American zoologist Charles F. Gissler in 1884; it was parasitizing the mud crab Panopeus lacustris and was collected at Tampa, Florida. The barnacle infects a number of species of mud crab, and it seems likely that it is a species complex. Further taxonomic studies should clarify the position.

== Description ==
The parasitic adult L. panopaei consists of externa, a yellowish-orange mass of soft tissue, attached by a stalk to a host crab's abdomen; the stalk branches internally into tubes which surround the crab's gut.

== Distribution ==
L. panopaei is native to the Gulf of Mexico, the Caribbean Sea, the Atlantic coasts from Cape Canaveral to Florida and those of Venezuela. It has increased its range northward, being found for the first time in Chesapeake Bay in 1964. It arrived in the bay because many oysters there were infected by Haplosporidium nelsoni and stocks were replenished by importing eastern oysters (Crassostrea virginica) from the Gulf of Mexico. Accompanying these oysters were some crabs Eurypanopeus depressus which were parasitized by L. panopaei, the parasitic barnacle thus was inadvertently introduced to Chesapeake Bay where it found new species of crab to infect.

== Ecology ==
The adult barnacle bears no resemblance to an acorn barnacle, but the larval development is typical of a barnacle, with four nauplius larval stages and one cyprid larval stage. The female cyprid larva of L. panopaei has a spear-like stylet. When it settles on a suitable crab host, it pierces the carapace and develops underneath as an endoparasite for about a month. It then extrudes externa, or brood sac, beneath the crab's abdomen. This is fertilised by a free-swimming male cyprid larva. When the eggs in the brood sac have matured, the sac releases several thousand nauplius larvae at intervals.

Female crabs care for their eggs by carrying them beneath their abdomen, keeping them well aerated and protecting them. L. panopaei manipulates the behaviour of both sexes of the crab on which it settles, so that the host treats the barnacle's brood sac as if it contained the crab's own eggs. In the case of male crabs, the parasite causes the ventral abdominal plate to widen, which makes it more suitable for brooding, and alters the crab's behaviour so that it looks after the brood sac, despite this not being a normal behaviour for a male crab. Reproduction is completely suppressed in both male and female crabs which are effectively castrated. (Note: Parasitic castration is one of six major evolutionary strategies within parasitism.) The barnacle seems able to take control of the timing of the crab's moult, extruding its brood sac immediately after ecdysis, when the crab's shell is soft.

Suitable host crabs include the flatback mud crab (Eurypanopeus depressus), the Say's mud crab (Dyspanopeus sayi), the knotfinger mud crab (Panopeus lacustris), P. obessus, the furrowed mud crab (P. occidentalis), the oystershell mud crab (P. simpsoni), the Harris mud crab (Rhithropanopeus harrisii), Tetraplax quadridentata, and the inflated mud crab (Tetraxanthus rathbunae), all found in the western Atlantic Ocean, as well as the black-clawed crab (Lophopanopeus bellus) which is found in the eastern Pacific Ocean.
