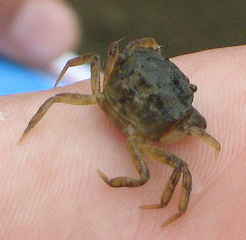
- Dyspanopeus sayi

Scientific classification
- Domain: Eukaryota
- Kingdom: Animalia
- Phylum: Arthropoda
- Class: Malacostraca
- Order: Decapoda
- Suborder: Pleocyemata
- Infraorder: Brachyura
- Family: Panopeidae
- Genus: Dyspanopeus; Martin & Abele, 1986

= Dyspanopeus =

Genus of crabs

Dyspanopeus is a genus of crabs in the family Panopeidae, comprising two species:

- Dyspanopeus sayi (Smith, 1869)
- Dyspanopeus texanus (Stimpson, 1859)

Both species were formerly included in the genus Panopeus, but were separated off into a segregate genus in 1986, based on the form of their pleopods, which differ markedly from those in Panopeus and other genera.
