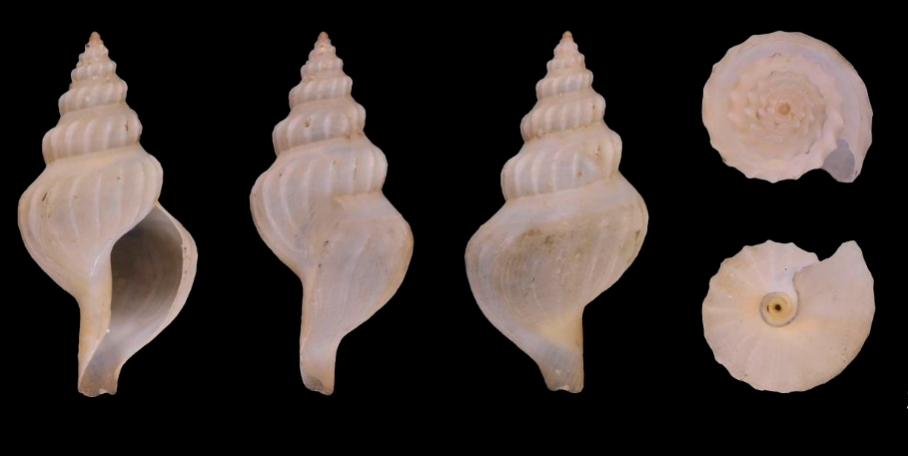
- Shell and protoconch of Pleurotomella packardii (holotype at the Smithsonian Institution)

Scientific classification
- Kingdom: Animalia
- Phylum: Mollusca
- Class: Gastropoda
- Subclass: Caenogastropoda
- Order: Neogastropoda
- Superfamily: Conoidea
- Family: Raphitomidae
- Genus: Pleurotomella
- Species: P. packardii

Binomial name
- Pleurotomella packardii A. E. Verrill, 1872

Synonyms
- Pleurotomella diastropha Dautzenberg, Ph. & H. Fischer, 1896; Pleurotomella formosa Jeffreys, J.G., 1883; Pleurotomella saffordi A. E. Verrill. & S. I. Smith, 1884; Mangilia formosa curta (f) Locard, E.A.A., 1897

= Pleurotomella packardii =

Species of sea snail

Pleurotomella packardii is a species of sea snail, a marine gastropod mollusk in the family Raphitomidae.

Type species of the genus.

Subspecies

- Pleurotomella packardii packardii Verrill, A.E., 1872
- Pleurotomella packardii benedicti Verrill, A.E. & S.I. Smith, 1884

== Description ==
The shell size varies between 15 mm and 22 mm

(Original description) The shell is thin, fragile, translucent, pale flesh-colored, moderately stout, with an acute, somewhat turreted spine. It contains 9 whorls. The 2½ whorls of the protoconch are nearly smooth, regular, convex and chestnut-colored. The subsequent whorls are shouldered, strongly convex in the middle, but with a smooth concave band below the suture, corresponding to the posterior notch in the outer lip. The whorls are crossed below the subsutural band by about 16 strong, prominent, rounded, somewhat oblique ribs, most prominent on the middle of the whorl, but not angulated. On the body whorl these ribs become very oblique below the middle and follow the curve of the edge of the lip, nearly fading out anteriorly. The surface between the ribs is marked by faint growth lines and by fine, unequal, slightly raised revolving lines, which pass over the ribs without interruption. They become more evident on the lower part of the body whorl and are very faint on the subsutural band, which is more decidedly marked by receding, strongly curved growth lines. The aperture is rather broad above, elongated blow, suboval. The outer lip is very thin, sharp, prominent above separated from the preceding whorl by a wide and very deep sinus, extending back for about one fifth of the circumference of the whorl. The anterior border of the lip is incurved near the end and obliquely truncate, forming a short, straight siphonal canal. The simple columella is nearly straight, its inner edge toward the end, sharp and obliquely recurved.

The absence of eyes and operculum, great size of the posterior sinus, and character of the apex, indicate that this shell represents a new genus, which I purpose to call Pleurotomella.

== Distribution ==
This species occurs in the bathyal northwest Atlantic Ocean and in the Gulf of Maine.
