= Oncopagurus africanus =

Scientific classification
- Domain: Eukaryota
- Kingdom: Animalia
- Phylum: Arthropoda
- Class: Malacostraca
- Order: Decapoda
- Suborder: Pleocyemata
- Infraorder: Anomura
- Family: Parapaguridae
- Genus: Oncopagurus
- Species: O. africanus

Binomial name
- Oncopagurus africanus (de Saint Laurent, 1972)

Synonyms
- Parapagurus africanus de Saint Laurent, 1972

Species of hermit crab

Oncopagurus africanus is a species of marine hermit crab within the family Parapaguridae. O. africanus inhabits gastropod shells often accompanied by an anthozoan polyp, at depths of 235 to 555 meters below sea level. Its distribution covers the southeastern Atlantic Ocean from the Democratic Republic of the Congo to Angola, and the southwest Indian Ocean off SE of Durban.

== Biology ==
The ocular peduncles in O. africanus are around half the length of its shield, and the antennal acicles exceed the distal margins of the corneas. The palm and carpus on the right cheliped is typically much shorter and smaller in females compared to males, with the length and width ratio is around 0.7 to 1.2 whereas males are around 1.2 and 2.

O. africanus exhibits similar morphology to O. gracillas, with both species having similar morphologies within sexual dimorphism within the right chilep.

Within the Oncopagurus genus, only 3 species are found in the Atlantic Ocean, being O. bicristatus, O. gracilis, and O. africanus. However, O. africanus is only found on the eastern margin of the Atlantic, whereas O. bicristatus and O. gracilis are distributed on both sides of the Atlantic.
