= Xiphopenaeus riveti =

Scientific classification
- Kingdom: Animalia
- Phylum: Arthropoda
- Clade: Pancrustacea
- Class: Malacostraca
- Order: Decapoda
- Suborder: Dendrobranchiata
- Family: Penaeidae
- Genus: Xiphopenaeus
- Species: X. riveti

Binomial name
- Xiphopenaeus riveti Bouvier, 1907

Species of prawn

Xiphopenaeus riveti, commonly known as the Pacific seabob, Pacific xiphopenaeus, or the titi, is a species of prawn in the family Penaeidae found in the Eastern Pacific, from Mexico to northern Peru. The prawn lives in brackish and marine waters along the coast or estuaries, on the bottom soft mud at depths of between 3.5 and 18 meters.

In Mexico, the prawn is of no commercial importance, and in Peru they may be caught but often discarded due to their small size, although the holotype, which was bought at a market in Peru, was 17 cm in length.

== Description ==
X. riveti grows up to 17 cm in length. Unlike Xiphopenaeus kroyeri, the dorsal keel is obtuse and very pronounced. The rostrum is small and curves upwards.
