= Panopeus (disambiguation) =

Panopeus was a Greek town of ancient Phocis.

Panopeus may also refer to:

- Panopeus (mythology), in Greek mythology, a son of Phocus and father of Epeus; namesake of the town
- Panopeus (father of Aegle), the father of Theseus's companion Aegle (mythology)
- Panopeus (crab), a genus of crabs in the family Panopeidae
- Panopea (bivalve), a genus of bivalves in the family Hiatellidae
