= Panopeus lacustris =

Scientific classification
- Kingdom: Animalia
- Phylum: Arthropoda
- Class: Malacostraca
- Order: Decapoda
- Suborder: Pleocyemata
- Infraorder: Brachyura
- Family: Panopeidae
- Genus: Panopeus
- Species: P. lacustris

Binomial name
- Panopeus lacustris Desbonne in Desbonne & Schramm, 1867

Synonyms
- Panopeus crassus A. Milne-Edwards, 1880; Panopeus herbstii granulosus A. Milne-Edwards, 1880

Species of crab

Panopeus lacustris, the knot-fingered mud crab, is a true crab belonging to the infraorder Brachyura. It can be distinguished from related species by its exceptionally broad and knobbly main chela (claw).

== Description ==
The knot-fingered mud crab is a small crab with unequal-sized chelae. The larger one is particularly broad and has teeth in the "molar area" and an immobile finger. Often this claw is worn and coalesced. The carapace and upper side of the limbs are a dull mottled reddish colour while the undersides of the body and limbs are whitish. Individuals living in caves are paler in colour and have antennules with white spots.

== Distribution and habitat ==
The knot-fingered mud crab is native to the subtropical western Atlantic Ocean, its range including southern Florida, Bermuda, the Caribbean Sea, the West Indies, and along the coast of South America as far south as Cabo Frio in Brazil. It was introduced into Hawaii in the 1950s and has also been present on the Pacific Coast of California since the 1980s or earlier.

== Ecology ==
This crab is sometimes parasitised by Loxothylacus panopaei, a species of parasitic barnacle that develops inside a host crab, manipulating the behaviour of the crab so that it cares for the barnacle's eggs, carrying them around and brooding them under its abdomen as if they were its own young. In fact, both male and female crabs are prevented from breeding and effectively castrated by the parasitic barnacle. Other mud crabs also act as hosts to the barnacle, but it was as a parasite of the knot-fingered mud crab that it was first described in 1884, the type locality being Tampa, Florida.
