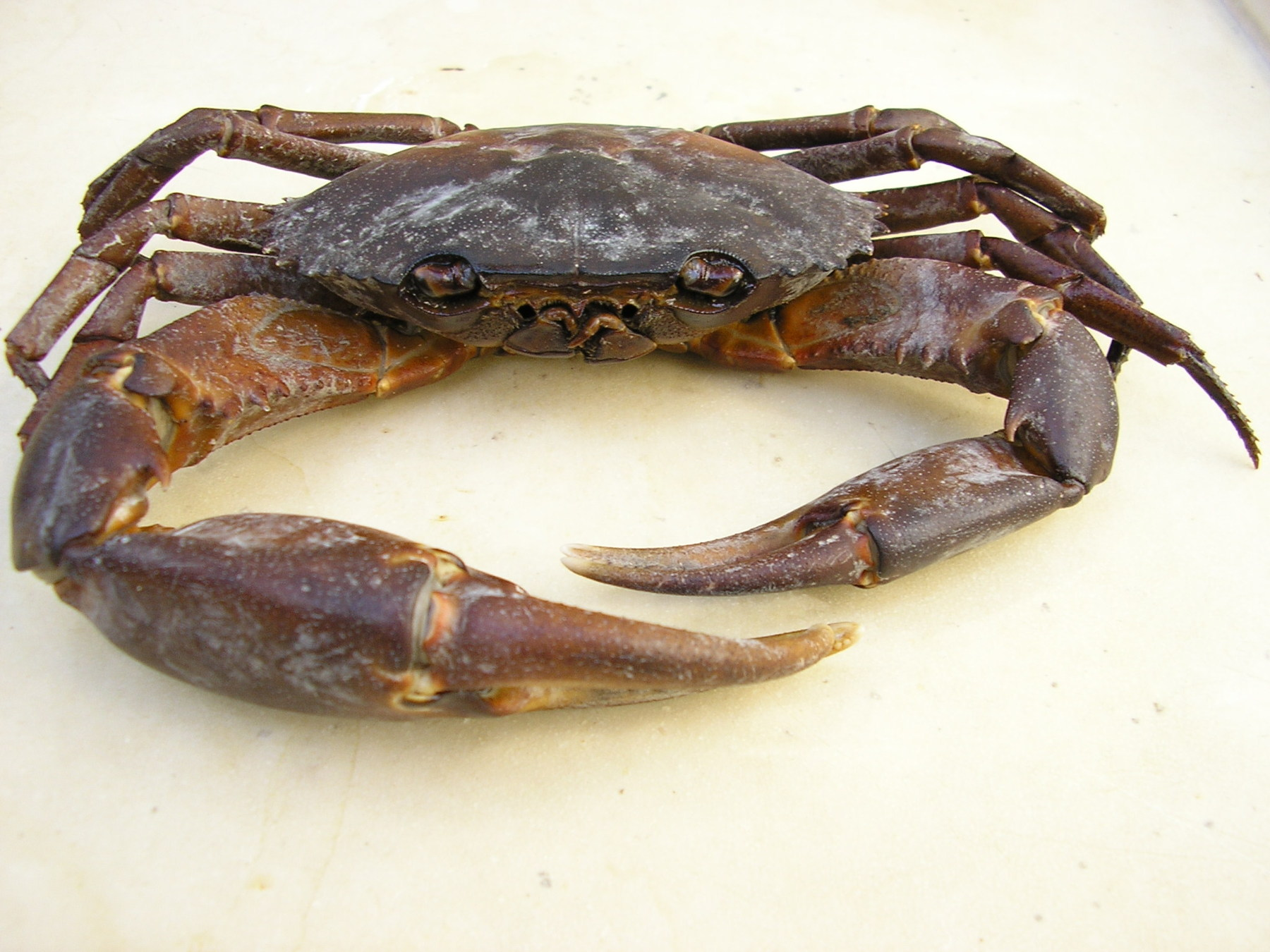

Scientific classification
- Kingdom: Animalia
- Phylum: Arthropoda
- Clade: Pancrustacea
- Class: Malacostraca
- Order: Decapoda
- Suborder: Pleocyemata
- Infraorder: Brachyura
- Family: Panopeidae
- Genus: Eurytium
- Species: E. tristani

Binomial name
- Eurytium tristani Rathbun, 1906

Synonyms
- Panopeus convexus minor Bott, 1955

= Eurytium tristani =

Species of crab

Eurytium tristani is a species of crab in the family Panopeidae.
