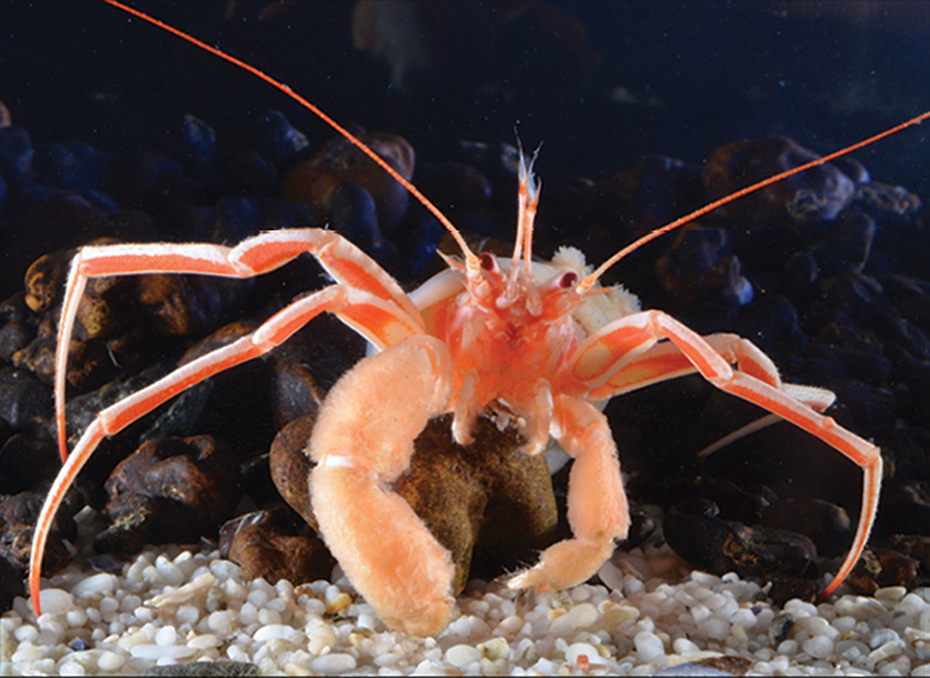

Scientific classification
- Kingdom: Animalia
- Phylum: Arthropoda
- Class: Malacostraca
- Order: Decapoda
- Suborder: Pleocyemata
- Infraorder: Anomura
- Family: Parapaguridae
- Genus: Parapagurus
- Species: P. bouvieri

Binomial name
- Parapagurus bouvieri Stebbing, 1910

= Parapagurus bouvieri =

Species of crustacean

Parapagurus bouvieri is a species of hermit crab in the genus Parapagurus. It is found in South Africa, Oceania, and the Pacific Ocean.
