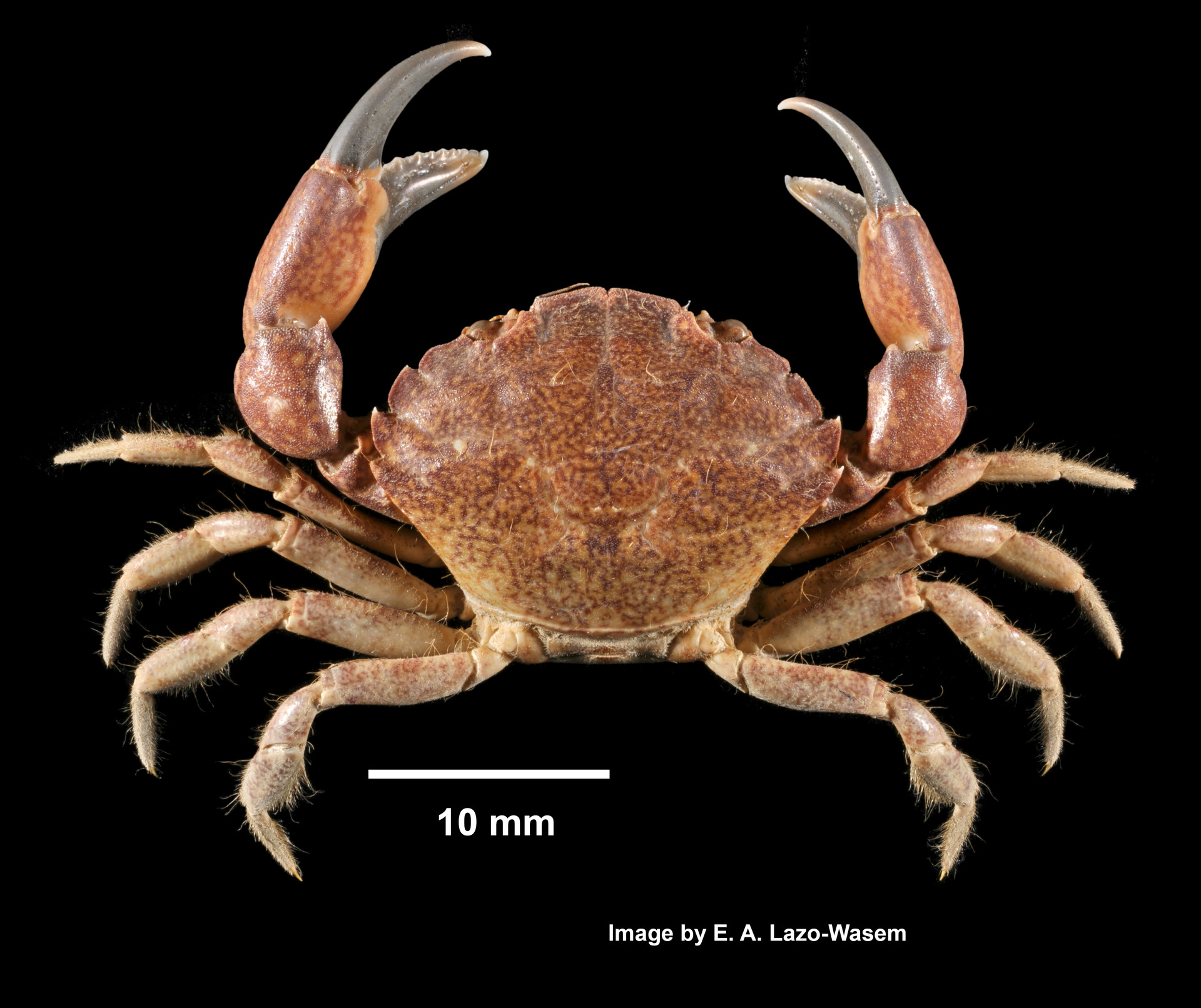

Scientific classification
- Kingdom: Animalia
- Phylum: Arthropoda
- Clade: Pancrustacea
- Class: Malacostraca
- Order: Decapoda
- Suborder: Pleocyemata
- Infraorder: Brachyura
- Family: Panopeidae
- Genus: Dyspanopeus
- Species: D. sayi

Binomial name
- Dyspanopeus sayi (S. I. Smith, 1869)

Synonyms
- Neopanope sayi (S. I. Smith, 1869); Panopeus sayi S. I. Smith, 1869

= Dyspanopeus sayi =

Species of crab

Dyspanopeus sayi is a species of mud crab that is native to the Atlantic coast of North America. It has also become established outside its native range, living in Swansea Docks since 1960, the Mediterranean Sea since the 1970s, the North Sea since 2007, and the Black Sea since 2009. It can reach a carapace width of 30 mm (1.2 in) and has black fingers on its unequal claws. It feeds on bivalves and barnacles, and it is in turn eaten by predators including the Atlantic blue crab, Callinectes sapidus. Eggs are produced from spring to autumn, the offspring reach sexual maturity the following summer, and individuals can live for up to two years. The closest relative of D. sayi is D. texanus, which lives in the Gulf of Mexico; the two species differ in subtle features of the genitalia and the last pair of walking legs.

== Description ==
Dyspanopeus sayi is a small crab, similar in appearance to Eurypanopeus depressus. It reaches a maximum carapace width of 30 millimetres (1.2 in), with sexually mature females having a carapace 6.1 millimetres (0.24 in) or more across. The carapace is roughly hexagonal, about 1.3–1.4 times as wide as long and strongly convex. It has a finely granular surface, and has a light covering of hair, especially towards the front and sides. The chelae (claws) are unequal: either the right or the left may be the larger. The carapace is olive-green to brown, but the fingers of the claws are black, with lighter tips.

== Distribution ==
The natural range of Dyspanopeus sayi extends from the Baie des Chaleurs in eastern Canada to the Florida Keys in the southeastern United States. It lives from the intertidal zone to depths of 46 metres (151 ft) and tolerates a wide range of temperatures and salinities.

D. sayi has also been recorded from a number of locations in Europe. The first sighting was in Swansea Docks in south Wales in 1960 – the species having been introduced accidentally through trans-Atlantic shipping. The first record from the Mediterranean Sea was made in 1992 when it was discovered in the Venetian Lagoon (north-eastern Italy), although it is thought to have been living there since the late 1970s. In 2007, D. sayi was recorded from the North Sea coast of the Netherlands. It was discovered in the Black Sea in 2009, living in Constanța harbour (Romania), and in the Ebro delta of the Balearic Sea (western Mediterranean Sea) in 2005.

== Ecology ==
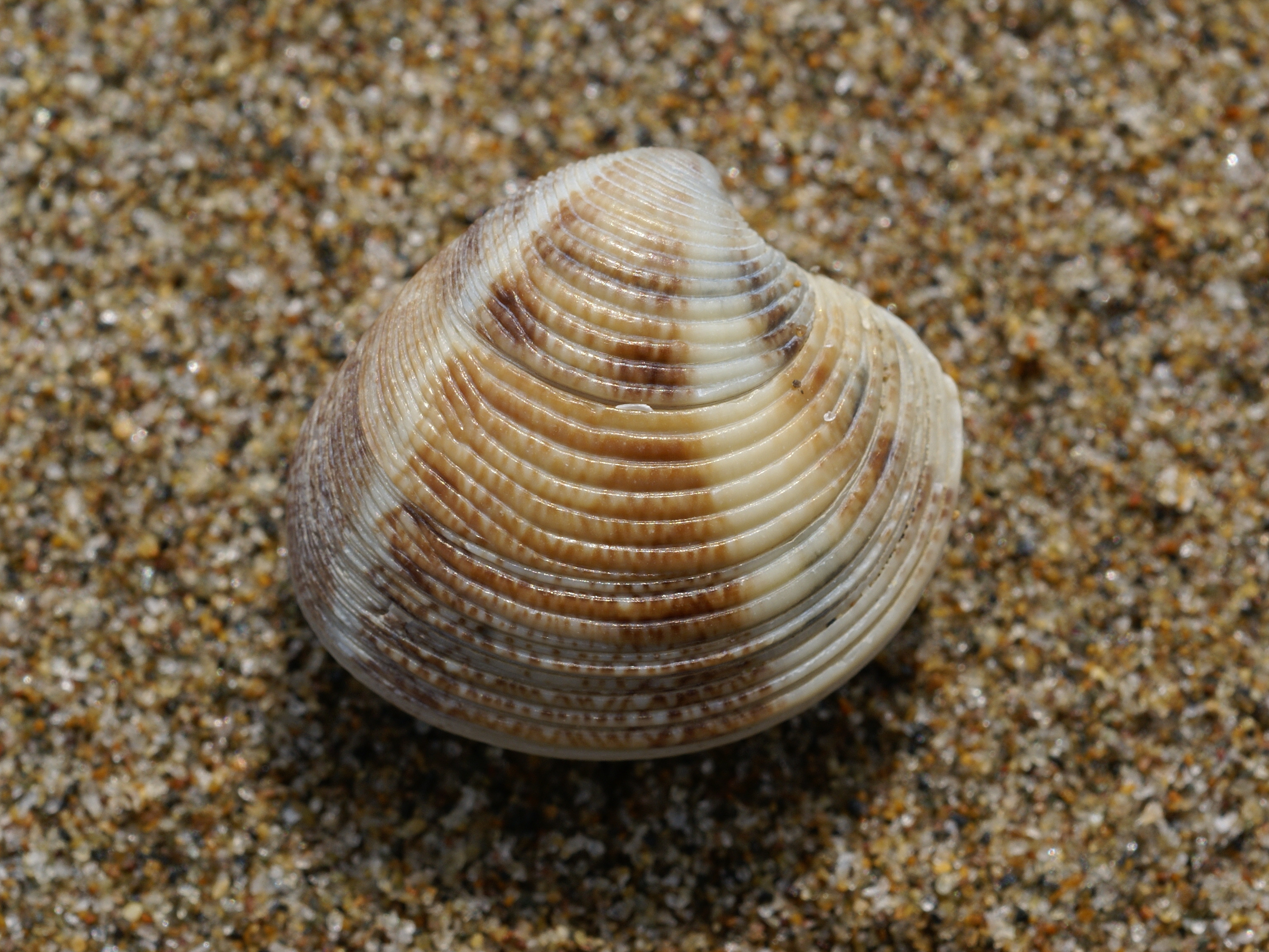
The bivalve Chamelea gallina is a food item for D. sayi in the Adriatic Sea.

Dyspanopeus sayi lives predominantly on muddy bottoms, where it is a predator of bivalve molluscs. In its native environment, it hides among colonies of polychaetes to avoid being preyed on by the Atlantic blue crab, Callinectes sapidus. It is an important predator of the quahog, Mercenaria mercenaria, in Narragansett Bay, and of the barnacle Balanus improvisus in Delaware Bay. In the Adriatic Sea, it has been observed to feed on the striped venus clam, Chamelea gallina, and the introduced Asian date mussel, Arcuatula senhousia.

== Life cycle ==
The life cycle of D. sayi begins with copulation, which normally takes place shortly after the female has moulted, while her exoskeleton is still soft. Spawning occurs within hours or days of copulation, and the eggs are brooded on the female's pleopods (swimmerets) until they are ready to hatch. Females have been found carrying eggs from April to October; in a study of crabs caught at Gloucester Point, Virginia in 1978, females were observed to carry between 686 and 14,735 eggs. The number of eggs increases with carapace width according to a power law; extrapolation of the power law suggests that the largest D. sayi females are capable of carrying over 32,000 eggs each.

At 29 °C (84 °F), the eggs can take only 9 or 10 days to develop, and this increases to 16 days at temperatures of 20 °C (68 °F). The young crabs hatch as zoea and pass through three further zoeal stages and one megalopa before becoming juveniles. Juveniles are thought to reach maturity in the summer after they hatch. The total lifespan of an individual can be up to 2 years.

== Taxonomy ==
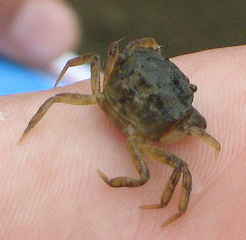
A live D. sayi caught in the Kouchibouguac River in New Brunswick

The species had been noticed by the American zoologist Thomas Say, and formed part of the species he called "Cancer panope" – a junior homonym of "Cancer panope" Herbst, 1801, which is itself a junior synonym of Sphaerozius scaber (Fabricius, 1798). In 1869, Sidney Irving Smith described seven new species in the genus Panopeus, including "P. sayi", in addition to the twelve species already placed in the genus at that time.

Smith noted the similarity of the species to "Panopeus texanus", which had been described ten years earlier by William Stimpson, and Smith considered that the two might be the same species. In 1880, John Sterling Kingsley and Alphonse Milne-Edwards independently synonymised "P. sayi" with "P. texana", which remained until Mary J. Rathbun moved both taxa to the genus Neopanope and re-established Smith's taxon as a subspecies of "N. texana". She argued that the two taxa should be considered subspecies, as hybrids between them occurred, although the specimens she saw are now thought to be D. sayi.

In 1972, Lawrence G. Abele re-examined "N. texanus texanus", "N. texanus sayi" and N. packardi, and concluded that they were all good species, and so re-elevated "N. sayi" to the rank of species. In 1986, Joel W. Martin and Abele placed N. texanus and N. sayi in a separate genus, Dyspanopeus, reaffirming their close relationship. However, D. texanus only occurs in the Gulf of Mexico, and can be distinguished from D. sayi by the form of the fifth pereiopod (last walking leg) and that of the male gonopod.
