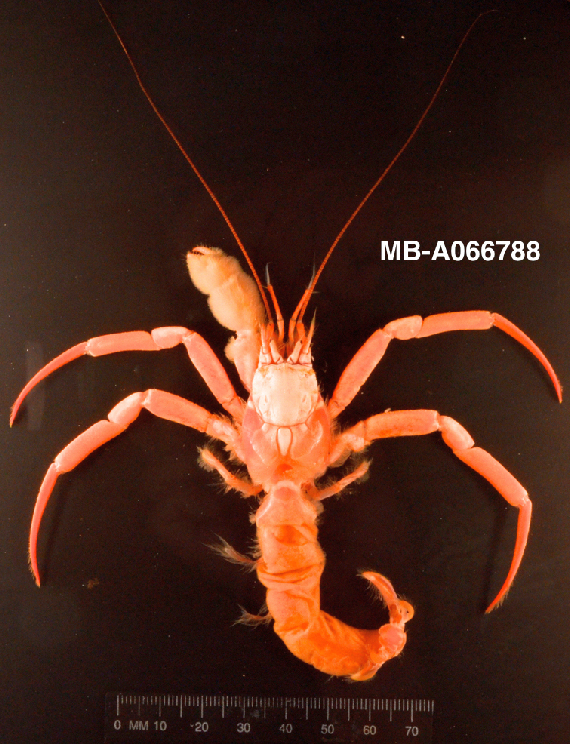

Scientific classification
- Kingdom: Animalia
- Phylum: Arthropoda
- Clade: Pancrustacea
- Class: Malacostraca
- Order: Decapoda
- Suborder: Pleocyemata
- Infraorder: Anomura
- Family: Parapaguridae
- Genus: Parapagurus
- Species: P. andreui

Binomial name
- Parapagurus andreui Macpherson, 1984

= Parapagurus andreui =

Type of Hermit Crab

Parapagurus andreui is a type of species of hermit crab from the family Parapaguridae. Its genus is under the Parapagurus. It is found at the main part of the Gulf of Mexico along with some parts of Eastern United States and Southern Africa. It was first described in 1984 by Enrique Macpherson. There are no sub-species.
