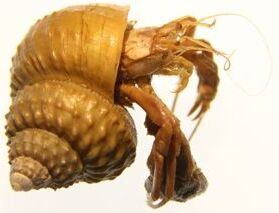

Scientific classification
- Kingdom: Animalia
- Phylum: Arthropoda
- Clade: Pancrustacea
- Class: Malacostraca
- Order: Decapoda
- Suborder: Pleocyemata
- Infraorder: Anomura
- Family: Parapaguridae
- Genus: Parapagurus
- Species: P. benedicti

Binomial name
- Parapagurus benedicti de Saint Laurent, 1972

= Parapagurus benedicti =

Species of hermit crab

Parapagurus benedicti is a species of the hermit crab from the Parapaguridae family.

They can be found mainly near Vancouver Island, while smaller populations are also located in the Gulf of Alaska and Baja California. It is found at least 757 metres (2,484 ft) underwater.

The species was first described in 1972. There are no sub-species.
