= Paragiopagurus wallisi =

Scientific classification
- Domain: Eukaryota
- Kingdom: Animalia
- Phylum: Arthropoda
- Class: Malacostraca
- Order: Decapoda
- Suborder: Pleocyemata
- Infraorder: Anomura
- Family: Parapaguridae
- Genus: Paragiopagurus
- Species: P. wallisi

Binomial name
- Paragiopagurus wallisi (Lemaitre, 1994)

Species of crustacean

Paragiopagurus wallisi is a species of hermit crab in the family Parapaguridae. It lives in the Eastern Pacific, in areas like the French Polynesia, Sala y Gómez, and the Nazca Ridges in benthic environments from 200 to 300 meters deep.
