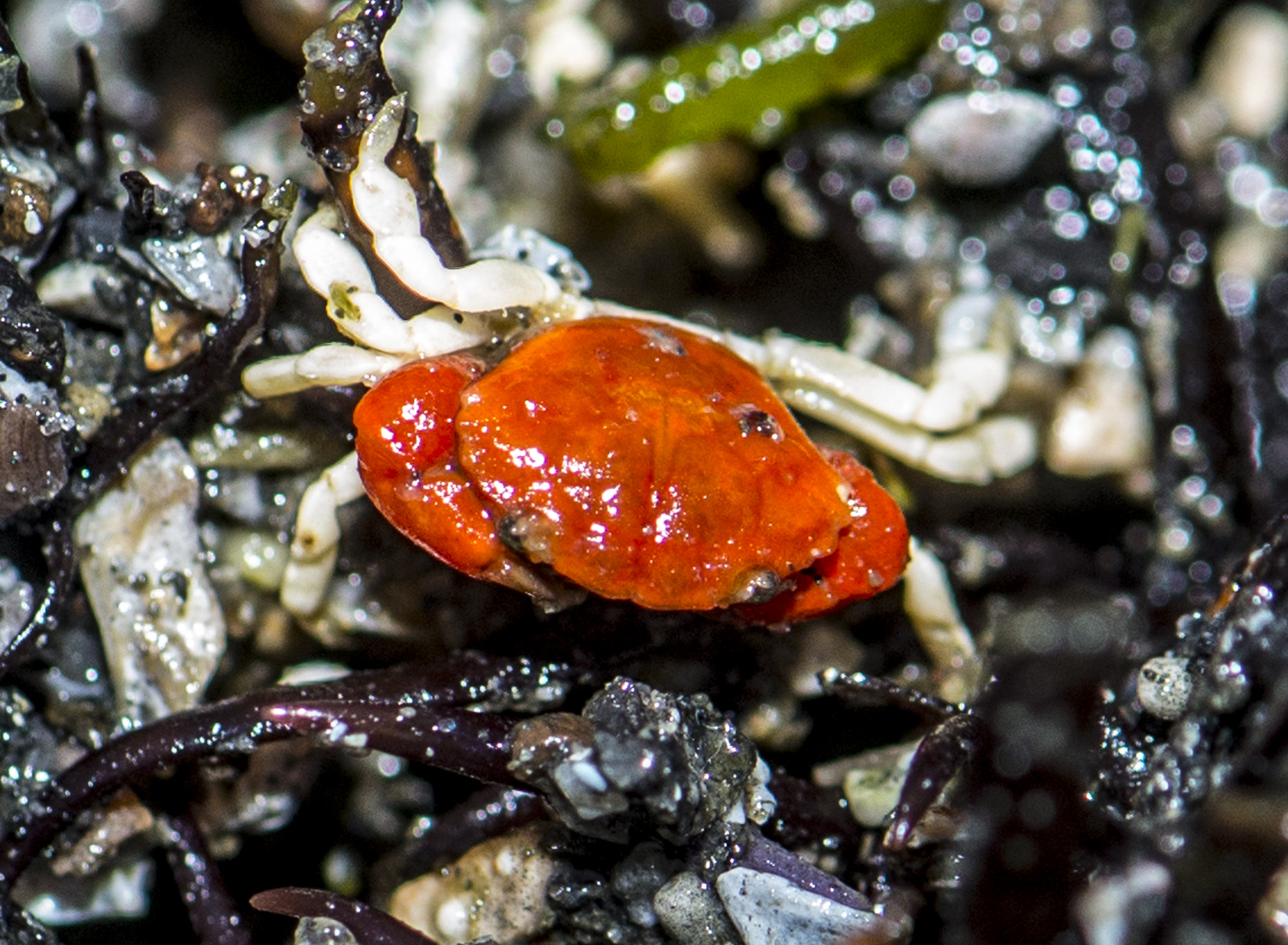

Scientific classification
- Kingdom: Animalia
- Phylum: Arthropoda
- Class: Malacostraca
- Order: Decapoda
- Suborder: Pleocyemata
- Infraorder: Brachyura
- Family: Panopeidae
- Genus: Lophopanopeus
- Species: L. bellus

Binomial name
- Lophopanopeus bellus (Stimpson, 1860)

Synonyms
- Xantho bellus Stimpson, 1860; Xantho hemphilliana Lockington, 1877; Xanthodes hemphillii Lockington, 1877

= Lophopanopeus bellus =

Species of crab

Lophopanopeus bellus, the black-clawed crab, is a species of crab in the family Panopeidae. It is native to the Pacific coasts of North America, its range extending from Alaska to California.

== Description ==
Lophopanopeus bellus is a small crab with a carapace width of up to 5 cm (2 in). The carapace is more rounded than some related species and the upper side is covered with low, rounded projections known as tubercles. There are more prominent tubercles on the fifth, sixth and seventh segments of the chelipeds; the legs are covered with setae (bristles) and have black claws. The color of this crab is quite variable; its color range includes off-white, various combinations of bluish-black and red, dull dark red and nearly black, the underside is usually whitish. This crab could be confused with Glebocarcinus oregonensis which is a similar size, but that species has spiny ridges on the chelae instead of tubercles.

== Distribution ==
Lophopanopeus bellus is found along the Pacific coast of North America. Two subspecies are recognised: L. b. bellus ranges from Resurrection Bay, Alaska southward to Cayucos, California, while L. b. diegensis ranges from Monterey Bay southwards to San Diego.

== Ecology ==
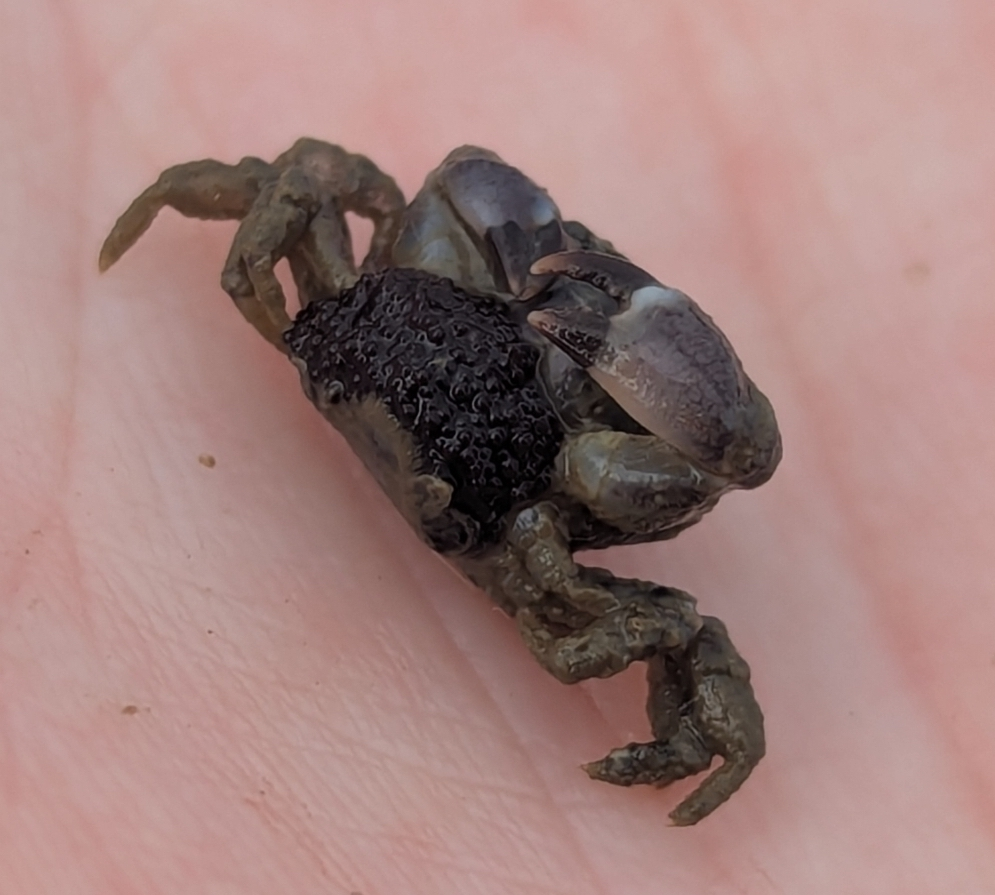
Female Lophopanopeus bellus with eggs on the underside of her abdomen, Moss Beach, California, 2025

Breeding begins in April in the Puget Sound area; the female carries the eggs around on the underside of her abdomen for their protection and they hatch from May onwards. Many females carry a second brood which hatches in August. After hatching, the zoea larvae become free-living and form part of the plankton. Many individuals of this species are parasitized by the barnacle Loxothylacus panopaei.
