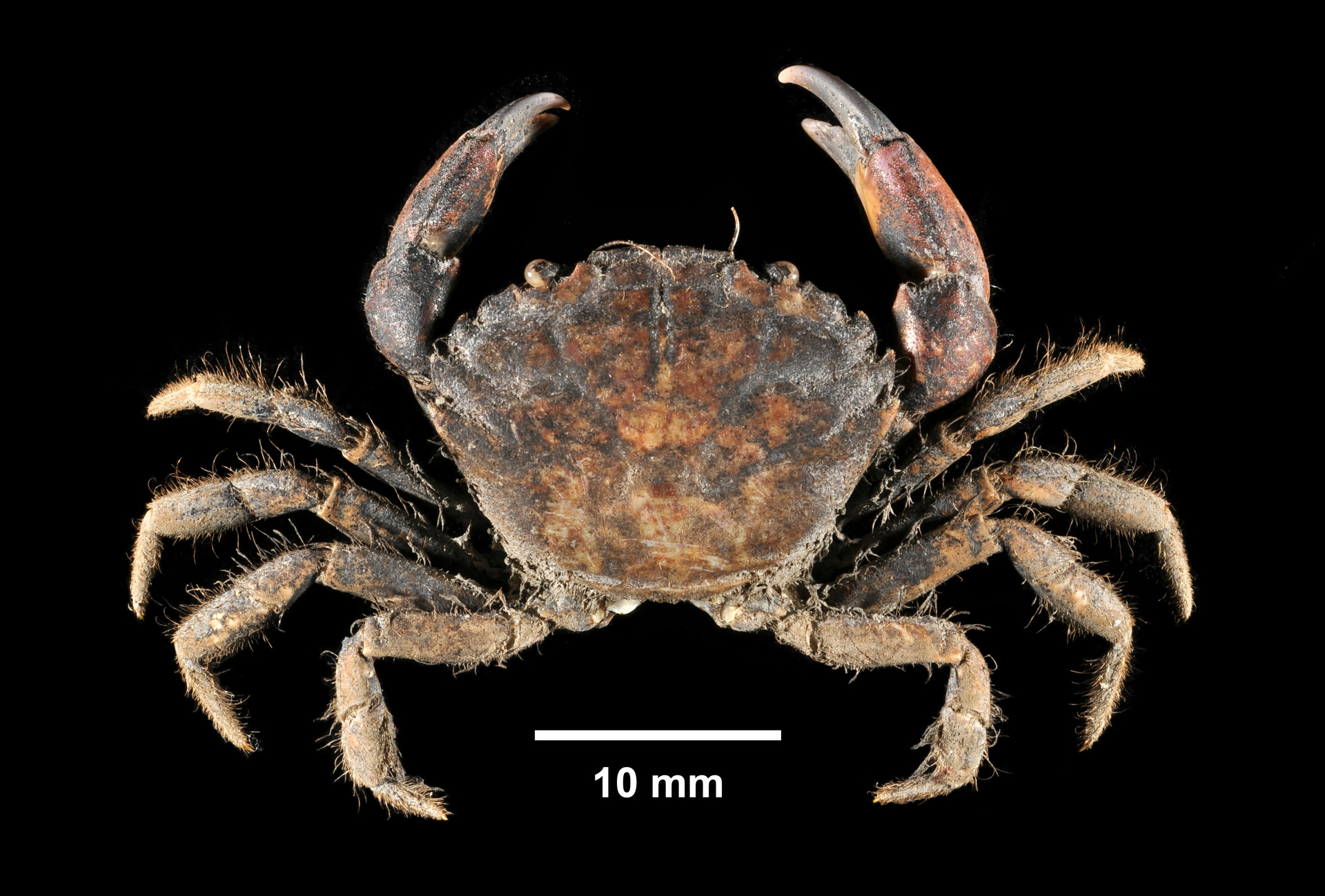

Scientific classification
- Kingdom: Animalia
- Phylum: Arthropoda
- Clade: Pancrustacea
- Class: Malacostraca
- Order: Decapoda
- Suborder: Pleocyemata
- Infraorder: Brachyura
- Family: Panopeidae
- Genus: Panopeus
- Species: P. herbstii

Binomial name
- Panopeus herbstii H. Milne-Edwards, 1834

= Panopeus herbstii =

Species of crab

Panopeus herbstii, also known as the black-fingered mud crab, black-clawed mud crab, Atlantic mud crab or sometimes common mud crab, is a species of true crab, belonging to the infraorder Brachyura, and is the largest of the mud crabs. Panopeus herbstii are found along the western edges of the Atlantic Ocean in areas of North America, Central, and South America. Typically Panopeus herbstii feed on molluscs such as clams. Their conservation status is not marked but they are at risk due to habitat destruction and climate change along with ocean acidification.

== Description ==
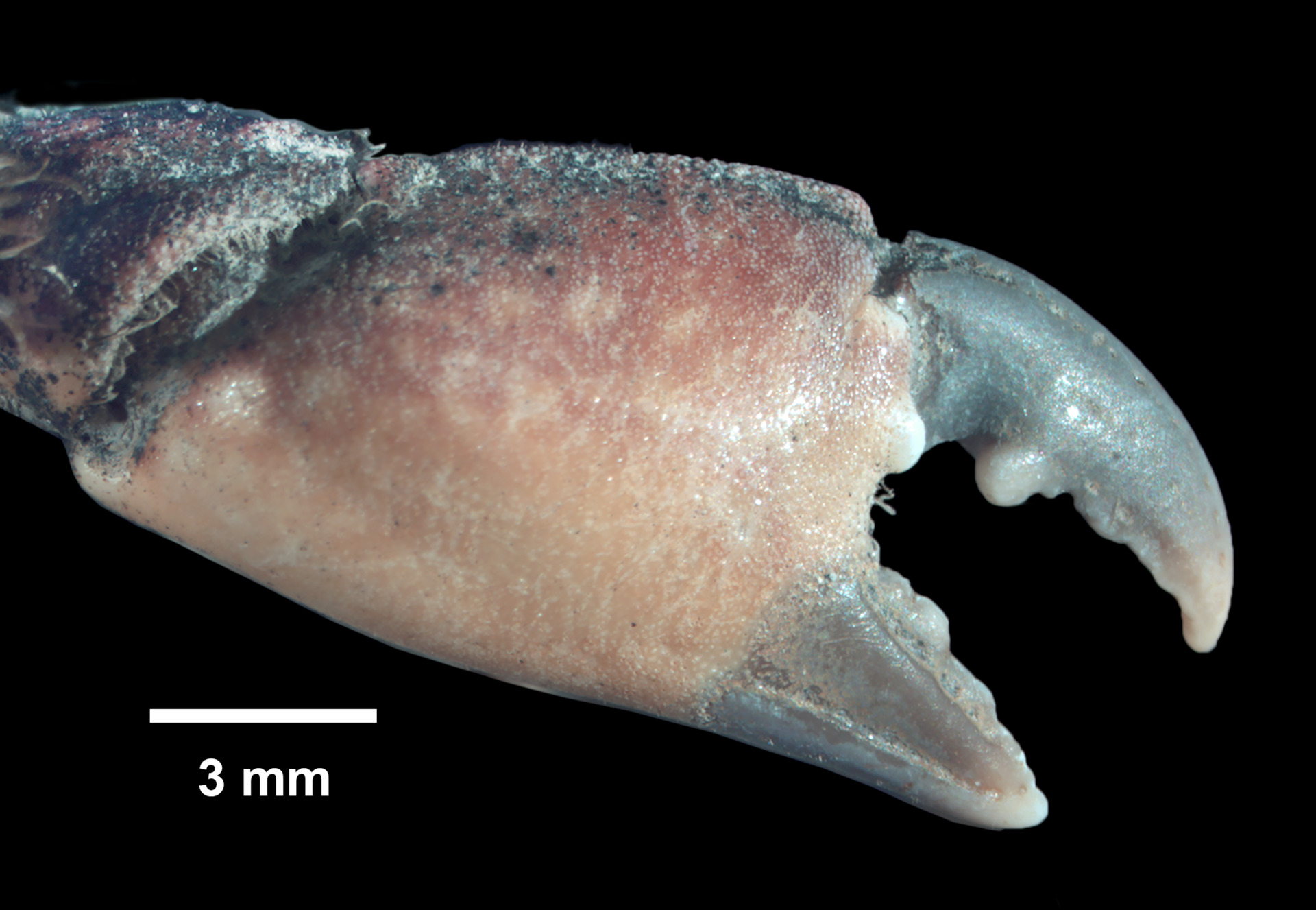

Panopeus herbstii is small, growing to about a width 6.4 cm, with black-tipped claws of unequal size. P. herbstii has a strong exoskeleton, with very thick and strong claws. The shell is mostly a dull gray and dark brown color with the belly of the crab being a lighter white.

== Habitat ==
Panopeus herbstii is found along the Atlantic coast of North America, from Boston, Massachusetts to Santa Catarina, Brazil and on Bermuda. It is the most common xanthid crab on the east coast of the United States. It is found on muddy bottoms and oyster beds, where it takes refuge under stones and shells or among sponges and weeds, but it is rarely seen in the open. Its habitat often being in oyster beds allows for easier access to prey and feeding.

== Diet ==
It feeds mainly on young clams, oysters, barnacles, and periwinkles; it cracks open their shells with its strong claws. They are also an interspecific cannibalism species as they eat other crabs. Mud crabs are especially fond of hermit crabs, which are grasped by the legs and pulled out of their protective shells. Like most mud crabs, it is a scavenger. Young P. herbstii are an important food source to other marine animals.

== Life Cycle ==
Like other crab species, Panopeus herbstii relies on seasonal temperature shifts to cue when to reproduce. When ready and 18 and 24 months of age female Panopeus herbstii mate. She carries her fertilized eggs around on her under abdomen until they hatch and she releases planktonic larva into the water. It is currently uncertain how long Panopeus herbstii lives for.

== Conservation status ==
Panopeus herbstii are not currently listed on any lists within the US as endangered and population levels are stated as stable. However they are at risk from climate change due to destruction to their habitats. Along with risk of decrease in populations because of over harvesting of oysters which they relay on for food. Ocean acidification and water quality is a big climate change factor that is putting Panopeus herbstii at risk due to hurting oysters populations which are their main food source.
