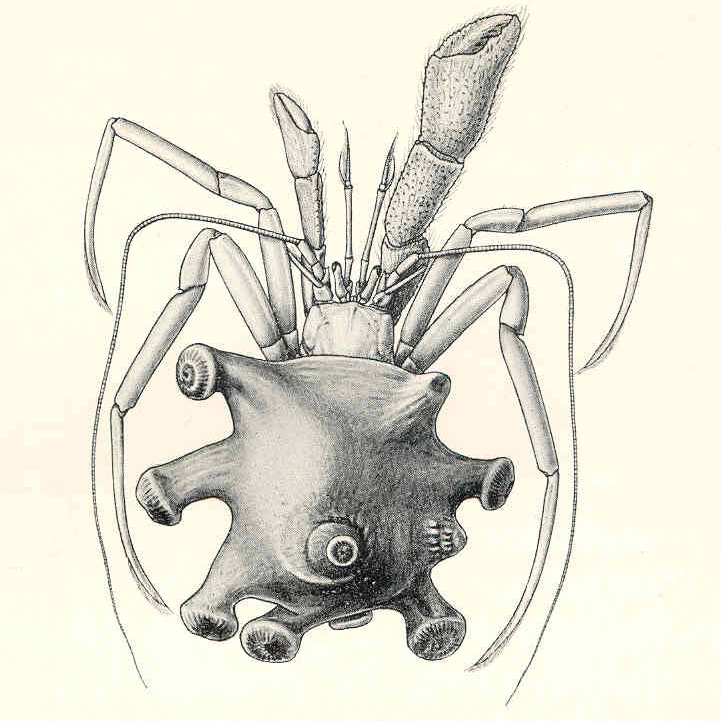
- Illustration of Parapagurus pilosimanus

Scientific classification
- Kingdom: Animalia
- Phylum: Arthropoda
- Class: Malacostraca
- Order: Decapoda
- Suborder: Pleocyemata
- Infraorder: Anomura
- Family: Parapaguridae
- Genus: Parapagurus; Smith, 1879

Type species
- Parapagurus pilosimanus Smith, 1879

= Parapagurus =

Genus of crustaceans

Parapagurus is a genus of deep-sea hermit crabs in the family Parapaguridae, that contains 17 species.

== Species ==
- Parapagurus abyssorum (Filhol, 1885)
- Parapagurus alaminos Lemaitre, 1986
- Parapagurus andreui Macpherson, 1984
- Parapagurus benedicti de Saint Laurent, 1972
- Parapagurus bouvieri Stebbing, 1910
- Parapagurus foraminosus Lemaitre, 1999
- Parapagurus furici Lemaitre, 1999
- Parapagurus holthuisi Lemaitre, 1989
- Parapagurus janetae Lemaitre, 1999
- Parapagurus latimanus Henderson, 1888
- Parapagurus microps de Saint Laurent, 1972
- Parapagurus nudus (A. Milne-Edwards, 1891)
- Parapagurus pilosimanus Smith, 1879
- Parapagurus richeri Lemaitre, 1999
- Parapagurus saintlaurentae Lemaitre, 1999
- Parapagurus stenorhinus Lemaitre, 1999
- Parapagurus wolffi Lemaitre, 1999
