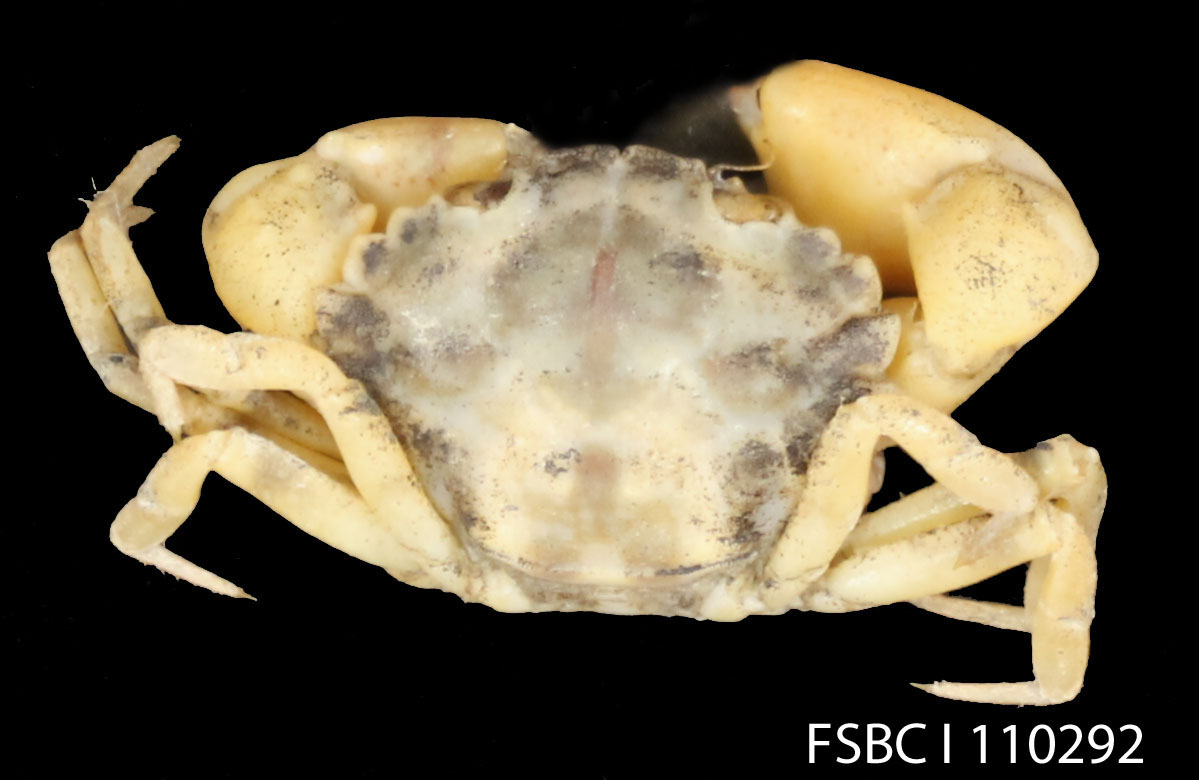

Scientific classification
- Kingdom: Animalia
- Phylum: Arthropoda
- Class: Malacostraca
- Order: Decapoda
- Suborder: Pleocyemata
- Infraorder: Brachyura
- Family: Panopeidae
- Genus: Panopeus
- Species: P. occidentalis

Binomial name
- Panopeus occidentalis Saussure, 1857

= Panopeus occidentalis =

Furrowed mud crab

Panopeus occidentalis, also known as the furrowed mud crab, is a true crab belonging to the infraorder Brachyura. It can grow up to 16.67 mm in width. It is native to the western Atlantic Ocean, its range extending from North Carolina to Florida, the Caribbean Sea, the Gulf of Mexico, the West Indies, the Guianas and Brazil, as far south as the state of Santa Catarina. Its depth range is down to about 20 m (66 ft).
