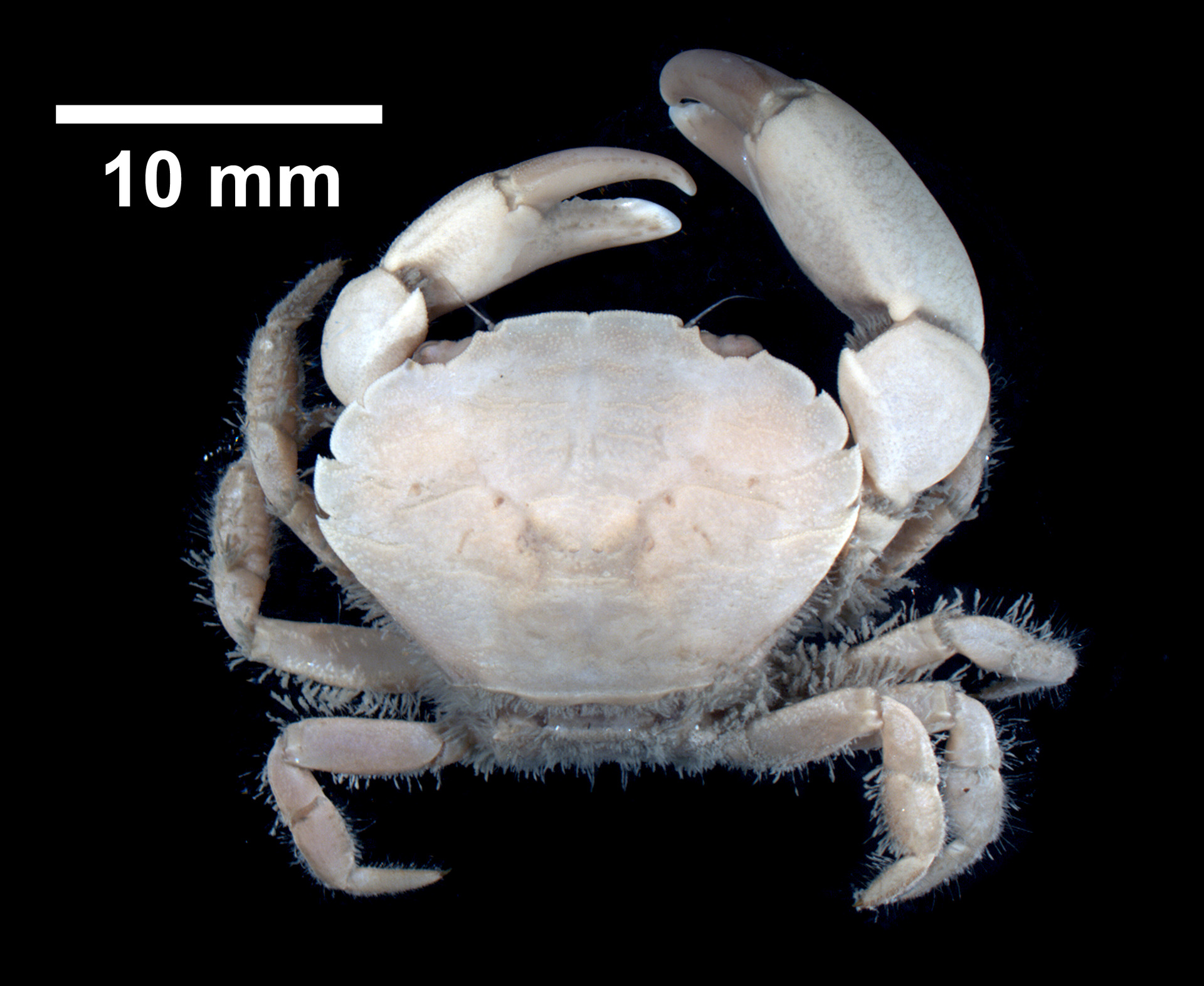

Scientific classification
- Kingdom: Animalia
- Phylum: Arthropoda
- Clade: Pancrustacea
- Class: Malacostraca
- Order: Decapoda
- Suborder: Pleocyemata
- Infraorder: Brachyura
- Family: Panopeidae
- Genus: Eurypanopeus
- Species: E. depressus

Binomial name
- Eurypanopeus depressus (Smith 1869)

Synonyms
- Panopeus depressus Smith, 1869

= Eurypanopeus depressus =

Species of crab

Eurypanopeus depressus, the flatback mud crab or depressed mud crab, is a true crab belonging to the infraorder Brachyura and the family Panopeidae. It is native to the western Atlantic Ocean and is often found in estuaries and lagoons, commonly living in close association with oysters.

== Description ==
The flatback mud crab is a small species of crab up to 13 mm (0.5 in) long with a noticeably flattened, oval carapace, with four blunt teeth on either side. In colour, this crab is dark olive brown or olive grey, often somewhat mottled, with dark brown limbs. One chela (claw) is much bigger than the other and the underside of the body and the limbs are a pale colour.

== Distribution and habitat ==
The flatback mud crab is found in the sub-tropical and temperate waters of the western Atlantic Ocean. Its range extends from Massachusetts to Florida and Texas, the Caribbean Sea, Bermuda, the Dutch West Indies and Uruguay. It occurs in the intertidal zone and the shallow sub-littoral zone, down to depths of about 27 m (90 ft). It is tolerant of water of low salinities and occurs in estuaries. It is common in the Indian River Lagoon. It is generally associated with oysters, hiding between them and inside their valves.

== Ecology ==
This crab has an omnivorous diet which includes algae, detritus, oyster spats, polychaete worms, sponges, amphipods and other small crustaceans. When fully submerged it moves about on the substrate but when exposed by the retreating tide it conceals itself, being particularly associated with beds of the eastern oyster (Crassostrea virginica). It cannot withstand desiccation so it chooses moist places in which to hide. It shares its habitat with the black-fingered mud crab (Panopeus herbstii).

The flatback mud crab is sometimes parasitised by Loxothylacus panopaei, a species of parasitic barnacle that develops inside a host crab, extruding a brood sac that the crab then carries under its abdomen and treats as it would its own eggs.
