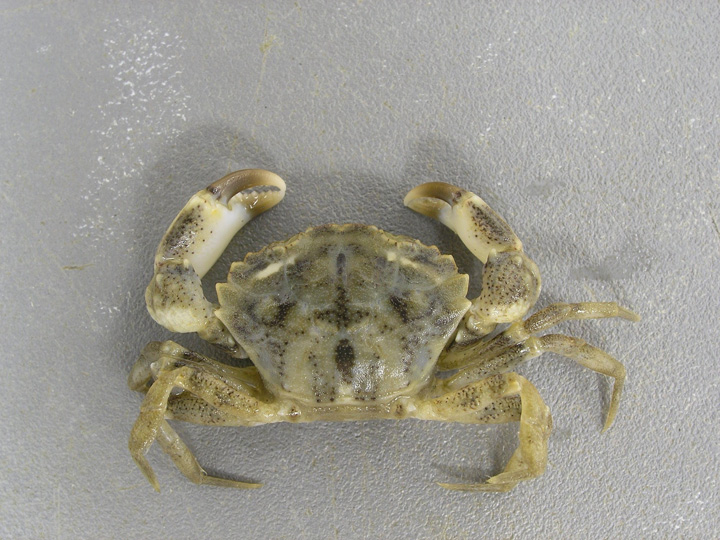

Scientific classification
- Kingdom: Animalia
- Phylum: Arthropoda
- Class: Malacostraca
- Order: Decapoda
- Suborder: Pleocyemata
- Infraorder: Brachyura
- Family: Panopeidae
- Genus: Dyspanopeus
- Species: D. texanus

Binomial name
- Dyspanopeus texanus (Stimpson, 1859)

= Dyspanopeus texanus =

Species of crab

Dyspanopeus texanus (formerly Panopeus texanus or Neopanope texana) is a species of crab known as the Texas mud crab.

== Overview ==
Dyspanopeus texanus are found in the phylum Arthropoda, subphylum Crustacea, order of Decapoda, and superfamily Xanthiadae. This Xanthiadae superfamily was adopted before the 2000s by crustacean workers and has continued to gain acceptance over the last few decades. However, some other crustacean scientists have pointed out the inconsistent criteria upon which generic distinctions of xanthoid crabs are based. The differences between carapaces (shell) and cheliped (distinct, large claw appendage) morphology remain unclear. It is because of this, and the lack of information about the larval and postlarval stages of certain xanthoids that the families distinguishing different xanthoids have shifted so much over time.

== Physical description ==
The Dyspanopeus texanus have a generally similar body to many other crustaceans. Its main carapace is a hexagonal shape with rivets on the sides closest to its eyes. D. texanus has four appendages on each side of its body, which are used for walking and swimming. There is a fifth appendage on each side of the crab closest to its eyes, which are called the chelipeds. These appendages have a relatively medium to small sized claw at the ends of them, which are used to attack prey. In many other species of crabs, one of these main claws are usually extremely large and are used to fight other males in order to gain the attention of females for mating.

== Distribution ==
The Dyspanopeus texanus are also one of the most abundant and dominant crab species in the coastal lagoons of southwestern Gulf of Mexico, including Términos, Tamiahua, and Madre. The Texas Mud Crabs are also known as euryhaline species, which means that they can adapt to wide ranges of salinity, which is why they have been historically found living on macroalgae, seagrasses, and submerged aquatic vegetation. In a study using different Carbon isotopes to determine the trophic levels of different xanthoid crabs, it found that D. texanus occupy the higher trophic levels in these ecosystems, meaning their diets are likely to consist of mostly primary producers like zooplankton and red algae.

== Reproduction ==
Knowledge of the reproduction of xanthoid crabs is quite sparse. The only information that could be acquired of the D. texanus, as observed in the Laguna de Términos, was that they are sexually mature at sizes as small as five millimeters wide. That’s a little more than an eighth of an inch on a ruler, barely a thumbnail’s width.

For another Xanthid crab called Neopanope sayi, there is a bit more information on the matter. For the males of their species, the reproductive system consists of the tests, vasa deferentia, penes, and pleopods. “Nonmotile spermatozoa” leave the testes as individual cells, which are encapsulated within the anterior vasa deferentia. The spermatophores that result are transparent, delicate sphere about 0.2 millimeters in diameter. Spermatophores contain several hundred gametes that are stored in the median vasa deferentia until the males release them to fertilize a female’s egg.

The females of the Neopanope sayi have a vagina, vulva, and two-lobed ovaries: one extending above their hepatopancreas and the other along the side of their digestive tract. Just before the females begin releasing their eggs into the water (spawning), their ovaries contain a large number of dark green eggs. When these species copulates, the males’ spermatophores are pumped by a “piston-like” motion of a pleopod into the gonopod, which are likely transferred to the females’ vagina.
