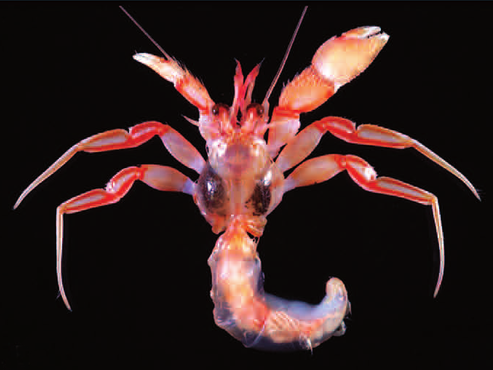
- Strobopagurus sibogae

Scientific classification
- Domain: Eukaryota
- Kingdom: Animalia
- Phylum: Arthropoda
- Class: Malacostraca
- Order: Decapoda
- Suborder: Pleocyemata
- Infraorder: Anomura
- Family: Parapaguridae
- Genus: Strobopagurus; Lemaitre, 1989

Species
- Strobopagurus breviacus (Lemaitre, 2004); Strobopagurus gracilipes (A. Milne-Edwards, 1891); Strobopagurus sibogae (de Saint Laurent, 1972)

= Strobopagurus =

Strobopagurus Temporal range: 0.0117–0 Ma

Genus of crustaceans

Strobopagurus is a genus of hermit crabs in the family Parapaguridae which contains three species. The species within this genus live in oceans at depths from 5.5 to 965 meters.
