= Paragiopagurus =

Scientific classification
- Domain: Eukaryota
- Kingdom: Animalia
- Phylum: Arthropoda
- Class: Malacostraca
- Order: Decapoda
- Suborder: Pleocyemata
- Infraorder: Anomura
- Family: Parapaguridae
- Genus: Paragiopagurus; Lemaitre, 1996

Genus of crustaceans

Paragiopagurus is a genus of hermit crabs in the family Parapaguridae, that contains 25 species. Members of this genus live at depths from 116 to 2,067 meters.

== Species ==
- Paragiopagurus acutus (de Saint Laurent, 1972)
- Paragiopagurus atkinsonae Landschoff & Lemaitre, 2017
- Paragiopagurus bicarinatus (de Saint Laurent, 1972)
- Paragiopagurus boletifer (de Saint Laurent, 1972)
- Paragiopagurus bougainvillei (Lemaitre, 1994)
- Paragiopagurus diogenes (Whitelegge, 1900)
- Paragiopagurus fasciatus Lemaitre & Poupin, 2003
- Paragiopagurus hirsutus (de Saint Laurent, 1972)
- Paragiopagurus hobbiti (Macpherson, 1983)
- Paragiopagurus insolitus Lemaitre, 1997
- Paragiopagurus laperousei Lemaitre, 2013
- Paragiopagurus macrocerus (Forest, 1955)
- Paragiopagurus orthotenes Lemaitre, 2013
- Paragiopagurus oxychelos Lemaitre, 2013
- Paragiopagurus pacificus (Edmondson, 1925)
- Paragiopagurus pilimanus (A. Milne-Edwards, 1880)
- Paragiopagurus rugosus (de Saint Laurent, 1972)
- Paragiopagurus ruticheles (A. Milne-Edwards, 1891)
- Paragiopagurus schnauzer Lemaitre, 2006
- Paragiopagurus sculptochela (Zarenkov, 1990)
- Paragiopagurus trilineatus Lemaitre, 2013
- Paragiopagurus tuberculosus (de Saint Laurent, 1972)
- Paragiopagurus umbonatus Lemaitre, 2013
- Paragiopagurus ventilatus Lemaitre, 2004
- Paragiopagurus wallisi (Lemaitre, 1994)
