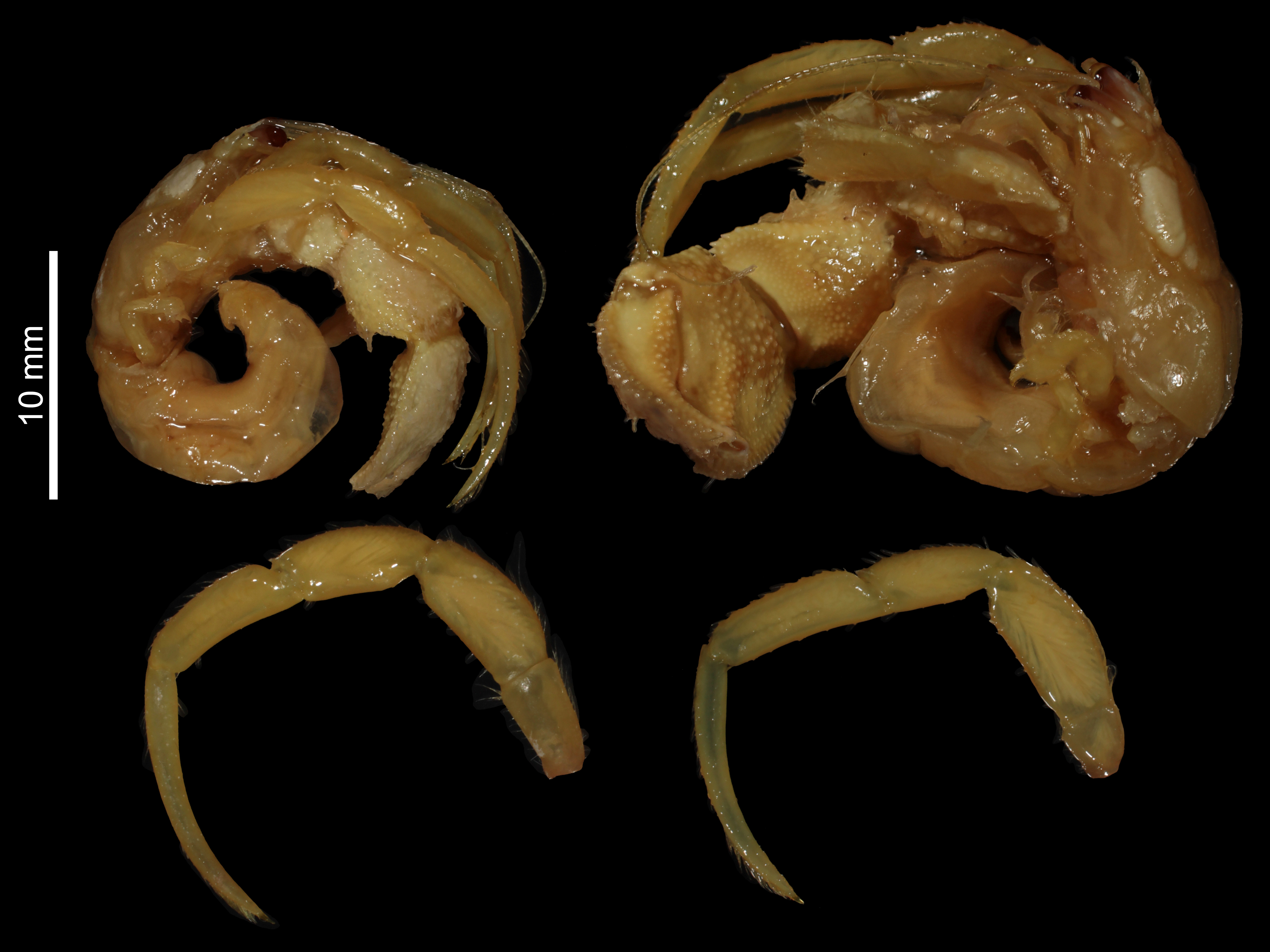
- Oncopagurus stockmani

Scientific classification
- Kingdom: Animalia
- Phylum: Arthropoda
- Clade: Pancrustacea
- Class: Malacostraca
- Order: Decapoda
- Suborder: Pleocyemata
- Infraorder: Anomura
- Family: Parapaguridae
- Genus: Oncopagurus

= Oncopagurus =

Oncopagurus Temporal range: 0.0117–0 Ma

Genus of crustaceans

Oncopagurus, is a genus of marine hermit crabs in the family Parapaguridae, which contains 25 species. Members of this genus live from 40 to 2,308 meters below the surface.

== Species ==
- Oncopagurus africanus (de Saint Laurent, 1972)
- Oncopagurus bicristatus (A. Milne-Edwards, 1880)
- Oncopagurus bifidus Lemaitre, 2014
- Oncopagurus brevis Lemaitre, 2014
- Oncopagurus cidaris Lemaitre, 1996
- Oncopagurus conicus Lemaitre, 2006
- Oncopagurus crusoei Lemaitre, 2014
- Oncopagurus curvispina (de Saint Laurent, 1974)
- Oncopagurus elevatus Lemaitre, 2014
- Oncopagurus elongatus Lemaitre, 2014
- Oncopagurus glebosus Lemaitre, 1997
- Oncopagurus gracilis (Henderson, 1888)
- Oncopagurus haigae (de Saint Laurent, 1972)
- Oncopagurus indicus (Alcock, 1905)
- Oncopagurus minutus (Henderson, 1896)
- Oncopagurus mironovi Zhadan, 1997
- Oncopagurus monstrosus (Alcock, 1894)
- Oncopagurus oimos Lemaitre, 1998
- Oncopagurus orientalis (de Saint Laurent, 1972)
- Oncopagurus petilus Lemaitre, 2014
- Oncopagurus pollicis Lemaitre, 2014
- Oncopagurus rossanae Lemaitre, 2014
- Oncopagurus spiniartus Lemaitre, 2014
- Oncopagurus stockmani Zhadan, 1997
- Oncopagurus tuamotu (Lemaitre, 1994)
