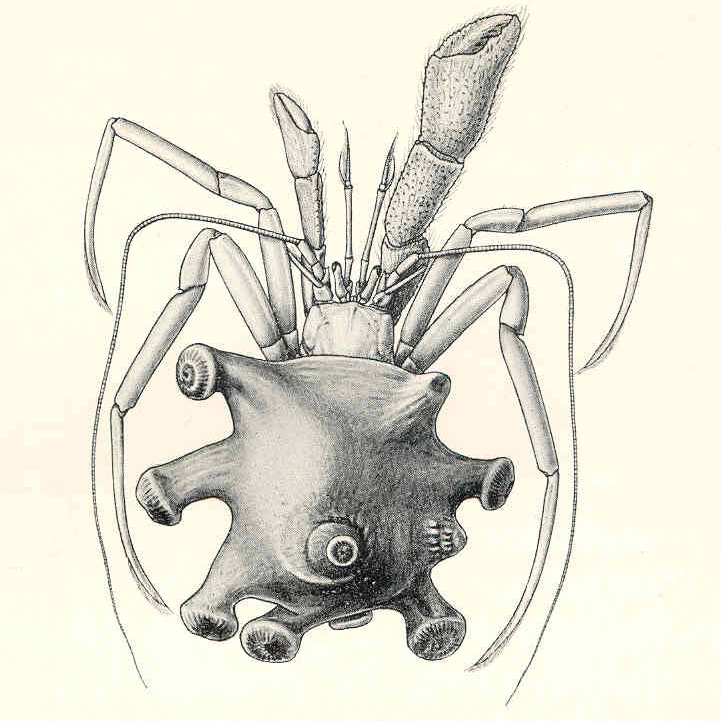
- Illustration

Scientific classification
- Kingdom: Animalia
- Phylum: Arthropoda
- Class: Malacostraca
- Order: Decapoda
- Suborder: Pleocyemata
- Infraorder: Anomura
- Family: Parapaguridae
- Genus: Parapagurus
- Species: P. pilosimanus

Binomial name
- Parapagurus pilosimanus Smith, 1879

Synonyms
- Eupagurus jacobii A. Milne-Edwards, 1880; Sympagurus Grimaldii A. Milne-Edwards & Bouvier, 1897

= Parapagurus pilosimanus =

Species of crustacean

Parapagurus pilosimanus is a species of hermit crab within the genus Parapagurus, of which it is also the type species. It has a cosmopolitan distribution from Nova Scotia to Guyana and a depth range of more than 100 m (330 ft).
