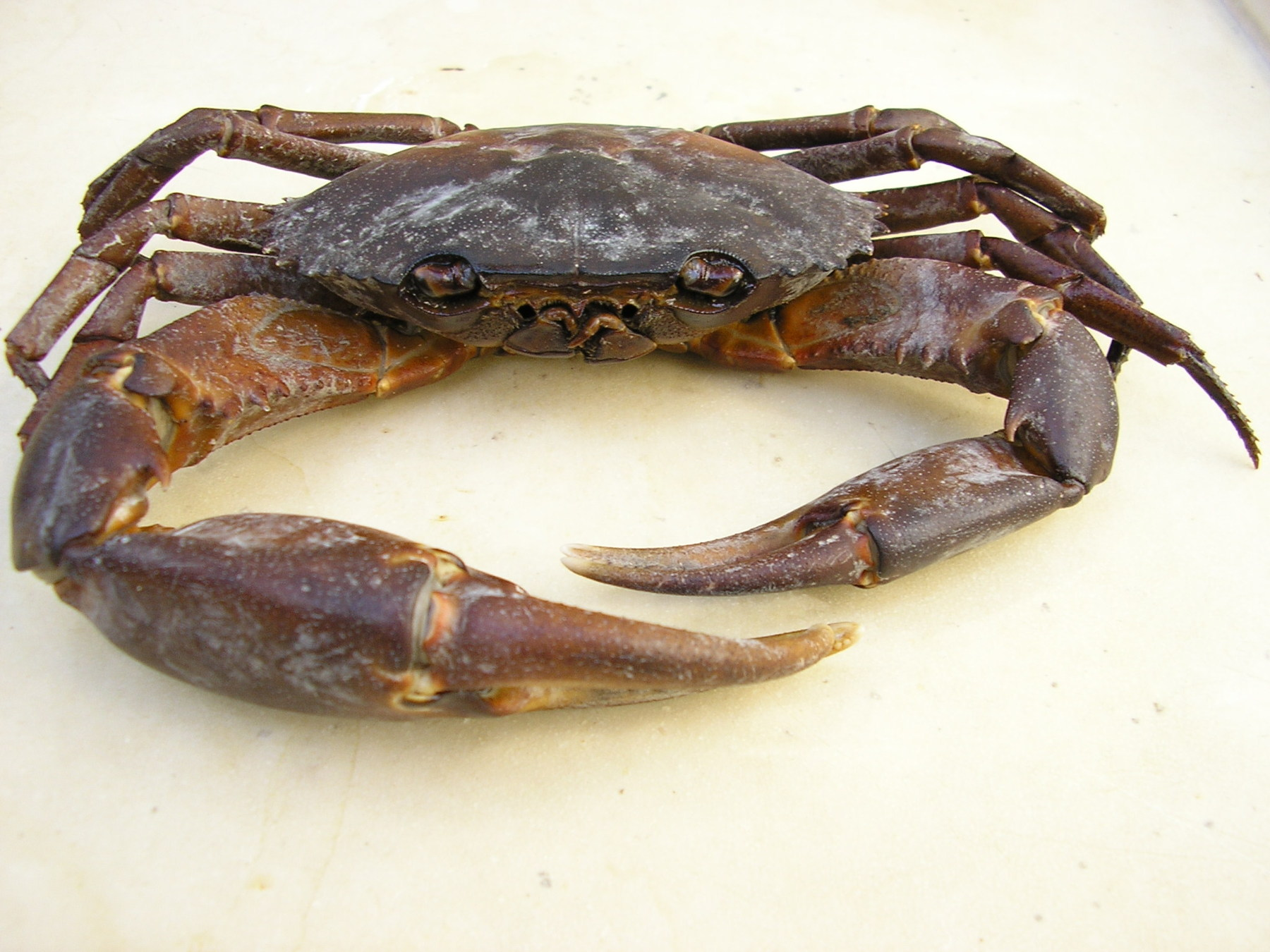
- Eurytium tristani

Scientific classification
- Kingdom: Animalia
- Phylum: Arthropoda
- Clade: Pancrustacea
- Class: Malacostraca
- Order: Decapoda
- Suborder: Pleocyemata
- Infraorder: Brachyura
- Family: Panopeidae
- Genus: Eurytium; Stimpson, 1859

= Eurytium =

Genus of crabs

Eurytium is a genus of crab in the family Panopeidae, containing the following species:

- Eurytium affine (Streets & Kingsley, 1877)
- Eurytium albidigitum Rathbun, 1933
- †Eurytium crenulatum Rathbun, 1918
- †Eurytium granulosum Schweitzer, Velez-Juarbe, Martinez, Hull, Feldmann & Santos, 2008
- Eurytium limosum (Say, 1818)
- Eurytium tristani Rathbun, 1906
