= Joel W. Martin =

U.S. marine biologist and carcinologist (born 1955)

- Born: 1955 (age 70–71)
- Education: Florida State University
- Known for: Studies of morphology and systematics of marine decapod crustaceans
- Scientific career
- Fields: Marine biology
- Workplaces: Natural History Museum of Los Angeles County
- Academic advisors: Lawrence G. Abele

Joel W. Martin (born 1955) is an American marine biologist and invertebrate zoologist who is currently Chief of the Division of Invertebrate Studies and Curator of Crustacea at the Natural History Museum of Los Angeles County (NHMLAC). His main area of research is the morphology and systematics of marine decapod crustaceans (crabs, shrimps, lobsters and their relatives).

Martin received a doctorate from the Florida State University in 1986. He has published more than 100 scientific articles and books mainly on morphology, natural history, taxonomy, and evolutionary relationships of both decapods and of branchiopods of ephemeral pools. His work also includes studies on the animals inhabiting deep-sea hydrothermal vents and cold seeps. He is perhaps best known for his 2001 publication of an updated classification of recent crustaceans. In addition to his research on marine invertebrates, he has been active on communicating questions of global biodiversity and on the history and interaction of science and religious faith.

== Selected publications ==
- Bauer, Raymond T.; Martin, Joel W., eds. (1991). Crustacean Sexual Biology. New York: Columbia University Press. p. 355. ISBN 978-0-231-06880-2.
- Martin, Joel W.; Davis, George E. (2001). "An Updated Classification of the Recent Crustacea" (PDF). Science Series No. 39. Natural History Museum of Los Angeles County: 124.
- Martin, Joel W.; Crandall, Keith A.; Felder, Darryl L., eds. (2009). Decapod Crustacean Phylogenetics. Crustacean Issues. Vol. 18. Boca Raton, Florida: CRC Press, Taylor & Francis. p. 632. ISBN 978-1-4200-9258-5.
- Martin, Joel W. (2010). The Prism and the Rainbow: A Christian Explains Why Evolution Is Not a Threat. Johns Hopkins University Press. p. 192. ISBN 9780801894787.
