= Sidney Irving Smith =

American zoologist

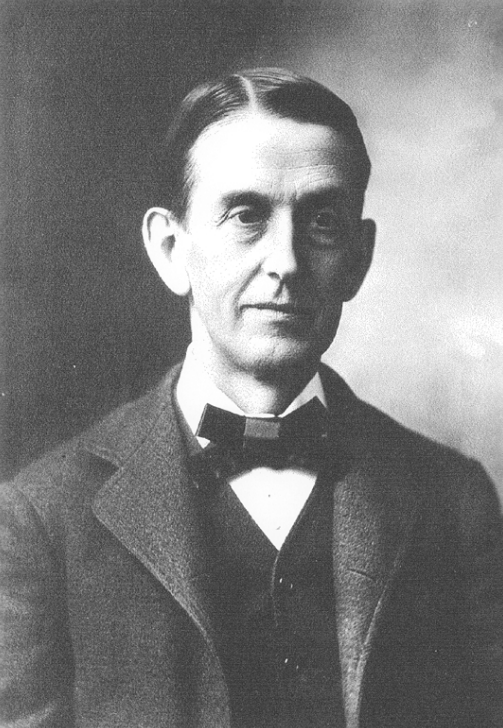
- Sidney Irving Smith
- Born: 18 February 1843; Norway, Maine
- Died: 6 May 1926 (aged 83); New Haven, Connecticut
- Education: Sheffield Scientific School
- Scientific career
- Fields: zoologist
- Author abbrev. (zoology): S. I. Smith

Sidney Irving Smith (February 18, 1843, in Norway, Maine – May 6, 1926, in New Haven, Connecticut) was an American zoologist.

== Private life ==
Sidney Smith was the son of Elliot Smith and Lavinia Barton. His brother in law was Addison Emery Verrill. Smith married Eugenia Pocahontas Barber in New Haven, Connecticut, on June 29, 1882. The couple had no children, and Eugenia died on March 14, 1916. Smith suffered from hereditary glaucoma, rendering him partially sighted from 1906, and completely blind some years before his death. He died on May 6, 1926, of throat cancer.

== Education and career ==
In his youth, Sidney Irving Smith became expert on the fauna around his home town, and an expert at making collections, particularly of insects. He studied at the Sheffield Scientific School of Yale University, and received his Ph.B. in 1867. Yale University conferred upon him the honorary degree of M.A. in 1887. He stayed on at Yale, initially as an assistant, but from 1875 as the first professor of comparative anatomy, a post he retained until his retirement in 1906. Thereafter, Smith remained at Yale as professor emeritus.

Having begun as an entomologist (being State Entomologist of Maine and Connecticut for a number of years), Smith changed relatively early in his career to the study of crustaceans, probably because of his work with the United States Fish Commission. He participated in many field excursions, sometimes in collaboration with Verrill or with Louis Agassiz. Smith was the chief zoologist during the dredging of Lake Superior carried out by the United States Lake Survey in 1871, and the dredging in the region of St. George's Banks in 1872 carried out by the United States Coast Survey. In 1884, Smith was elected to the National Academy of Sciences.

== Legacy ==
Smith produced more than 70 original papers. His collections are now housed in the Peabody Museum of Natural History at Yale and at the National Museum of Natural History.

Sidney Irving Smith was honoured in the specific epithets of a number of species. They include Lembos smithi Holmes, 1905, Metapenaeopsis smithi (Schmitt, 1924), Oxyurostylis smithi Calman, 1912, Pandarus smithi Rathbun, 1886 and Siphonoecetes smithianus Rathbun, 1908.

Taxa named by Sidney Irving Smith include:

- Callinectes danae S. I. Smith, 1869
- Cardisoma crassum S. I. Smith, 1870
- Eumunida S. I. Smith, 1883
- Eumunida picta S. I. Smith, 1883
- Eunephrops S. I. Smith, 1885
- Eunephrops bairdii S. I. Smith, 1885
- Hepatella Smith in Verrill, 1869
- Hyalella S. I. Smith, 1874
- Macrobrachium ohione S. I. Smith, 1874
- Neomysis americana (S. I. Smith, 1873)
- Orchestia agilis S. I. Smith, 1874
- Parapaguridae S. I. Smith, 1882
- Polycheles sculptus S. I. Smith, 1880
- Uca pugnax (S. I. Smith, 1870)
- Xiphopenaeus hartii Smith, 1869
- Acanthephyra brevirostris S. I. Smith, 1885
- Admete nodosa Verrill & Smith, 1885
- Ampithoe longimana S. I. Smith, 1873
- Ampithoe valida S. I. Smith, 1873
- Arctus americanus S. I. Smith, 1869
- Argulus laticauda S. I. Smith, 1873
- Argulus latus S. I. Smith, 1873
- Argulus megalops S. I. Smith, 1873
- Benthonectes filipes S. I. Smith, 1885
- Benthonectes S. I. Smith, 1885
- Beringius brychius (Verrill & Smith, 1885)
- Byblis serrata S. I. Smith, 1873
- Bythocaris gracilis S. I. Smith, 1885
- Bythocaris nana S. I. Smith, 1885
- Colletes perforator Smith, 1869
- Cymadusa compta (S. I. Smith, 1873)
- Dyspanopeus sayi (S. I. Smith, 1869)
- Elasmopus laevis S. I. Smith, 1873
- Elasmopus levis (S. I. Smith, 1873)
- Ephyrina benedicti S. I. Smith, 1885
- Ephyrina S. I. Smith, 1885
- Eucratopsis Smith, 1869
- Eurypanopeus depressus (S. I. Smith, 1869)
- Evibacus Smith, 1869
- Evibacus princeps Smith, 1869
- Gammarus annulatus S. I. Smith, 1873
- Hadropenaeus modestus (S. I. Smith, 1885)
- Haliporus modestus (S. I. Smith, 1885)
- Haliporus robustus (S. I. Smith, 1885)
- Heterogenys microphthalma (S. I. Smith, 1885)
- Heteromysis formosa S. I. Smith, 1873
- Heteromysis S. I. Smith, 1873
- Hippolyte zostericola (S. I. Smith, 1873)
- Hyalopecten undatus (A. E. Verrill & S. Smith, 1885)
- Hymenopenaeus modestus S. I. Smith, 1885
- Hymenopenaeus robustus S. I. Smith, 1885
- Melita nitida S. I. Smith, 1873
- Metapenaeopsis goodei (S. I. Smith, 1885)
- Metapenaeus goodei (S. I. Smith, 1885)
- Munidopsis crassa S. I. Smith, 1885
- Munidopsis similis S. I. Smith, 1885
- Mysis stenolepis S. I. Smith, 1873
- Neopanope sayi (S. I. Smith, 1869)
- Neopanope texana sayi (S. I. Smith, 1869)
- Palaemon ensiculus Smith, 1869
- Panopeus hartii S. I. Smith, 1869
- Panopeus harttii S. I. Smith, 1869
- Panopeus obesus S. I. Smith, 1869
- Panopeus sayi S. I. Smith, 1869
- Panulirus echinatus Smith, 1869
- Parapenaeus goodei S. I. Smith, 1885
- Parapenaeus megalops Smith, 1885
- Parapenaeus S. I. Smith, 1885
- Penaeopsis goodei (S. I. Smith, 1885)
- Penaeopsis megalops (Smith, 1885)
- Pleoticus robustus (S. I. Smith, 1885)
- Pontonia margarita Smith, 1869
- Rimapenaeus similis (S. I. Smith, 1885)
- Scyllarus americanus (S. I. Smith, 1869)
- Scyphacella arenicola S. I. Smith, 1873
- Scyphacella S. I. Smith, 1873
- Thyasira grandis Verrill & Smith, 1885
- Thyasira plicata Verrill & Smith, 1885
- Trachypenaeus similis (S. I. Smith, 1885)
- Xiphopenaeus Smith, 1869
