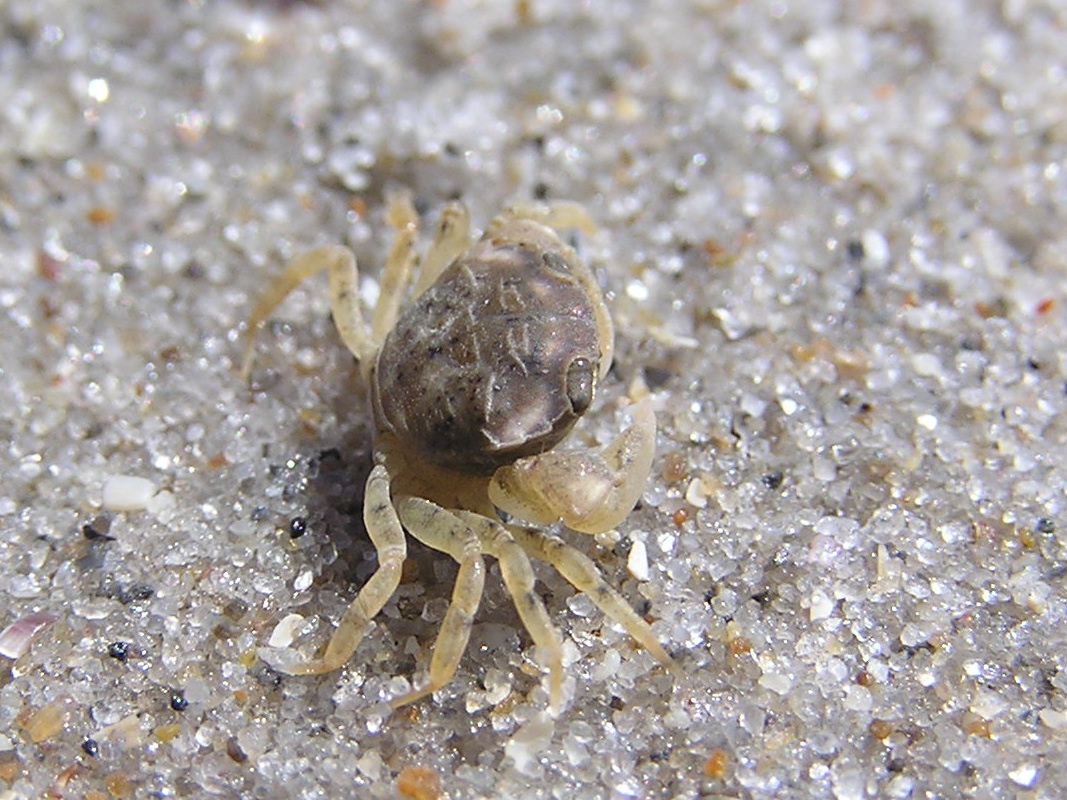

Scientific classification
- Kingdom: Animalia
- Phylum: Arthropoda
- Clade: Pancrustacea
- Class: Malacostraca
- Order: Decapoda
- Suborder: Pleocyemata
- Infraorder: Brachyura
- Family: Panopeidae
- Genus: Rhithropanopeus; Rathbun, 1898
- Species: R. harrisii

Binomial name
- Rhithropanopeus harrisii (Gould, 1841)

Synonyms
- Pilumnus harrisii Gould, 1841; Pilumnus tridentatus Maitland, 1874; Heteropanope tridentatus Tesch, 1922; Panopeus wurdemannii Gibbes, 1850

= Rhithropanopeus =

Rhithropanopeus harrisii

Species of crab

Rhithropanopeus harrisii (common names include the Zuiderzee crab, dwarf crab, estuarine mud crab, Harris mud crab, white-fingered mud crab, and white-tipped mud crab) is a small omnivorous crab native to Atlantic coasts of the Americas, from New Brunswick to Veracruz.

R. harrisii is usually found in brackish water, but can also be found in freshwater. It likes to live on stones and in oyster beds. The crab can reach a maximum size of 20 millimetres (0.8 in). It has an olive-green-brownish color, sometimes with dark spots on its carapace.

It is a common inhabitant of Texas and Florida estuaries, but was later introduced all over the world. In 1937, it was discovered to be invading the San Francisco Bay's brackish waters and adjacent fresh waters of the California Central Valley. It was also recently discovered in the Third Lock Lake in Panama, a man-made lake intended to be a part of the Panama Canal.

R. harrisii was first discovered in Europe in the Zuider Zee, the Netherlands, and is now also found in Denmark, Belgium, Germany, France, Poland, Estonia, Finland, Russia, Portugal, Spain, Italy, Romania and Bulgaria, from the Black Sea and Caspian Sea.

In the British Isles, R. harrisii has only been observed in Roath Docks, Cardiff, which have lower salinity (12‰) than the surrounding waters.

Breeding freshwater populations have been found in the Brazos River basin in Texas, notably the Possum Kingdom State Park and Lake Granbury. Populations have also been discovered in Lake Texoma and Lake E.V. Spence. Its presence in the Baltic Sea is blamed for a negative ecosystem shift.

A record of this species was made in Brazil, but might represent a misidentification.
