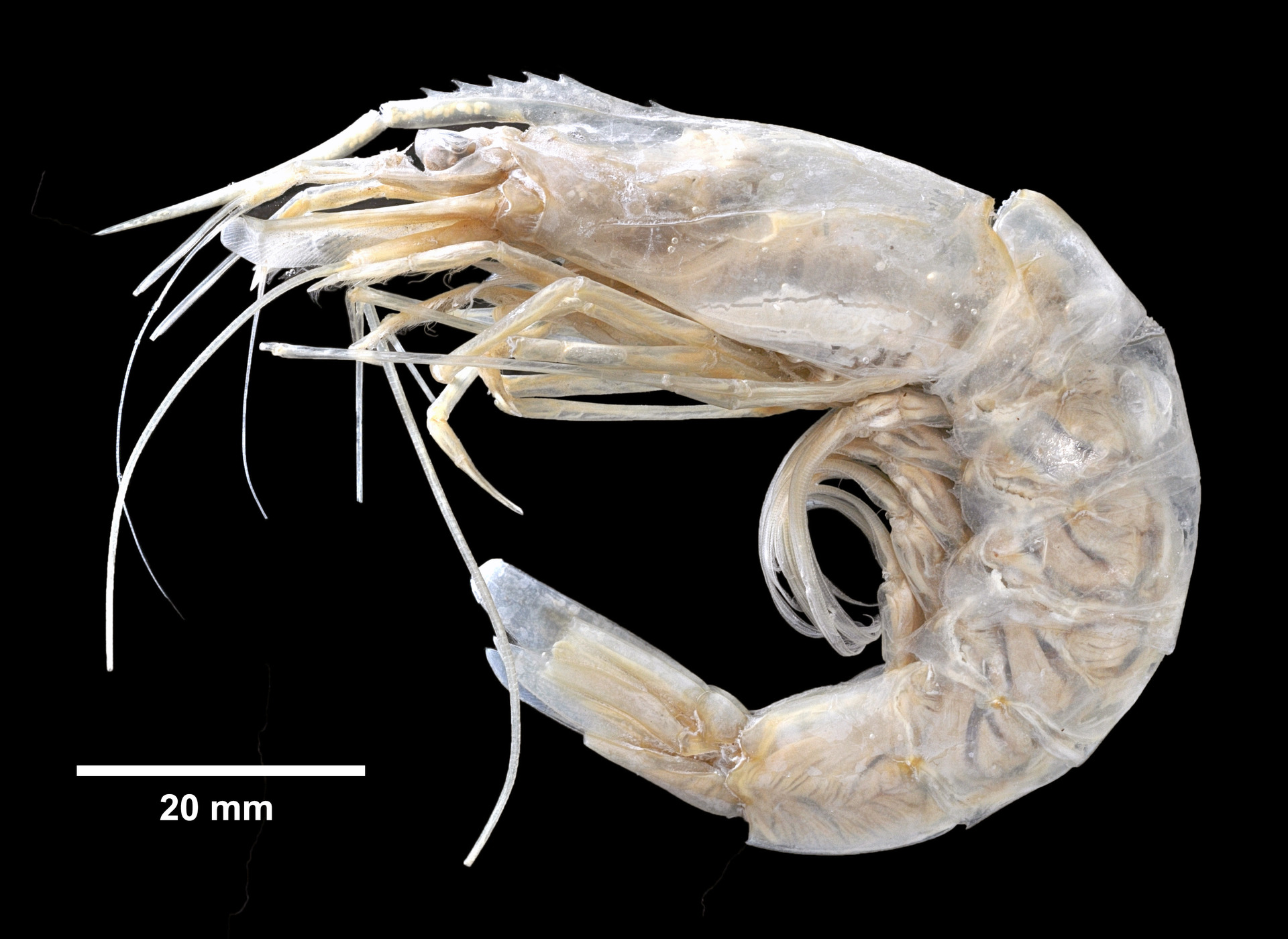
- Xiphopenaeus kroyeri

Scientific classification
- Domain: Eukaryota
- Kingdom: Animalia
- Phylum: Arthropoda
- Class: Malacostraca
- Order: Decapoda
- Suborder: Dendrobranchiata
- Family: Penaeidae
- Genus: Xiphopenaeus; Smith, 1869

= Xiphopenaeus =

Genus of crustaceans

Xiphopenaeus is a genus of prawn in the family Penaeidae. It contains the following species:

- Xiphopenaeus baueri Carvalho-Batista, Terossi, Zara, Mantelatto & Costa, 2020
- Xiphopenaeus dincao Carvalho-Batista, Terossi, Zara, Mantelatto & Costa, 2020
- Xiphopenaeus kroyeri (Heller, 1862)
- Xiphopenaeus riveti Bouvier, 1907

Xiphopenaeus kroyeri and X. riveti were previously considered to be two names for the same species, but genetic analysis in 2006 confirmed they are two distinct species. X. kroyeri occurs in the Atlantic Ocean, while X. riveti lives in the Pacific Ocean. X. kroyeri, the seabob shrimp, is fished off the coast of Brazil.
