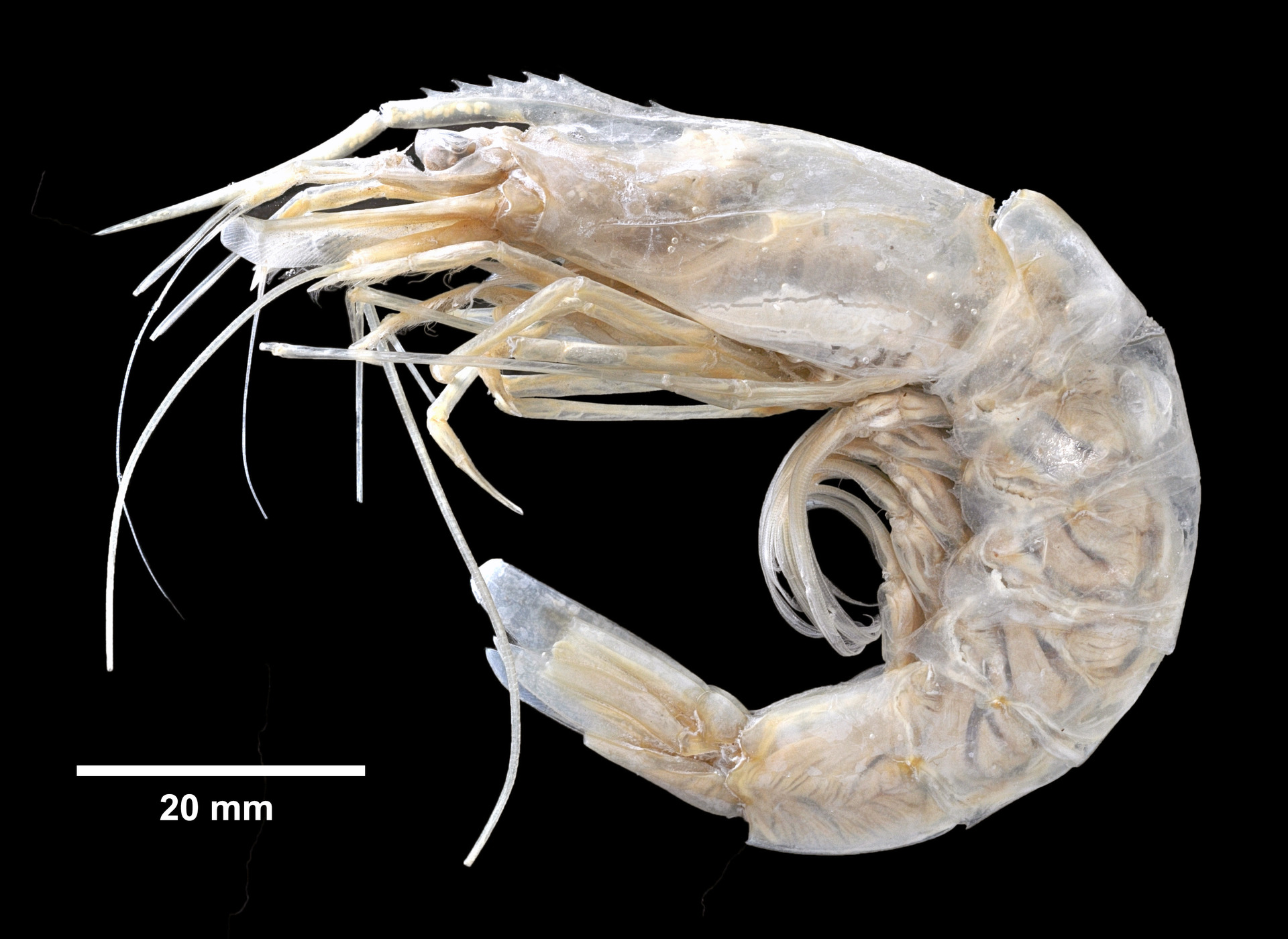

Scientific classification
- Kingdom: Animalia
- Phylum: Arthropoda
- Clade: Pancrustacea
- Class: Malacostraca
- Order: Decapoda
- Suborder: Dendrobranchiata
- Family: Penaeidae
- Genus: Xiphopenaeus
- Species: X. kroyeri

Binomial name
- Xiphopenaeus kroyeri (Heller, 1862)

Synonyms
- Penaeus kroyeri Heller, 1862; Xiphopenaeus hartii Smith, 1869

= Xiphopenaeus kroyeri =

Species of crustacean

Xiphopenaeus kroyeri, commonly called the Atlantic seabob, or the Atlantic xiphopenaeus, is a commercially important prawn. It is up to 140 mm (5.5 in) long and is the most intensely fished prawn species in the Guianas and along much of the Gulf Coast of the United States.

== Description ==
Adults grow to 70–140 mm (2.8–5.5 in) long, with males only reaching 115 mm (4.5 in). The rostrum has five teeth near the base, but is smooth along the tip, which is greatly elongated and often curves upwards to varying degrees.

== Distribution and fishery ==
X. kroyeri lives in the western Atlantic Ocean from North Carolina to Santa Catarina state, Brazil. It is the most important commercial prawn in parts of the United States from Pensacola (in the Florida Panhandle) to Texas, and in the Guianas. In other areas, such as Mexico, Nicaragua, Honduras, and Trinidad, the fishing effort is only locally intensive. In 2000–2007, the annual catch was greater than 40,000 t (88,000,000 lb).

== Taxonomy ==
Xiphopenaeus kroyeri was first described by Camill Heller in 1862, under the name Penaeus kroyeri. It was transferred to the genus Xiphopenaeus in 1869 by Sidney Irving Smith. X. kroyeri has been considered conspecific with the Pacific species X. riveti, but recent genetic analysis indicates that the two are separate species, and that X. kroyeri (sensu stricto) may even constitute two cryptic species.
