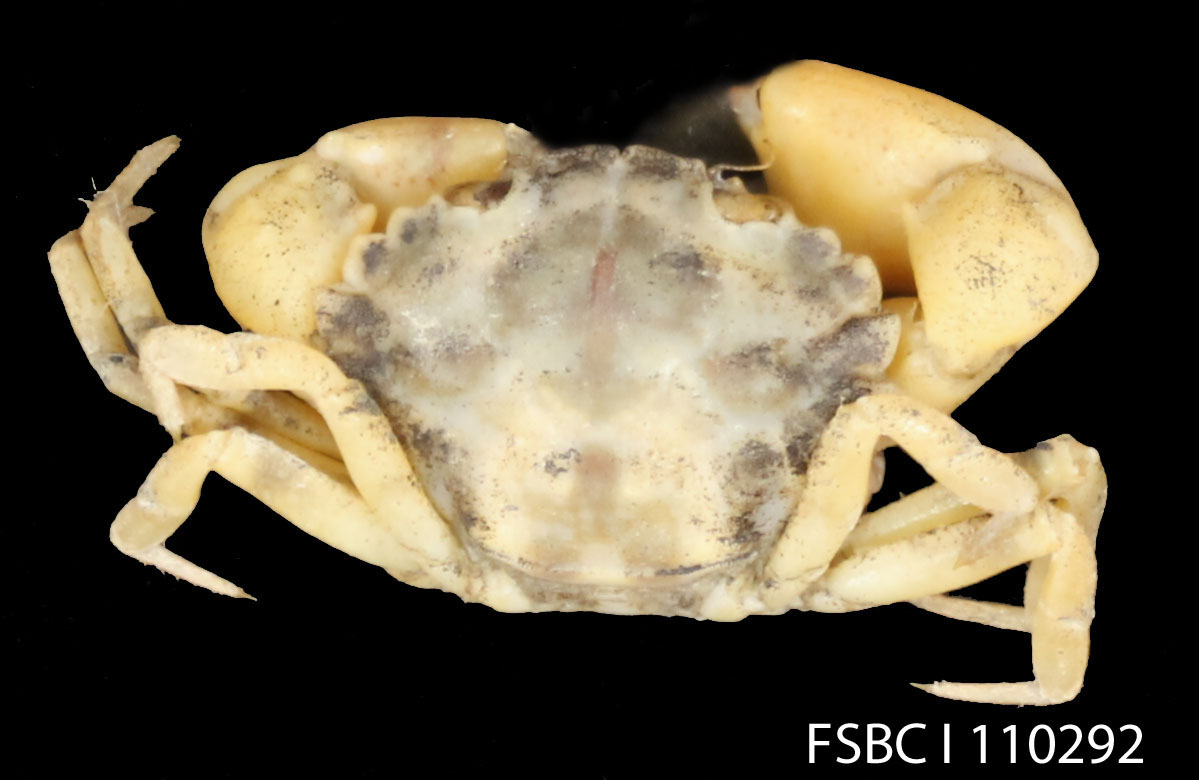
- Furrowed Mud Crab (Panopeus occidentalis)

Scientific classification
- Kingdom: Animalia
- Phylum: Arthropoda
- Class: Malacostraca
- Order: Decapoda
- Suborder: Pleocyemata
- Infraorder: Brachyura
- Family: Panopeidae
- Genus: Panopeus; H. Milne-Edwards, 1834

Type species
- Panopeus herbstii H. Milne-Edwards, 1834

= Panopeus (crab) =

Genus of crabs

Panopeus is a genus of crabs, containing the following species:

- Panopeus africanus A. Milne-Edwards, 1867
- Panopeus americanus de Saussure, 1857
- †Panopeus antepurpureus Rathbun, 1918
- Panopeus austrobesus Williams, 1983
- †Panopeus baldwini (Kooser & Orr, 1973)
- †Panopeus bericus Beschin, Busulini & Tessier, 2013
- †Panopeus bessmanni Collins & Jakobsen, 2003
- Panopeus boekei Rathbun, 1915
- †Panopeus capanemaensis Martins-Neto, 2001
- Panopeus chilensis H. Milne Edwards & Lucas, 1843
- Panopeus convexus A. Milne-Edwards, 1880
- Panopeus diversus Rathbun, 1933
- †Panopeus estellensis Rathbun, 1935
- †Panopeus granulineatus Müller & Collins, 1991
- Panopeus harttii Smith, 1869
- Panopeus herbstii H. Milne Edwards, 1834
- †Panopeus incisus Beschin, Busulini, De Angeli & Tessier, 2007
- †Panopeus jerseyensis Roberts, 1956
- Panopeus lacustris Desbonne in Desbonne & Schramm, 1867
- †Panopeus lauensis Rathbun, 1945
- Panopeus meridionalis Williams, 1983
- †Panopeus muelleri Gatt & De Angeli, 2010
- †Panopeus nanus Portell & Collins, 2004
- Panopeus obesus Smith, 1869
- Panopeus occidentalis de Saussure, 1857
- †Panopeus olearis (Rathbun, 1926)
- †Panopeus paucicarinatus Beschin, Busulini & Tessier in Beschin, Busulini, Fornaciari, Papazzoni & Tessier, 2018
- †Panopeus piramidensis Casadío, Feldmann, Parras & Schweitzer, 2005
- †Panopeus postalensis Beschin, Busulini, Tessier & Zorzin, 2016
- †Panopeus prosakrolophos Schweitzer, 2000
- Panopeus purpureus Lockington, 1877
- Panopeus rugosus A. Milne-Edwards, 1880
- †Panopeus santurbanensis Ceccon & De Angeli, 2019
- Panopeus simpsoni Rathbun, 1930
- †Panopeus soledadensis (Rathbun, 1926)
- †Panopeus torus Schweitzer, 2000
- †Panopeus tridentatus Rathbun, 1918
- †Panopeus veintensis Vega & Nyborg in Vega, Nyborg, Coutiño & Hernández-Monzón, 2008
- †Panopeus viai Müller, 1993
- †Panopeus wronai Müller, 1984
