= Lawrence G. Abele =

American academic (born 1946)

Dr. Larry Abele
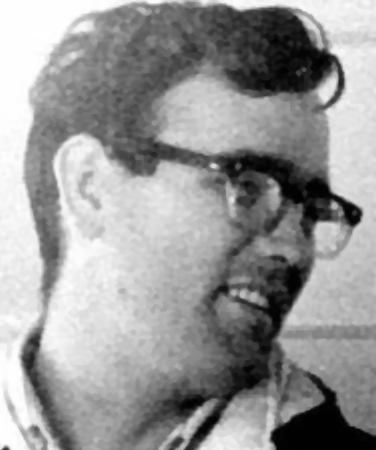
- Abele in 1967
- Born: Lawrence Gordon Abele; March 1, 1946 (age 80); Baltimore, Maryland, U.S.
- Education: Florida State University; University of Miami
- Occupations: Provost Emeritus, Florida State University Director, institute for Academic Leadership
- Spouse: Linda Foster
- Children: Larry; Ken

Lawrence Gordon Abele (born March 1, 1946) is an American academic in the Department of Biological Science and the former Provost at Florida State University, where he is a distinguished professor, In 1994, he was appointed provost at Florida State, a position he held through 2010.

Abele started his career at Florida State in the Department of Biological Sciences in 1973. He later served as associate professor, professor, associate chairman for graduate studies, chairperson, dean, and now serves as provost.

On September 17, 2010, Abele announced that he would be stepping down as provost and vice president of academic affairs at the end of the Fall 2010 semester.

He is an active member of the Gulf of Mexico Fishery Management Council.

== Education ==
- A.A. Dade Junior College in 1966
- B.S. Florida State University in 1968
- M.S. Florida State University in 1970
- Ph.D. University of Miami in 1972
- Post-Doctoral Fellow for the Research Institute in the Republic of Panama
