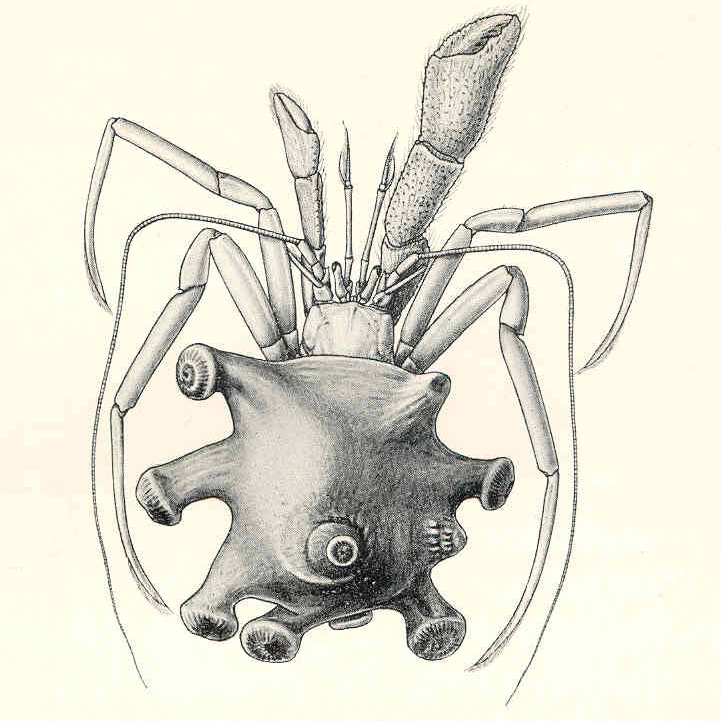
- Illustration of Parapagurus pilosimanus

Scientific classification
- Kingdom: Animalia
- Phylum: Arthropoda
- Clade: Pancrustacea
- Class: Malacostraca
- Order: Decapoda
- Suborder: Pleocyemata
- Infraorder: Anomura
- Superfamily: Paguroidea
- Family: Parapaguridae; S. I. Smith, 1882

= Parapaguridae =

Family of crustaceans

The Parapaguridae are a family of marine hermit crabs from deep waters. Instead of carrying empty gastropod shells like other hermit crabs, they carry colonies of dozen or more sea anemones or zoanthids. Some genera, such as Bivalvopagurus, do not inhabit shells. The following genera are included:

- Bivalvopagurus Lemaitre, 1993
- Oncopagurus Lemaitre, 1996
- Paragiopagurus Lemaitre, 1996
- Parapagurus Smith, 1879
- Strobopagurus Lemaitre, 1989
- Sympagurus Smith, 1883
- Tsunogaipagurus Osawa, 1995
- Typhlopagurus de Saint Laurent, 1972
