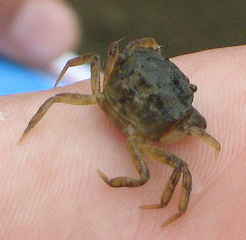
- Dyspanopeus sayi

Scientific classification
- Kingdom: Animalia
- Phylum: Arthropoda
- Clade: Pancrustacea
- Class: Malacostraca
- Order: Decapoda
- Suborder: Pleocyemata
- Infraorder: Brachyura
- Superfamily: Xanthoidea
- Family: Panopeidae; Ortmann, 1893

Synonyms
- Eucratopsidae Stimpson, 1871 (nom. rej.)

= Panopeidae =

Family of crabs

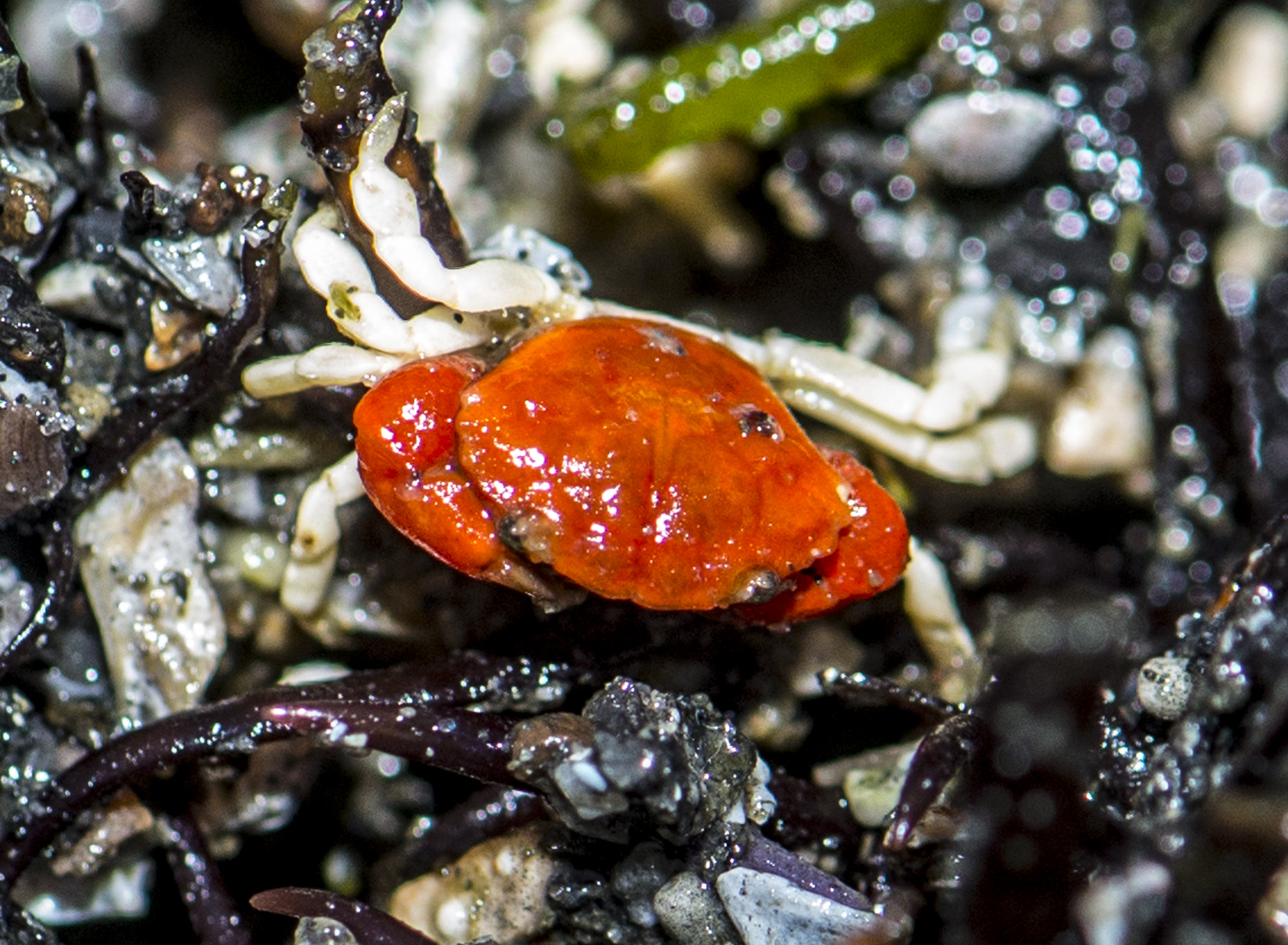
Lophopanopeus bellus, Black-clawed crab, San Luis Obispo County, California

The Panopeidae are a family containing 26 genera of morphologically similar crabs, often known as "mud crabs". Their centers of diversity are the Atlantic Ocean and eastern Pacific Ocean.

== Distribution ==
Most members of the family Panopeidae live in the Atlantic Ocean or eastern Pacific Ocean. Only one species occurs in Australian waters – Homoioplax haswelli.

== Ecology ==
The various genera of the Panopeidae are morphologically similar, partly as a result of many instances of convergent evolution to similar habitats and food preferences.

Crabs of the family Panopeidae are all free-living (not commensal or parasitic), and typically live in soft-bottomed parts of the ocean, lending them the common name "mud crabs" (a name also shared by other organisms). They burrow into the sediment and feed on a variety of marine invertebrates.

== Genera ==
The World Register of Marine Species lists these subfamilies and genera:

- Acantholobulus Felder & Martin, 2003
- †Balcacarcinus Karasawa & Schweitzer, 2006
- †Bittnereus Beschin, Busulini, De Angeli & Tessier, 2007
- †Carinocarcinus Lőrenthey, 1898
- Dyspanopeus Martin & Abele, 1986
- Eucratopsis Smith, 1869
- Eurypanopeus A. Milne-Edwards, 1880
- Eurytium Stimpson, 1859
- †Glyphithyreus Reuss, 1859
- Glyptoplax Smith, 1870
- Hexapanopeus Rathbun, 1898
- †Laevicarcinus Lőrenthey in Lőrenthey & Beurlen, 1929
- Lithopanopeus Felder & Thoma, 2020
- Lophopanopeus Rathbun, 1898
- Metopocarcinus Stimpson, 1860
- Milnepanopeus Thoma & Felder, 2012
- Neopanope A. Milne-Edwards, 1880
- Odontoplax Garth, 1986
- †Pakicarcinus Schweitzer, Feldmann & Gingerich, 2004
- †Palaeograpsus Bittner, 1875
- Panopeus H. Milne Edwards, 1834
- Rhithropanopeus Rathbun, 1898
- †Sereneopeus Collins, 2002
- †Serenopeus Collins, 2002
- †Zovocarcinus De Angeli & Garassino, 2014
