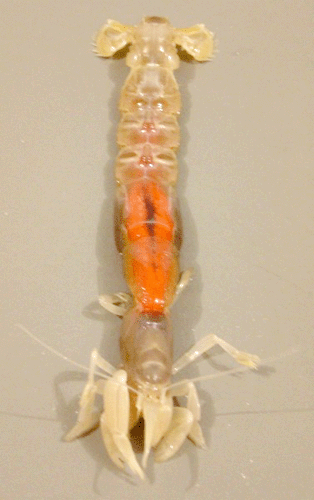

Scientific classification
- Kingdom: Animalia
- Phylum: Arthropoda
- Clade: Pancrustacea
- Class: Malacostraca
- Order: Decapoda
- Suborder: Pleocyemata
- Family: Callianassidae
- Genus: Callichirus
- Species: C. major

Binomial name
- Callichirus major (Say, 1818)

Synonyms
- Callianassa major Say, 1818

= Callichirus major =

Species complex of ghost shrimp

Callichirus major sensu lato is a monophyletic species complex of ghost shrimp in the infraorder Axiidea, found in flat sandy beaches across the Pan-American coastline.

Originally described as a single species, genetic studies eventually classified it as at least four almost morphologically indistinguishable species, one of which was given the binomial denomination Callichirus macrotelsonis (Peiró, 2012). The complex is distinguished by sexual dimorphism, distinctly separated coxae and bases in the maxilla and gonochorism, despite vestigial signs of ancestral hermaphroditism in C. macrotelsonis.

The widespread extraction of individuals for living fishing bait has endangered both its conservation and that of their respective ecosystems.

== Taxonomy ==
Callichirus major was first described as Callianassa major by Thomas Say in 1818, specifically in the Gulf of Mexico and East Florida. Its genus was renamed Callichirus in 1866 by William Stimpson. It used to be classified in the infraorder Thalassinidea (ghost shrimp) of decapod crustaceans until this infraorder was proven to be paraphyletic in 2009, after which the family Callianassidae, in which C. major is included, was definitely placed in the infraorder Axiidae. A supposed Brazilian species described as Anomalocaris macrotelsonis Ortmann, 1893 was eventually discovered in 1974 to be the fourth larval stage of C. major.

In 1995, the results of genetic testing published by Staton and Felder concluded that Caribbean Colombian populations described as C. major could not belong to the same species as those found in the United States Atlantic Ocean. Among those in the United States, although there were minor morphological differences between the populations of the East Coast (from North Carolina to Georgia) and those of the Gulf of Mexico (from Louisiana to Texas), the overall internal diversity of each population made them genetically indistinguishable. Samples of Pacific Mexican ghost shrimps also later suggested a species not identical, but close to C. major s.s.

Further testing by Peiró confirmed that populations of the East Coast and the Gulf of Mexico belonged to the same species, which was in turn different from the Colombian ones, but C. major was definitely described not as only two, but four distinct species with a monophyletic origin. Apart from C. major stricto sensu in the United States, the Colombian populations were found to belong to a different species than those of Pacific Mexico and Costa Rica. Those were described simply as C. aff. major sp. 2 and C. aff. major sp. 1, still pending binomial naming. The Brazilian populations was designated as C. macrotelsonis. The relative genetical proximity between Caribbean and Pacific populations implies a separation posterior to the uplift of the Isthmus of Panama. Rio confirmed Peiró's tests at a morphological level, suggesting that the absolute lack of information on vestigial signs of hermaphroditism in C. major s.s. might indicate that this feature could be exclusive of the Brazilian species, which she denominated C. brasiliensis.

Based on descriptions by Sakai and Türkay in 2012, Felder and Dworschak suggested that the formers' denomination C. santarosaensis might be ascribed to populations formerly designated as C. major in the northern Gulf of Mexico, although pending further genetic analysis and casting doubt on the validity of Sakai's and Türkay's description of a damaged juvenile specimen, prejudicing the validity of the taxon.

== Description ==
The great morphological similarities between all species of the C. major complex has proven to be a difficulty for the distinction of its closely related species.

The C. major has a carapace with a rigid anterior margin, turning backwards to the linea thalassinica (an uncalcified membranous groove, in the complex's case distinctly parallel to the longitudinal axis of the body) and forwards to the rounded angles of the branchiostegal lung. The sternum is inconspicuous between the first and third pairs of pereopods. The complex has a flanked rostrum, with characteristically obtuse angles near the base of the eyestalks, which in turn almost reach the basal segment of the antennules' peduncles. The antennules have a third segments 1.5 to 2.5 times as longer as the first and second together.

The maxilla has distinctly separated coxae and bases. The first pair of pereopods is very unequal in size, especially in adult males, presenting a uniquely bold instance sexual dimorphism in the genus. The second pair is well chelated, but the fourth and fifth have rather imperfect chelae. The first and second segments of the abdomen are membranous and soft, the latter being longer than the first, and almost twice as long as the third, fourth and sixth segments. The third, fourth and sixth segments have approximately the same length, although the fifth is slightly longer than its adjacent segments.

Distinctly for its genus, C. major is gonochoristic. The vestigial signs of ancestral hermaphroditism (namely, the production of unused ovaries by males and additional gonopores in females) in C. macrotelsonis and the fully functional hermaphroditism in sister species such as C. seilacheri, however, implies that the genus Callichirus may have a unique case of crustacean basal, but not universal, hermaphroditism.

== Habitat ==
C. major s.l. occurs in open, dissipative and flat sandy beaches, mostly in deep galleries in the intertidal zone, but also in shallow subtidal depths of 2–3 m. It has a very large geographic distribution across Pan-American coastlines. In the Atlantic coastline, the distribution occurs from North Carolina to Santa Catarina, although with a large hiatus from Southern Texas to Pará, being therein only sporadically found in Colombia and Venezuela. In the Pacific coastline, the complex has been identified in both Baja California and Costa Rica.

C. major s.l. is widely employed as living fishing bait by many human coastal populations, including those in the United States and Brazil, due to its easy availability. Ghost shrimp mass extraction, both specifically regarding C. major and generically, has been described as ecologically harmful not only for their own ecological stability, but also to different animals that are killed in the procedure. The complex's IUCN status has been suggested as critically endangered, although it has not been officially reviewed by the IUCN.

== See also ==
- List of critically endangered arthropods
