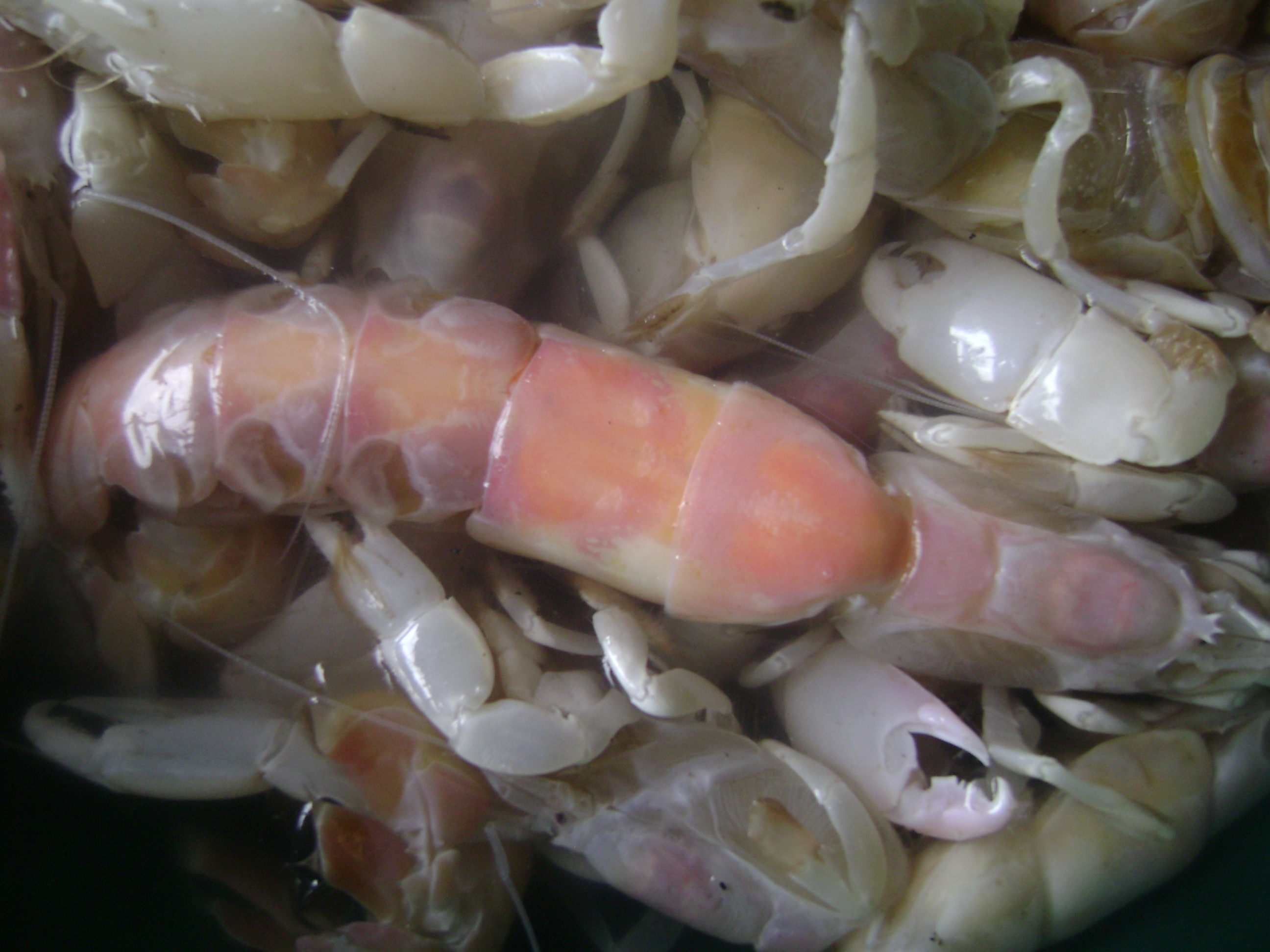

Scientific classification
- Kingdom: Animalia
- Phylum: Arthropoda
- Class: Malacostraca
- Order: Decapoda
- Suborder: Pleocyemata
- Family: Callichiridae
- Genus: Lepidophthalmus
- Species: L. turneranus

Binomial name
- Lepidophthalmus turneranus (White, 1861)

Synonyms
- Callianassa turnerana White, 1861; Callianassa krukenbergi Neumann, 1878; Callianassa diademata Ortmann, 1891; Callichirus turneranus (White, 1861)

= Lepidophthalmus turneranus =

Species of crustacean

Lepidophthalmus turneranus (formerly Callianassa turnerana), the Cameroon ghost shrimp, is a species of "ghost shrimp" or "mud lobster" that lives off the coast of West Africa. It occasionally erupts into dense swarms, one of which resulted in the naming of the country Cameroon.

== Distribution ==
Lepidophthalmus turneranus is found in lagoons and estuaries, including almost fresh water, around the Gulf of Guinea from Togo to Congo.

== Description ==
Adults reach a total length of 5.5–14.5 centimetres (2.2–5.7 in). The rostrum ends in three or five teeth, a feature shared with the Madagascan species L. grandidieri. In juveniles, the teeth may be missing. There is a sexual dimorphism in the form of the cheliped (claw-bearing appendage): females have a "deep crescent-shaped depression" near the base of the inside of the claw's fixed finger, while males lack this depression.

== Ecology and behaviour ==
Lepidophthalmus turneranus lives in burrows in mud. Every three to five years, vast swarms form in estuaries, and copulation occurs outside the burrow. When James Aspinall Turner presented the first specimens to the British Museum, he noted that:

... this long-bodied Crustacean appears periodically in the river in prodigious numbers, which disappear in the course of ten days or a fortnight. The natives are very fond of them, as they are delicious eating; and as soon as they make their appearance in the river, the men here leave their usual pursuits to catch them.

== Taxonomic history ==
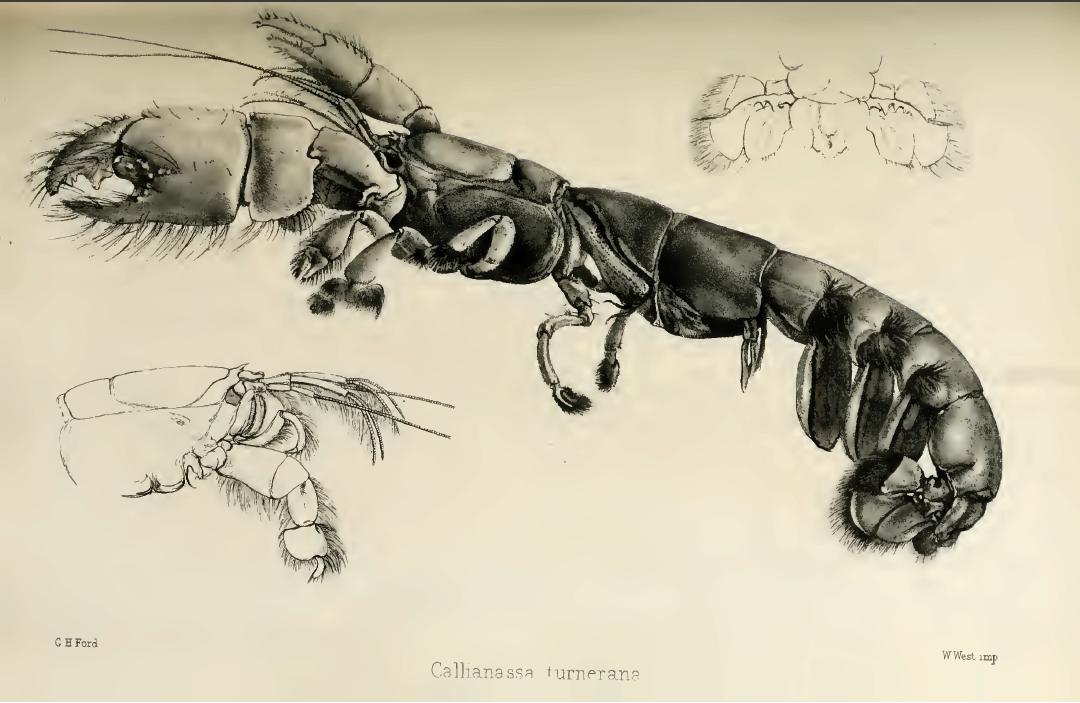
The illustration which accompanied White's description of the species

The Cameroon ghost shrimp was first described by Adam White in 1861, under the name Callianassa turnerana. That description was based on a specimen given by "the captain of an African trader" to James Aspinall Turner, who in turn presented it to the Zoology Department of the British Museum (now part of the Natural History Museum). The species was transferred to the genus Lepidophthalmus by K. Sakai in 1999.

== Cameroon ==
Lepidophthalmus turneranus is "probably the only crustacean ... for which a country is named". When the Portuguese explorers discovered the Wouri River in the 15th century, they witnessed a swarm of L. turneranus, and therefore named the river Rio dos Camarões ("river of the shrimp"). That name was anglicised to "Cameroons River", which came to be used for the whole country, and borrowed into other languages (including the French Cameroun, the German Kamerun and the Dutch Kameroen).
