= Calliapagurops charcoti =

Scientific classification
- Kingdom: Animalia
- Phylum: Arthropoda
- Clade: Pancrustacea
- Class: Malacostraca
- Order: Decapoda
- Suborder: Pleocyemata
- Family: Callichiridae
- Genus: Calliapagurops
- Species: C. charcoti

Binomial name
- Calliapagurops charcoti de Saint Laurent, 1973

Species of crustacean

Calliapagurops charcoti is a species of mud shrimp from Macaronesia. It is the only mud shrimp known from Madeira, and is the only species of mud shrimp thought to be a filter feeder.

== Description ==
Calliapagurops charcoti has a total length of around 77 millimetres (3.0 in), and a carapace length of 15–18 millimetres (0.6–0.7 in). Its body is white, sometimes with bands of reddish brown. The flagella of the antennae bear long setae (hairs). The animal spreads these like a fan, from the entrance to its burrow, and probably uses them for filter feeding. No other mud shrimp is known to be a filter feeder in this way.

== History and distribution ==
Calliapagurops charcoti was first found in 1973 off the coast of Flores in the Azores at a depth of 190–230 metres (620–750 ft). In 2010, it was found off the island of Madeira, at a depth of 20 m (66 ft), making it the only mud shrimp yet known from Madeira. This is one of the largest depth ranges of any mud shrimp. The only other species in the genus, C. foresti, was described from the Philippines in 2002.
