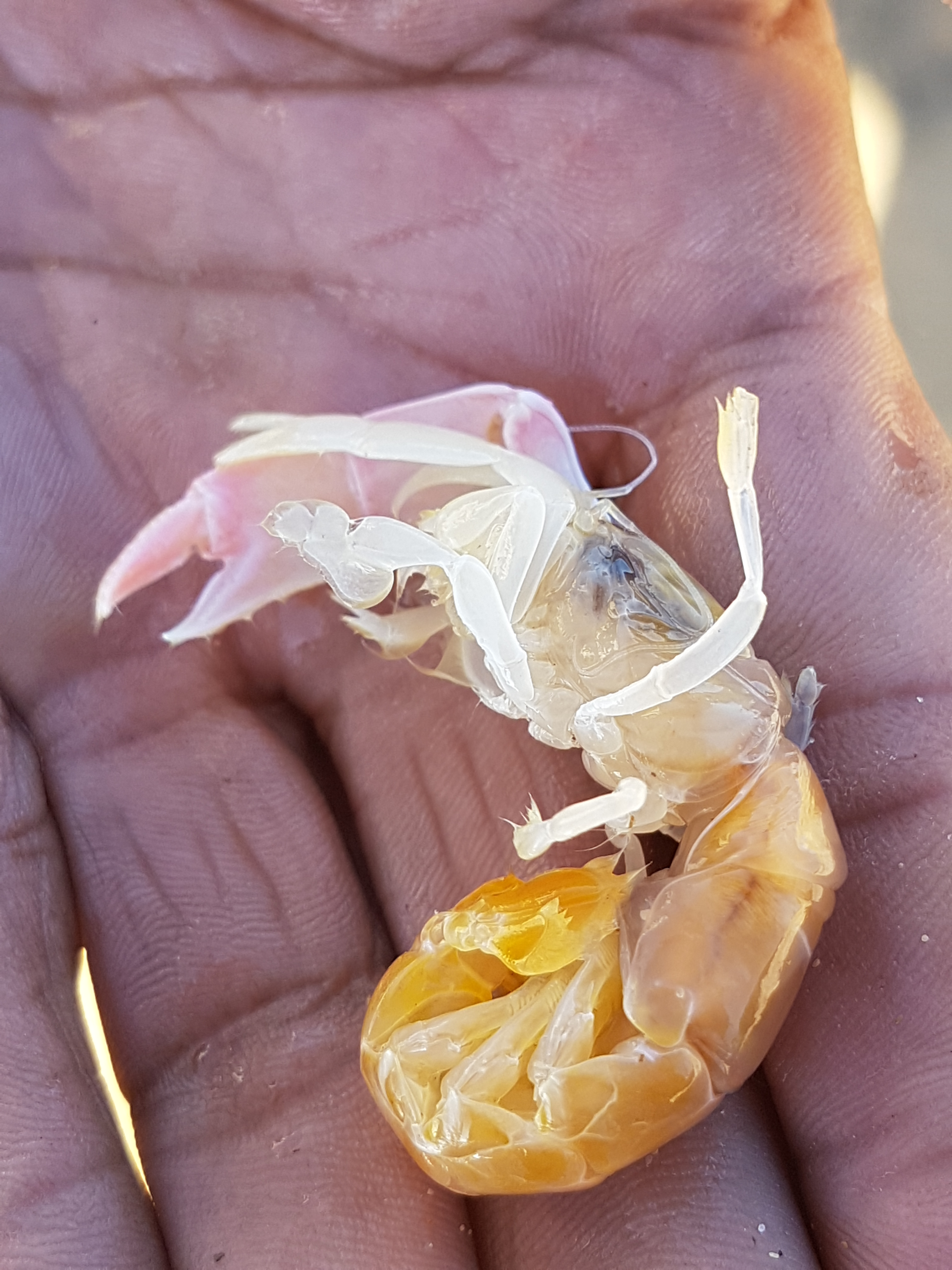

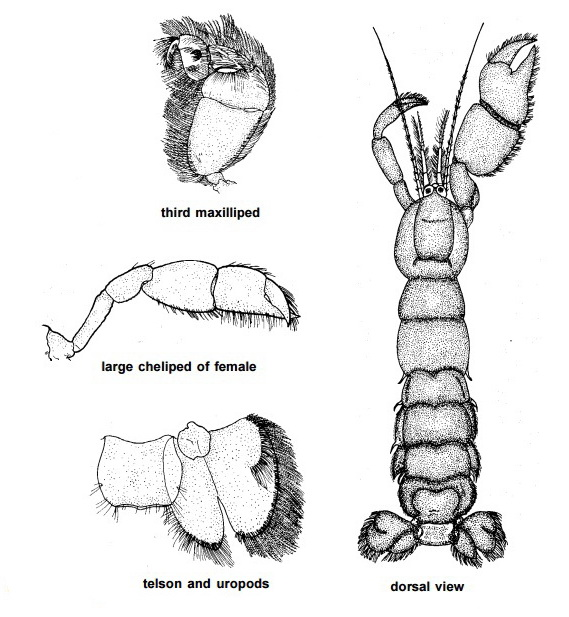
- Figure accompanying Stebbing's description

Scientific classification
- Kingdom: Animalia
- Phylum: Arthropoda
- Class: Malacostraca
- Order: Decapoda
- Suborder: Pleocyemata
- Family: Callichiridae
- Genus: Kraussillichirus
- Species: K. kraussi

Binomial name
- Kraussillichirus kraussi Stebbing, 1900

Synonyms
- Callianassa kraussi Stebbing, 1900; Callichirus kraussi Stebbing, 1900

= Kraussillichirus kraussi =

Species of crustacean

Kraussillichirus kraussi (Stebbing, 1900), commonly named the common sandprawn or pink prawn, is a species of ghost shrimp, an African crustacean in the family Callichiridae.

== Distribution and habitat ==
This species occurs along the coast and estuaries from Lambert's Bay in the Western Cape, around the Cape and northwards along the Indian Ocean coastline to Delagoa Bay in Mozambique. It is well-adapted to life both in the littoral zone of sheltered marine bays and of estuaries.

== Taxonomy ==
The common sandprawn was first described in the literature by the Rev. Thomas R. R. Stebbing, an ardent Darwinist who had been banned from preaching; the type specimen was collected at "Gordon's Bay, a little below high water mark", and placed in the genus Callianassa established by William Elford Leach in 1814. The species was subsequently moved to the genus Callichirus and, most recently, to the genus Kraussillichirus.

== Description ==
The original description reads:

"Rostrum broadly triangular, far overreached by the eyes that are oval. Antennal angle low and blunt, without spine. Antennular peduncle much longer than antennal peduncle, which it overreaches with more than half the length of the last segment. Third maxilliped with merus and ischium strongly widened to form an operculum. Carpus somewhat widened, being less than twice as long as wide; propodus strongly widened, being wider than long; dactylus slender. Large chela of adult male with a deep, but rather wide concavity in the anterior margin of the palm above the fixed finger. Carpus about as long as palm, and as long as high. Merus with a rounded lobe in basal part of lower margin. Surface of larger cheliped with numerous tubercles. Telson distinctly wider than long and much shorter than uropods, being only somewhat more than half as long as endopod. Lateral margins of telson convex, posterolateral corners rounded, posterior margin almost straight, without a spine. Endopod of uropod elongate oval."

— Stebbing 1900

== Ecology ==
Kraussillichirus kraussi plays an important role in the ecology of littoral zones by its bioturbation, which can alter sediment properties and thereby affect biofilms, microalgal and microbial levels, and meiobenthic and macrobenthic communities. Nutrients and bioturbation can also interact to shape macrofaunal communities. The distribution of these prawns is dictated by sediment properties which in turn are dependent on shore height and distance from the lagoon mouth. Collecting of the species as bait may reduce numbers significantly in some localities and disturb sedimentary environments.

A 2010 project in the Kasouga Estuary, on the south-eastern coast of South Africa, found that this species contributed significantly to bioturbation, leading to a decline in microphytobenthic algae which in turn caused a significant decrease in numbers of the gastropod Nassarius kraussianus. Another study in the Swartvlei estuary found that dense growth of the seagrass Zostera capensis and large numbers of burrowing bivalves led to a marked decrease in sandprawn numbers.

== Cryptic species ==
DNA sequence data indicate that Kraussillichirus kraussi comprises between four and six distinct evolutionary lineages that may represent morphologically indistinguishable sister species. Their ranges are linked to southern African marine biogeographical provinces or the biogeographical transition zones that separate them, with the tropical lineage on the north-east coast being the most distinct.
