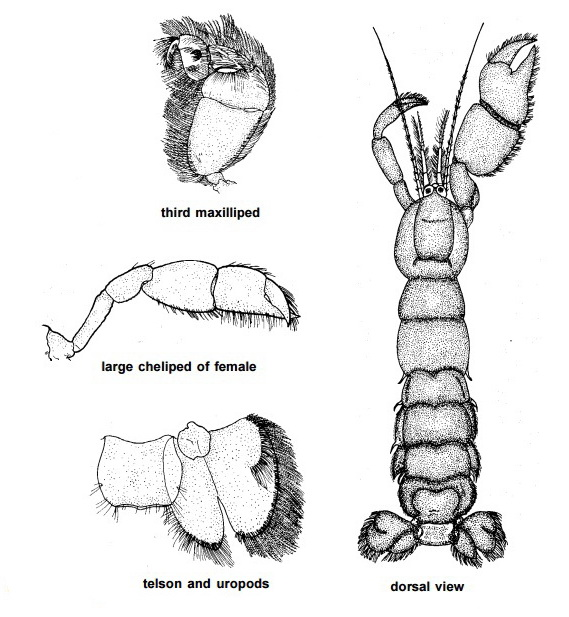
- Illustrations of C. kraussi

Scientific classification
- Domain: Eukaryota
- Kingdom: Animalia
- Phylum: Arthropoda
- Class: Malacostraca
- Order: Decapoda
- Suborder: Pleocyemata
- Family: Callianassidae
- Subfamily: Callichirinae
- Genus: Callichirus; Stimpson, 1866

Species
- See text

= Callichirus =

Genus of crustaceans

Callichirus is a genus of crustaceans belonging to the family Callianassidae. It was circumscribed by William Stimpson in 1866.

== Species ==
The genus includes the following species:

- Callichirus adamas (Kensley, 1974)
- Callichirus balssi (Monod, 1933)
- Callichirus foresti Le Loeuff & Intes, 1974
- Callichirus gilchristi (Barnard, 1947)
- Callichirus guineensis (de Man, 1928)
- Callichirus islagrande (Schmitt, 1935)
- Callichirus kraussi (Stebbing, 1900)
- Callichirus major (Say, 1818)
- Callichirus masoomi (Tirmizi, 1970)
- Callichirus santarosaensis Sakai & Türkay, 2012
- Callichirus seilacheri (Bott, 1955)
- Callichirus tenuimanus de Saint Laurent & Le Loeuff, 1979
