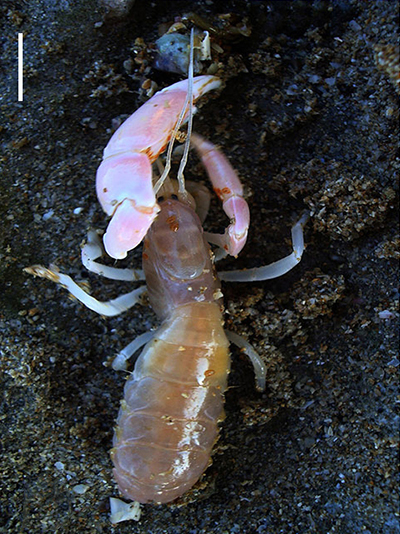
- Neocallichirus jousseaumei

Scientific classification
- Kingdom: Animalia
- Phylum: Arthropoda
- Class: Malacostraca
- Order: Decapoda
- Suborder: Pleocyemata
- Family: Callichiridae
- Genus: Neocallichirus; Sakai, 1988

= Neocallichirus =

Genus of crustaceans

Neocallichirus is a genus of ghost shrimp crustaceans belonging to the infraorder Axiidea, within the order Decapoda.

== Species ==
There are 34 species assigned to this genus of mud shrimp:

- Neocallichirus angelikae (Sakai, 2000)
- Neocallichirus auchenorhynchus (Sakai, 2005)
- Neocallichirus cacahuate (Felder & Manning, 1995)
- Neocallichirus calmani (Nobili, 1904)
- Neocallichirus darvishi (Sepahvand, Komai, Momtazi & Shahabi, 2018)
- Neocallichirus darwinensis (Sakai, 1988)
- Neocallichirus frouini (Ngoc-Ho, 2005)
- Neocallichirus grandimana (Gibbes, 1850)
- Neocallichirus guaiqueri (Blanco Rambla, Liñero Arana & Beltán Lares, 1995)
- Neocallichirus guara (Rodrigues, 1971)
- Neocallichirus guassutinga (Rodrigues, 1971)
- Neocallichirus horneri (Sakai, 1988)
- Neocallichirus jousseaumei (Nobili, 1904)
- Neocallichirus lemaitrei (Manning, 1993)
- Neocallichirus manningi (Kazmi & Kazmi, 1992)
- Neocallichirus maryae (Karasawa, 2004)
- Neocallichirus mauritianus (Miers, 1882)
- Neocallichirus mericeae (Manning & Felder, 1995)
- Neocallichirus moluccensis (De Man, 1905)
- Neocallichirus mortenseni (Sakai, 2005)
- Neocallichirus nagoi (Poore, 2023)
- Neocallichirus natalensis (Barnard, 1947)
- Neocallichirus nickellae (Manning, 1993)
- Neocallichirus pachydactylus (A. Milne-Edwards, 1870)
- Neocallichirus pinheiroi (Hernáez, Windsor, Paula & Santana, 2020)
- Neocallichirus pola (Sakai & Türkay, 2014)
- Neocallichirus raymanningi (Blanco Rambla & Lemaitre, 1999)
- Neocallichirus sassandrensis ((Le Loeuff & Intes, 1974)
- Neocallichirus spiridonovi (Sakai, 2010)
- Neocallichirus sulfureus (Lemaitre & Felder, 1996)
- Neocallichirus taiaro (Ngoc-Ho, 1995)
- Neocallichirus variabilis (Edmondson, 1944)
- Neocallichirus vaugelasi (Dworschak, 2011)
- Neocallichirus vigilax (De Man, 1916)
