= Calliapagurops =

Scientific classification
- Kingdom: Animalia
- Phylum: Arthropoda
- Clade: Pancrustacea
- Class: Malacostraca
- Order: Decapoda
- Suborder: Pleocyemata
- Family: Callichiridae
- Subfamily: Calliapaguropinae; Sakai, 1999
- Genus: Calliapagurops de Saint Laurent, 1973

Genus of crustaceans

Calliapagurops is a genus of mud shrimp containing two species:

- Calliapagurops charcoti de Saint Laurent, 1973 – Azores, Madeira
- Calliapagurops foresti Ngoc-Ho, 2002 – Philippines
