= Glypturus =

Scientific classification
- Kingdom: Animalia
- Phylum: Arthropoda
- Class: Malacostraca
- Order: Decapoda
- Suborder: Pleocyemata
- Family: Callichiridae
- Genus: Glypturus; Stimpson, 1866

Species
- See text

Genus of crustaceans

Glypturus is a genus of crustaceans belonging to the family Callichiridae.: It was circumscribed by William Stimpson in 1866.

== Species ==
The genus includes the following species

- Glypturus acanthochirus Stimpson, 1866
- Glypturus armatus (A. Milne-Edwards, 1870)
- Glypturus ferox Sato, Komai & Shimizu, 2024
- Glypturus laurae (de Saint Laurent in de Vaugelas & de Saint Laurent, 1984)
- Glypturus rabalaisae Sakai, 2011
