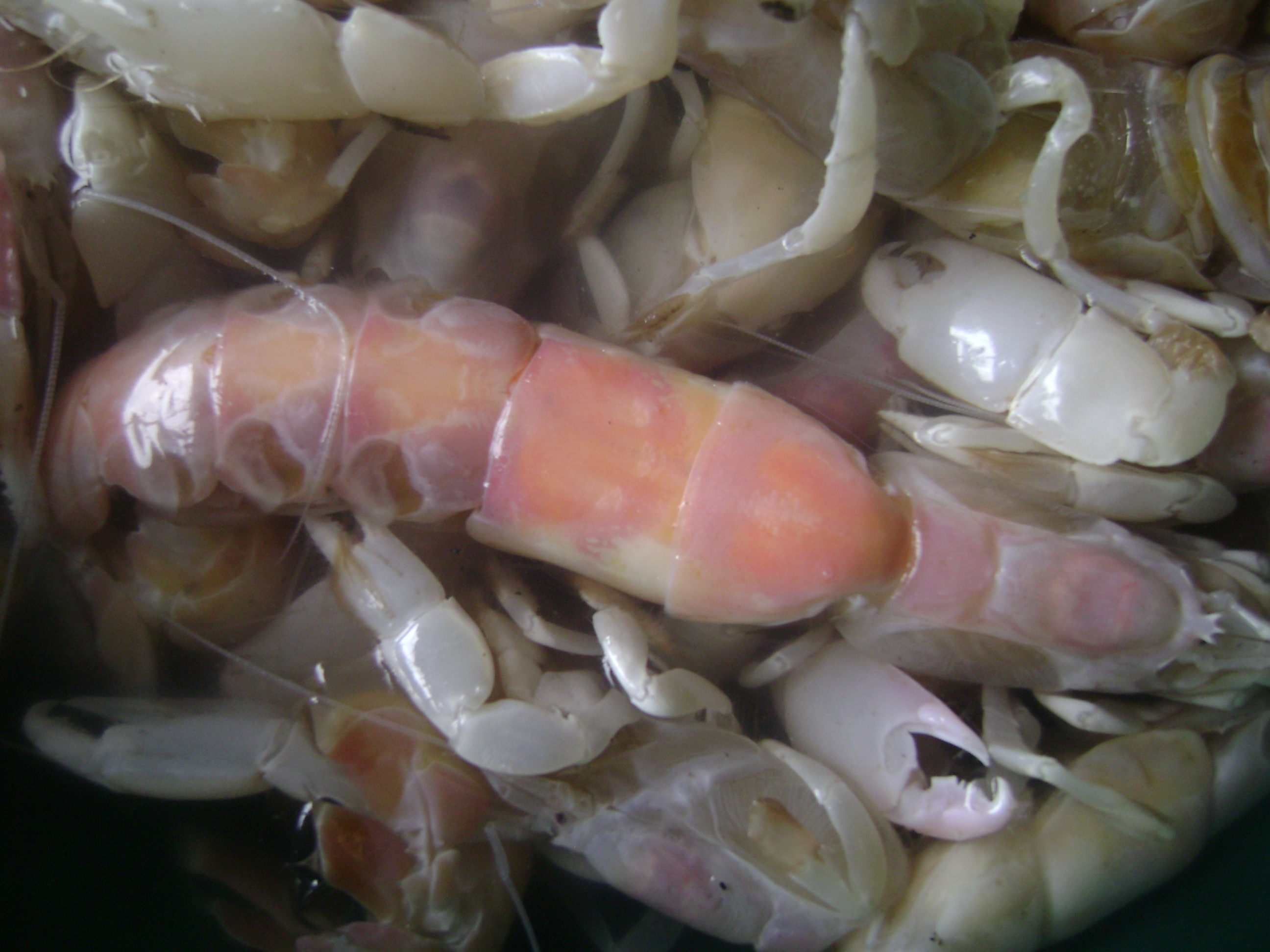
- Lepidophthalmus turneranus

Scientific classification
- Domain: Eukaryota
- Kingdom: Animalia
- Phylum: Arthropoda
- Class: Malacostraca
- Order: Decapoda
- Suborder: Pleocyemata
- Family: Callichiridae
- Genus: Lepidophthalmus; Holmes, 1904

Type species
- Lepidophthalmus eiseni Holmes, 1904

= Lepidophthalmus =

Genus of crustaceans

Lepidophthalmus is a genus of crustaceans.

== Species ==
Lepidophthalmus contains the following species:

- Lepidophthalmus bocourti (A. Milne-Edwards, 1870)
- Lepidophthalmus eiseni Holmes, 1904
- Lepidophthalmus grandidieri (Coutière, 1899)
- Lepidophthalmus jamaicense (Schmitt, 1935)
- Lepidophthalmus louisianensis (Schmitt, 1935)
- Lepidophthalmus manningi Feder & Staton, 2000
- Lepidophthalmus rafai Felder & Manning, 1998
- Lepidophthalmus richardi Felder & Manning, 1997
- Lepidophthalmus rosae (Nobili, 1904)
- Lepidophthalmus sinuensis Lemaitre & Rodrigues, 1991
- Lepidophthalmus siriboia Felder & Rodrigues, 1993
- Lepidophthalmus socotrensis Sakai & Apel, 2002
- Lepidophthalmus tridentatus (Von Martens, 1868)
- Lepidophthalmus turneranus (White, 1861)

Only one species is known from the fossil record: Remains attributable to the extant species Lepidophthalmus jamaicense have been found in Upper Pleistocene deposits at Port Morant Harbour in the parish of St. Thomas, Jamaica.
