= Corallianassa =

Scientific classification
- Kingdom: Animalia
- Phylum: Arthropoda
- Class: Malacostraca
- Order: Decapoda
- Suborder: Pleocyemata
- Family: Callichiridae
- Genus: Corallianassa; Manning, 1987

Species
- See text

Genus of crustaceans

Corallianassa is a genus of crustaceans belonging to the family Callichiridae.

== Species ==
The genus includes the following species:

- Corallianassa assimilis (De Man, 1928)
- Corallianassa borradailei (De Man, 1928)
- Corallianassa coutierei (Nobili, 1904)
- Corallianassa hartmeyeri (Schmitt, 1935)
- Corallianassa intesi (de Saint Laurent & Le Loeuff, 1979)
- Corallianassa lanceolata (Edmondson, 1944)
- Corallianassa longiventris (A. Milne-Edwards, 1870)
- Corallianassa martensi (Miers, 1884)
- Corallianassa oahuensis (Edmondson, 1944)
- Corallianassa xutha Manning, 1988
