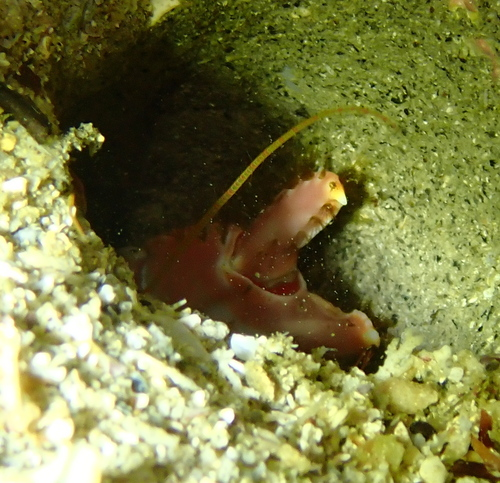

Scientific classification
- Kingdom: Animalia
- Phylum: Arthropoda
- Clade: Pancrustacea
- Class: Malacostraca
- Order: Decapoda
- Suborder: Pleocyemata
- Family: Callichiridae
- Genus: Articullichirus; Poore, Dworschak & Schnabel, 2022

Species
- See text

= Articullichirus =

Genus of crustaceans

Articullichirus is a genus of crustaceans belonging to the family Callichiridae.

== Species ==
The genus includes the following species:

- Articullichirus articulatus (Rathbun, 1906)
- Articullichirus chiltoni Poore, Dworschak & Schnabel, 2022
- Articullichirus collaroy (Poore & Griffin, 1979)
