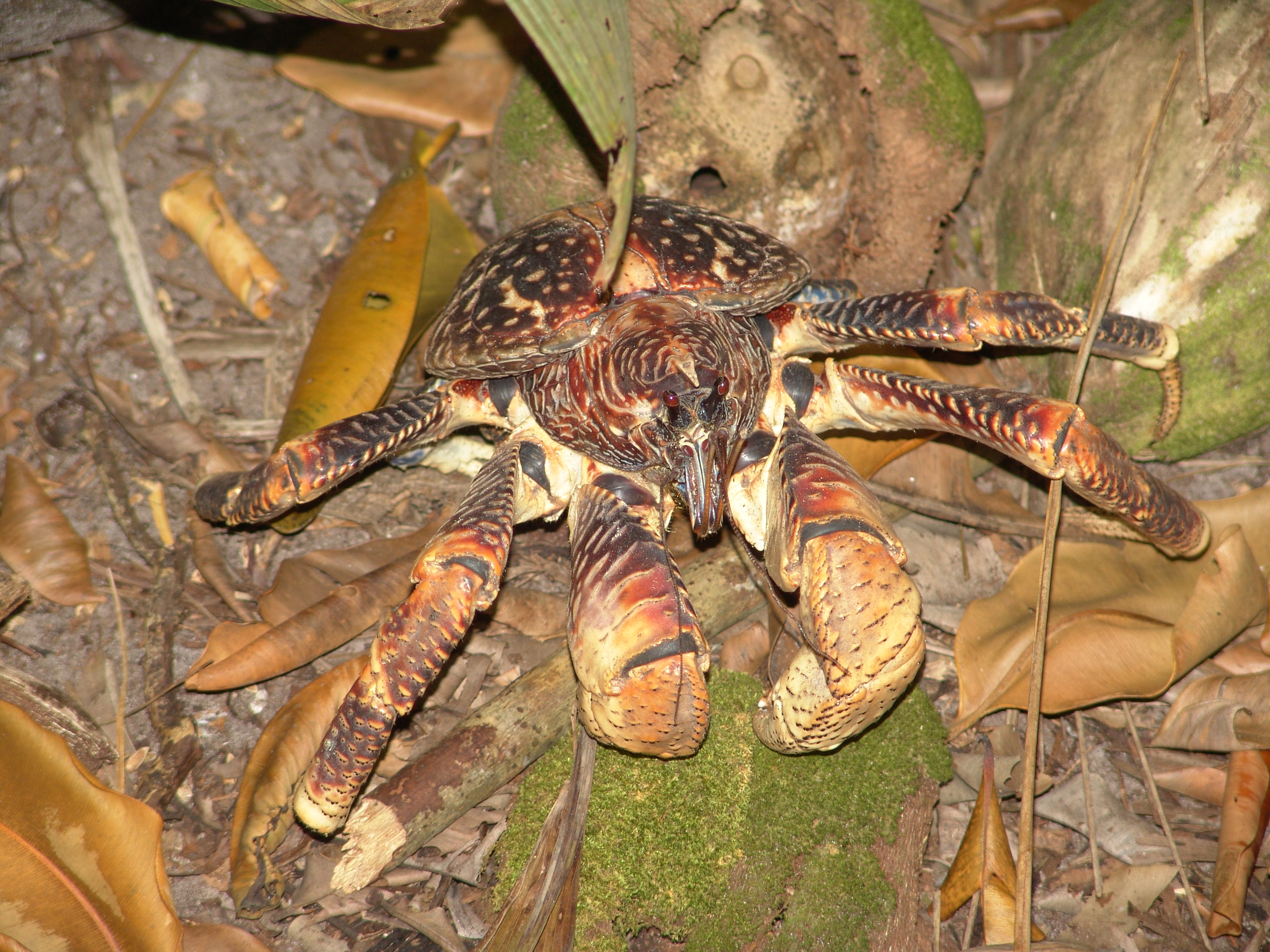

Conservation status
- Vulnerable (IUCN 3.1)

Scientific classification
- Kingdom: Animalia
- Phylum: Arthropoda
- Clade: Pancrustacea
- Class: Malacostraca
- Order: Decapoda
- Suborder: Pleocyemata
- Infraorder: Anomura
- Family: Coenobitidae
- Genus: Birgus; Leach, 1816
- Species: B. latro

Binomial name
- Birgus latro (Linnaeus, 1767)
- Coconut crabs live on most coasts in the blue area; red points are primary and yellow points secondary places of settlement

Synonyms
- Cancer crumenatus Rumphius, 1705 (pre-Linnean); Cancer crumenatus orientalis Seba, 1759; Cancer latro Linnaeus, 1767; Birgus laticauda Latreille, 1829

= Coconut crab =

Species of crustacean

The coconut crab (Birgus latro) is a terrestrial species of giant hermit crab, and is also known as the robber crab or palm thief. It is the largest living terrestrial arthropod, with a weight up to 4.1 kg (9.0 lb). The distance from the tip of one leg to the tip of another can be as wide as 90 cm (35 in). It is found on islands across the Indian and Pacific Oceans, as far east as the Gambier Islands, Pitcairn Islands, and Caroline Island, and as far west as Zanzibar. While its range broadly shadows the distribution of the coconut palm, the coconut crab has been extirpated from most areas with a significant human population such as mainland Australia and Madagascar.

The coconut crab is the only species of the genus Birgus, and is related to the other terrestrial hermit crabs of the genus Coenobita. It shows a number of adaptations to life on land. Juvenile coconut crabs use empty gastropod shells for protection like other hermit crabs, but the adults develop a tough exoskeleton on their abdomens and stop carrying a shell. Coconut crabs have organs known as branchiostegal lungs, which they use for breathing instead of their vestigial gills. After the juvenile stage, they will drown if immersed in water for too long. They have an acute sense of smell, which they use to find potential food sources, and which has developed convergently with that of insects.

Adult coconut crabs feed primarily on fleshy fruits, nuts, seeds, and the pith of fallen trees, but they eat carrion and other organic matter opportunistically. Anything left unattended on the ground is a potential source of food, which they will investigate and may carry away – thereby getting the alternative name of "robber crab". Despite its name, coconuts are not a significant part of the crab's diet. Although it lives in a burrow, the crab has been filmed climbing coconut and pandanus trees. The crab has never been filmed selectively picking coconut fruit, though they might dislodge ripe fruit that otherwise would fall naturally. When a crab is not near its burrow, climbing is an immediate escape route from predators. Sea birds eat young crabs, and both humans and larger, older crabs eat crabs of all ages.

Mating occurs on dry land, but the females return to the edge of the sea to release their fertilized eggs, and then retreat up the beach. The larvae that hatch are planktonic for 3–4 weeks, before settling to the sea floor, entering a gastropod shell and returning to dry land. Sexual maturity is reached after about 5 years, and the total lifespan may be over 60 years. In the 3–4 weeks that the larvae remain at sea, their chances of reaching another suitable location are enhanced if a floating life-support system avails itself to them. Examples of the systems that provide such opportunities include floating logs and rafts of marine or terrestrial vegetation. Similarly, floating coconuts can be a very significant part of the crab's dispersal options. Fossils of this crab date back to the Miocene.

== Taxonomy ==
The coconut crab has been known to western scientists since the voyages of Francis Drake around 1580 and William Dampier around 1688. Based on an account by Georg Eberhard Rumphius (1705), who had called the animal "Cancer crumenatus", Carl Linnaeus (1767) named the species Cancer latro, from the Latin latro, meaning "robber". The genus Birgus was erected in 1816 by William Elford Leach, containing only Linnaeus' Cancer latro, which was thus renamed Birgus latro.

Birgus is classified in the family Coenobitidae, alongside one other genus, Coenobita, which contains terrestrial hermit crabs.

Common names for the species include coconut crab, robber crab, and palm thief, which mirrors the animal's name in other European languages (e.g. German: Palmendieb). In Japan (where the species lives on some of the country's southerly island chains), the species is typically referred to as yashigani (ヤシガニ), meaning 'palm crab'.

== Description ==
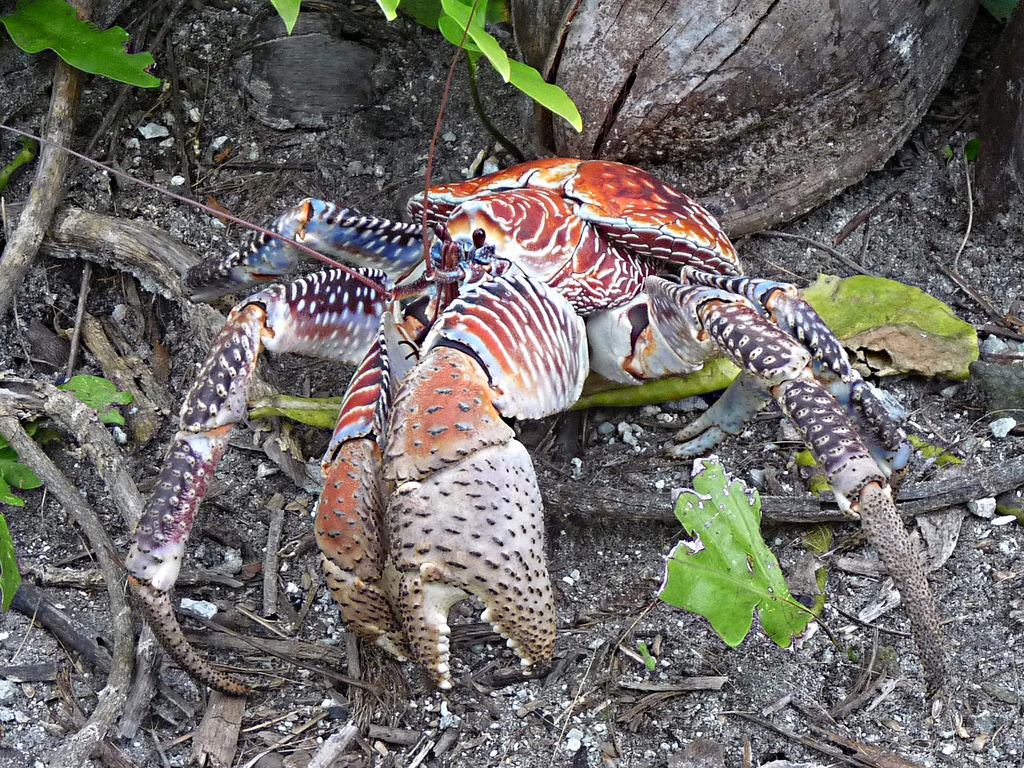
Coconut crab on Palmyra Atoll

B. latro is both the largest living terrestrial arthropod and the largest living terrestrial invertebrate. Reports of its size vary, but most sources give a body length up to 40 cm (16 in), a weight up to 4.1 kg (9 lb), and a leg span more than 0.91 m (3 ft), with males generally being larger than females. The carapace may reach a length of 78 mm (3 1/16 in), and a width up to 200 mm (8 in).

The body of the coconut crab, like those of all decapods, is divided into a front section (cephalothorax) with 10 legs, and an abdomen. The front-most pair of legs has large chelae (claws), with the left being larger than the right. The next two pairs of legs, as with other hermit crabs, are large, powerful, walking legs with pointed tips that allow coconut crabs to climb vertical or even overhanging surfaces. The fourth pair of legs is smaller, with tweezer-like chelae at the end allowing young coconut crabs to grip the inside of the shell or coconut husks that juveniles habitually carry for protection. Adults use this pair for walking and climbing. The last pair of legs is very small and is used by females to tend their eggs and by the males in mating. This last pair of legs is usually held in the cavity containing the breathing organs, inside the carapace. Some difference in color occurs between individuals found on different islands, ranging from orange-red to purplish blue. In most regions, blue is the predominant color, but in some places such as the Seychelles, most individuals are red.

Although B. latro is a derived type of hermit crab, only juveniles use salvaged snail shells to protect their soft abdomens, while adolescents sometimes use broken coconut shells for the same purpose. Unlike other hermit crabs, the adult coconut crabs do not carry shells, but instead harden their abdominal terga by depositing chitin and calcium carbonate. Absent the physical constraint of living within another creature's shell, B. latro grows much larger than its relatives in the family Coenobitidae. Despite being the product of carcinization, like most true crabs B. latro bends its tail beneath its body for protection.

The hardened abdomen protects the coconut crab and reduces water loss on land, but must be periodically moulted. Adults moult annually, digging a burrow up to 1 m (3 ft 3 in) long in which to hide while their soft shell hardens. Depending on the size of the individual, 1–3 weeks are needed for the exoskeleton to harden. The animals remain in this burrow for 3–16 weeks, again depending on size.

=== Respiration ===
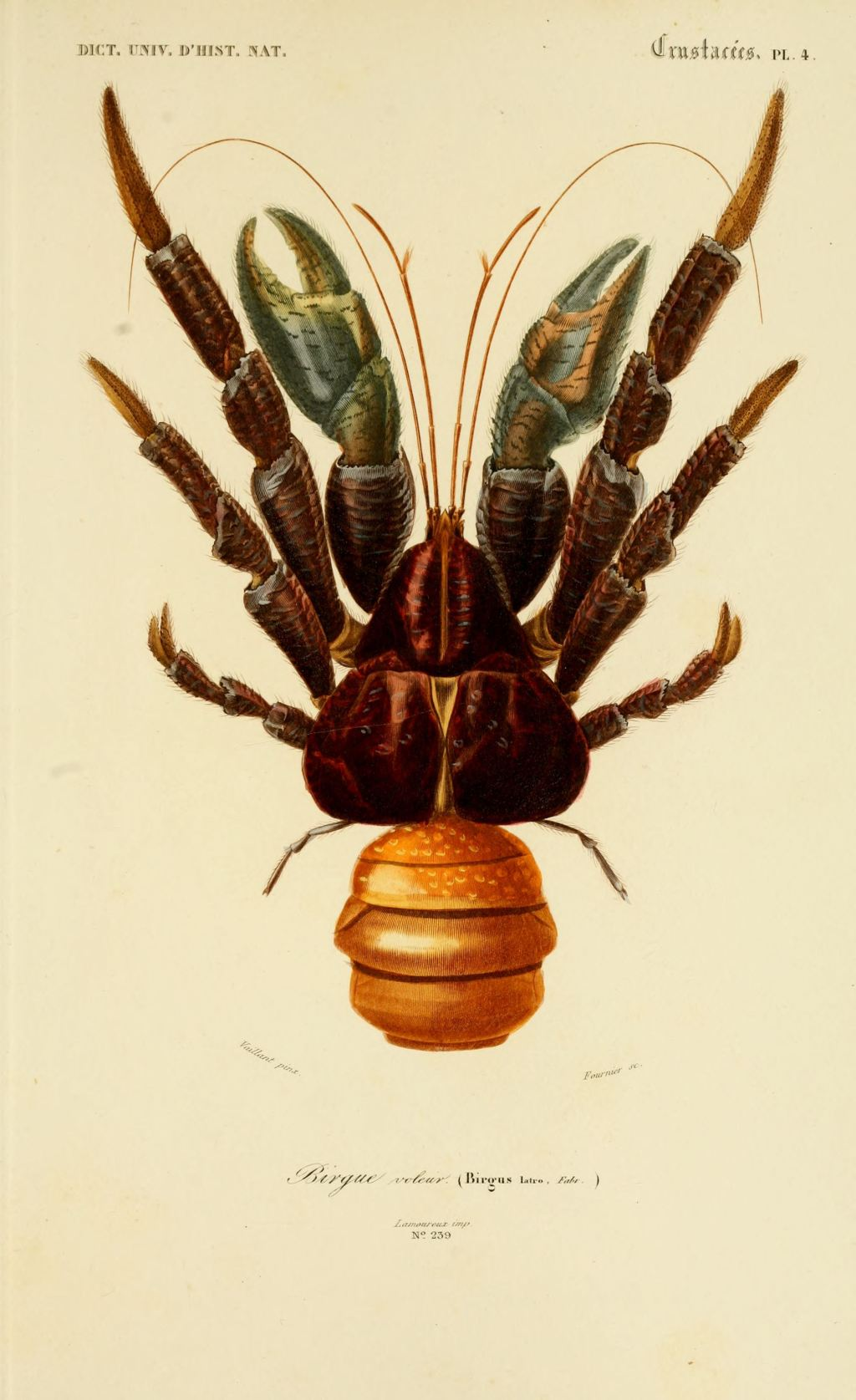
Print of a coconut crab from the Dictionnaire d'Histoire Naturelle of 1849

Except as larvae, coconut crabs cannot swim, and they drown if left in water for more than an hour. They use a special organ called a branchiostegal lung to breathe. This organ can be interpreted as a developmental stage between gills and lungs, and is one of the most significant adaptations of the coconut crab to its habitat. The branchiostegal lung contains a tissue similar to that found in gills, but suited to the absorption of oxygen from air, rather than water. This organ is expanded laterally and is evaginated to increase the surface area; located in the cephalothorax, it is optimally placed to reduce both the blood/gas diffusion distance and the return distance of oxygenated blood to the pericardium.

Coconut crabs use their hindmost, smallest pair of legs to clean these breathing organs and to moisten them with water. The organs require water to properly function, and the coconut crab provides this by stroking its wet legs over the spongy tissues nearby. Coconut crabs may drink water from small puddles by transferring it from their chelipeds to their maxillipeds.

In addition to the branchiostegal lung, the coconut crab has an additional rudimentary set of gills. Although these gills are comparable in number to aquatic species from the families Paguridae and Diogenidae, they are reduced in size and have comparatively less surface area.

=== Sense of smell ===
The coconut crab has a well-developed sense of smell, which it uses to locate its food. The process of smelling works very differently depending on whether the smelled molecules are hydrophilic molecules in water or hydrophobic molecules in air. Crabs that live in water have specialized organs called aesthetascs on their antennae to determine both the intensity and the direction of a scent. Coconut crabs live on the land, so the aesthetascs on their antennae are shorter and blunter than those of other crabs and are more similar to those of insects.

While insects and the coconut crab originate from different clades, the same need to track smells in the air led to convergent evolution of similar organs. Coconut crabs flick their antennae as insects do to enhance their reception. Their sense of smell can detect interesting odors over large distances. The smells of rotting meat, bananas, and coconuts, all potential food sources, especially catch their attention. The olfactory system in the coconut crab's brain is well-developed compared to other areas of the brain.

== Life cycle ==
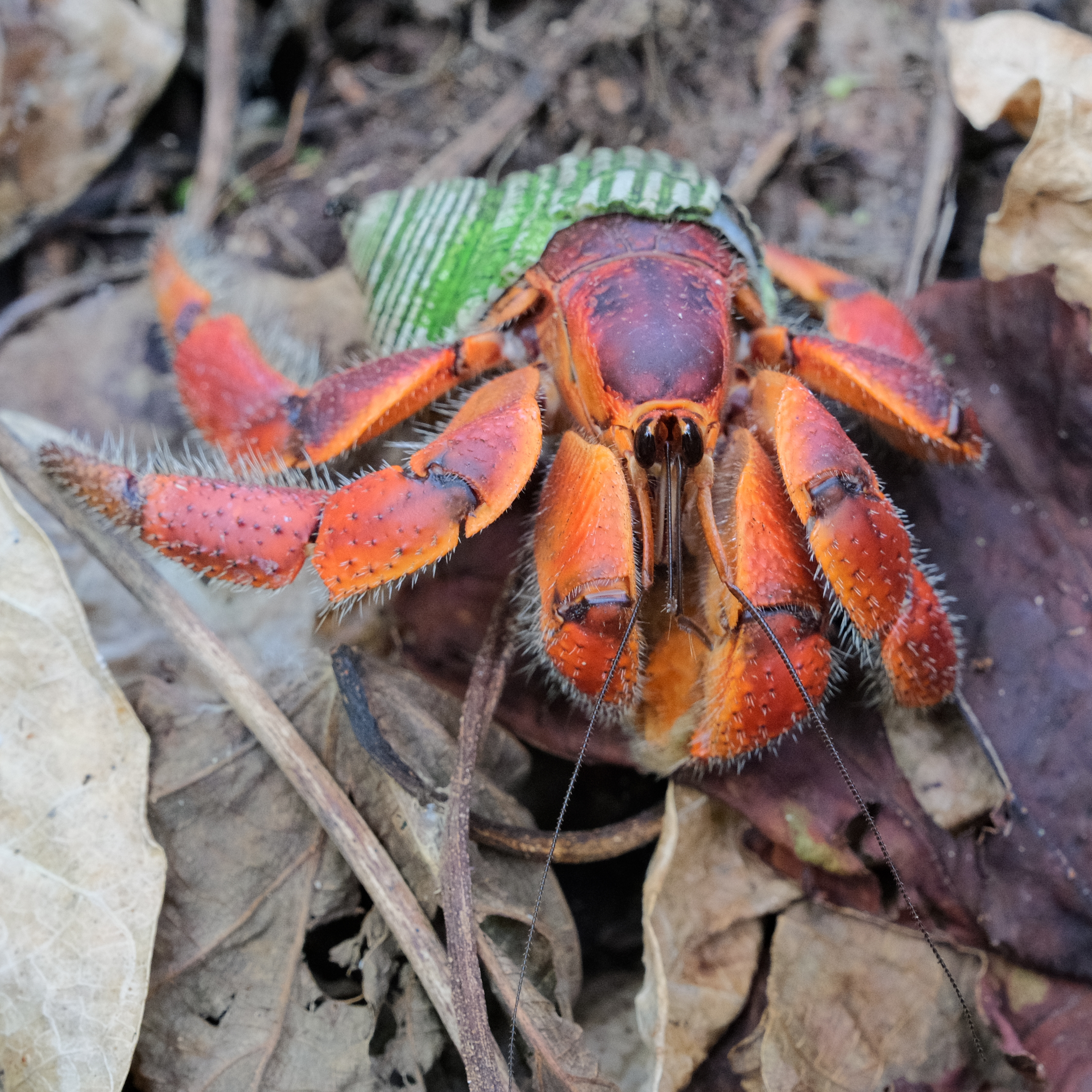
A juvenile coconut crab using a shell as shelter

Coconut crabs mate frequently and quickly on dry land in the period from May to September, especially between early June and late August. Males have spermatophores and deposit a mass of spermatophores on the abdomens of females; the oviducts opens at the base of the third pereiopods, and fertilisation is thought to occur on the external surface of the abdomen, as the eggs pass through the spermatophore mass.

The extrusion of eggs occurs on land in crevices or burrows near the shore. The female lays her eggs shortly after mating, and glues them to the underside of her abdomen, carrying the fertilised eggs underneath her body for a few months. At the time of hatching, the female coconut crab migrates to the seashore and releases the larvae into the ocean. The coconut crab takes a large risk while laying the eggs, because it cannot swim. If a coconut crab falls into the water or is swept away, its weight makes swimming back to dry land difficult or impossible. The egg-laying usually takes place on rocky shores at dusk, especially when this coincides with high tide. The empty egg cases remain on the female's body after the larvae have been released, and the female eats them within a few days.

The larvae float in the pelagic zone of the ocean with other plankton for 3–4 weeks, during which a large number of them are eaten by predators. The larvae pass through three to five zoea stages before moulting into the postlarval glaucothoe stage; this process takes from 25 to 33 days.

Upon reaching the glaucothoe stage of development, they settle to the bottom, find and wear a suitably sized gastropod shell, and migrate to the shoreline with other terrestrial hermit crabs. At that time, they sometimes visit dry land. Afterwards, they leave the ocean permanently and lose the ability to breathe in water. As with all hermit crabs, they change their shells as they grow. Young coconut crabs that cannot find a seashell of the right size often use broken coconut pieces. When they outgrow their shells, they develop a hardened abdomen. The coconut crab reaches sexual maturity around 5 years after hatching. They reach their maximum size only after 40–60 years. They grow remarkably slowly, and may take up to 120 years to reach full size, as posited by Michelle Drew of the Max Planck Institute.

== Distribution ==
Coconut crabs live in the Indian and the central Pacific Ocean, with a distribution that closely matches that of the coconut palm. The western limit of the range of B. latro is Zanzibar, off the coast of Tanzania, while the tropics of Cancer and Capricorn mark the northern and southern limits, respectively, with very few populations in the subtropics, such as the Ryukyu Islands. Some evidence indicates the coconut crab once lived on the mainland of Australia, Madagascar, Rodrigues, Easter Island, Tokelau, the Marquesas Islands, and possibly India, but is now extirpated in those areas. As they cannot swim as adults, coconut crabs must have colonised the islands as planktonic larvae.

Christmas Island in the Indian Ocean has the largest and densest population of coconut crabs in the world, although it is outnumbered there by more than 50 times by the Christmas Island red crab (Gecarcoidea natalis). Other Indian Ocean populations exist on the Seychelles, including Aldabra and Cosmoledo, but the coconut crab is extinct on the central islands. They occur on several of the Andaman and Nicobar Islands in the Bay of Bengal. They occur on most of the islands, and the northern atolls, of the Chagos Archipelago.

In the Pacific, the coconut crab's range became known gradually. Charles Darwin assumed it was only found on "a single coral island north of the Society group". The coconut crab is far more widespread, though it is not abundant on every Pacific island it inhabits. Large populations exist on the Cook Islands, especially Pukapuka, Suwarrow, Mangaia, Takutea, Mauke, Atiu, and Palmerston Island. These are close to the eastern limit of its range, as are the Line Islands of Kiribati, where the coconut crab is especially frequent on Teraina (Washington Island), with its abundant coconut palm forest. The Gambier Islands mark the species' eastern limit.

== Ecology ==
=== Diet ===
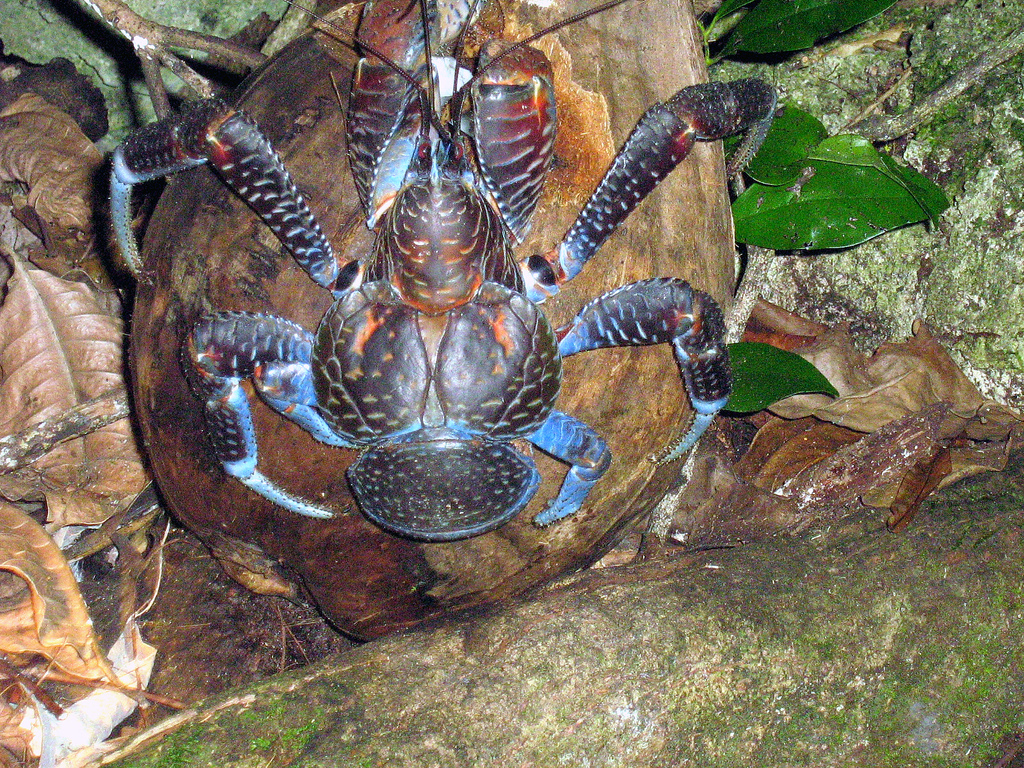
A coconut crab atop a coconut

The diet of coconut crabs consists primarily of fleshy fruits (particularly Ochrosia ackeringae, Arenga listeri, Pandanus elatus, P. christmatensis); nuts (Aleurites moluccanus), drupes (Cocos nucifera) and seeds (Annona reticulata); and the pith of fallen trees. As they are omnivores, though, they consume other organic materials, such as tortoise hatchlings and dead animals, including other crustaceans, as well as the molted exoskeletons of other crustaceans. They have been observed to prey upon crabs such as Gecarcoidea natalis and Discoplax hirtipes, and scavenge on the carcasses of other coconut crabs. During a tagging experiment, one coconut crab was observed killing and eating a Polynesian rat (Rattus exulans). In 2016, a large coconut crab was observed climbing a tree to disable and consume a red-footed booby on the Chagos Archipelago.

The coconut crab can take a coconut from the ground and cut it to a husk nut, take it with its claw, climb up a tree 10 m (33 ft) high and drop the husk nut, to access the coconut flesh inside. They often descend from the trees by falling, and can survive a fall of at least 4.5 m (15 ft) unhurt. Coconut crabs cut holes into coconuts with their strong claws and eat the contents, although several days may be needed before the coconut is opened.

Thomas Hale Streets discussed the behaviour in 1877, doubting that the animal would climb trees to get at the coconuts. As late as the 1970s, doubts remained about the crab's ability to open coconuts. In the 1980s, Holger Rumpf was able to confirm Streets' report, observing and studying how they open coconuts in the wild. The animal has developed a special technique to do so; if the coconut is still covered with husk, it uses its claws to rip off strips, always starting from the side with the three germination pores, the group of three small circles found on the outside of the coconut. Once the pores are visible, the coconut crab bangs its pincers on one of them until it breaks. Afterwards, it turns around and uses the smaller pincers on its other legs to pull out the white flesh of the coconut. Using their strong claws, larger individuals can even break the hard coconut into smaller pieces for easier consumption.

=== Habitat ===
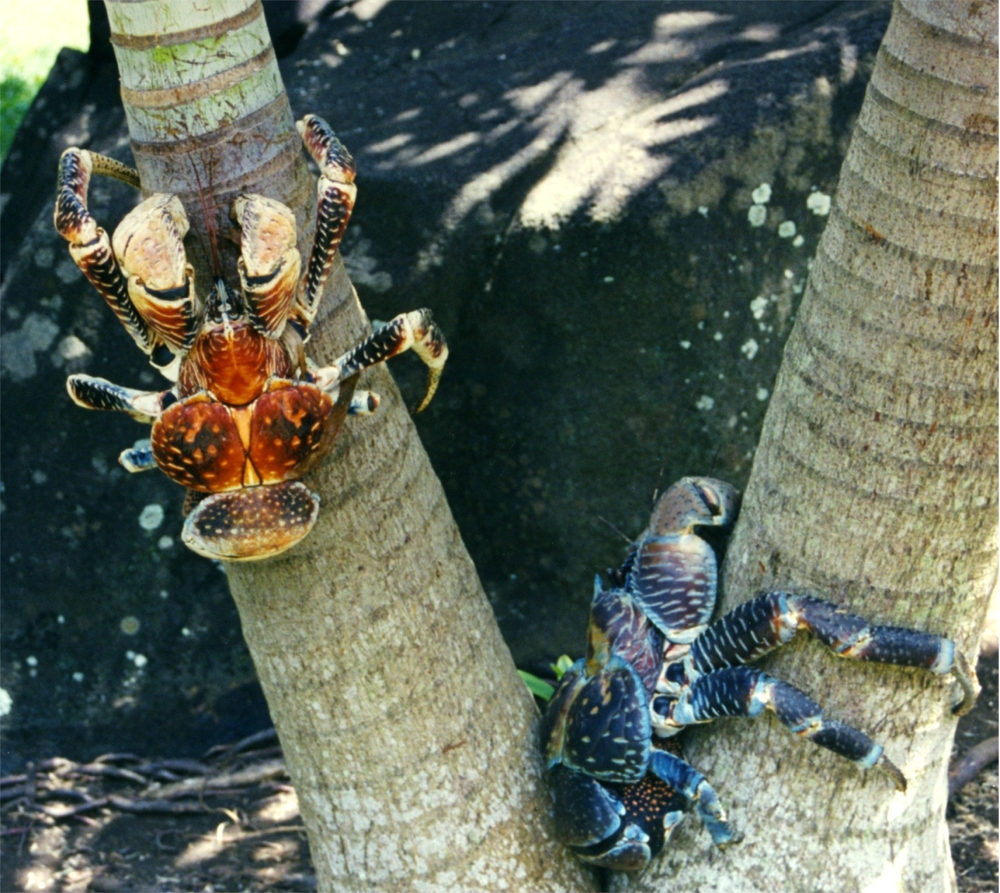
Coconut crabs vary in size and coloring.

Coconut crabs are considered one of the most terrestrial-adapted of the decapods, with most aspects of its life oriented to, and centered around, such an existence; they actually will drown in sea water in less than a day. Coconut crabs live alone in burrows and rock crevices, depending on the local terrain. They dig their own burrows in sand or loose soil. During the day, they stay hidden to reduce water loss from heat. The coconut crabs' burrows contain very fine yet strong fibres of the coconut husk, which the animal uses as bedding. While resting in its burrow, the coconut crab closes the entrances with one of its claws to create the moist microclimate within the burrow, which is necessary for the functioning of its breathing organs. In areas with large coconut crab populations, some may come out during the day, perhaps to gain an advantage in the search for food. Other times, they emerge if the weather is humid or raining, since these conditions allow them to breathe more easily. They live almost exclusively on land, returning to the sea only to release their eggs; on Christmas Island, for instance, B. latro is abundant 6 km (3 1/2 mi) from the sea.

== Relationship with humans ==
Adult coconut crabs have no known predators apart from other coconut crabs and humans. Their large size and the quality of their meat means that they are extensively hunted and are very rare on islands with a human population. The coconut crab is eaten as a delicacy – and regarded as an aphrodisiac – on various islands, and intensive hunting has threatened the species' survival in some areas. In other regions, taboos associated with the crab prohibit or limit hunting and consumption of B. latro. Such taboos have been recorded in the Nicobar Islands in India, on Flores Island in Indonesia, and among the Tao people of Taiwan. On the Nicobarian Kamorta Island, eating the crab is believed to lead to bad luck and to cause severe, sometimes fatal, illnesses. In cases where locals fall ill after consuming the crab, their families create a wooden image of the creature. This effigy is then taken to the crab's capture site, where specific rituals are performed.

While the coconut crab itself is not innately poisonous, it may become so depending on its diet, and cases of coconut crab poisoning have occurred. For instance, consumption of the sea mango (Cerbera manghas) by the coconut crab may make the coconut crab toxic due to the presence of cardiac cardenolides.

The pincers of the coconut crab are powerful enough to cause noticeable pain to a human; furthermore, the coconut crab often keeps its hold for extended periods of time. Thomas Hale Streets reports a trick used by Micronesians of the Line Islands to get a coconut crab to loosen its grip: "It may be interesting to know that in such a dilemma a gentle titillation of the under soft parts of the body with any light material will cause the crab to loosen its hold."

In the Cook Islands, the coconut crab is known as unga or kaveu, and in the Mariana Islands it is called ayuyu, and is sometimes associated with taotaomo'na because of the traditional belief that ancestral spirits can return in the form of animals such as the coconut crab.

A popular internet urban legend suggests that Amelia Earhart crash-landed on Nikumaroro and her remains were rapidly consumed by the island's coconut crabs. However, as no evidence of Earhart's plane has been found on or near Nikumaroro, this theory is generally discredited by historians.

== Conservation ==
Coconut crab populations in several areas have declined or become locally extinct due to both habitat loss and human predation. In 1981, it was listed on the IUCN Red List as a vulnerable species, but a lack of biological data caused its assessment to be amended to data deficient in 1996. In 2018, IUCN updated its assessment to vulnerable.

Conservation management strategies have been put in place in some regions, such as minimum legal size limit restrictions in Guam and Vanuatu, and a ban on the capture of egg-bearing females in Guam and the Federated States of Micronesia. In the Northern Mariana Islands, hunting of non-egg-bearing adults above a carapace length of 76 mm (3 in) may take place in September, October, and November, and only under license. The bag limit is five coconut crabs on any given day, and 15 across the whole season.

In Tuvalu, coconut crabs live on the motu (islets) in the Funafuti Conservation Area, a marine conservation area covering 33 km^{2} (12.74 mi^{2}) of reef, lagoon and motu on the western side of Funafuti atoll.

In the Philippines, the coconut crab (locally known by various names such as tatus, umang kagang, kasaso, kuray, or manla), has been declared as locally threatened by the 2001 Fisheries Administrative Order No. 208 of the Bureau of Fisheries and Aquatic Resources. It is illegal to catch, sell, purchase, transport, or possess coconut crabs, with violators being punishable by a fine of ₱120,000 and imprisonment for up to six years. Despite this, the open capture and consumption of coconut crabs for the tourist trade (particularly in the Batanes Islands) continues due to lax enforcement of the law and conflicts with other laws that supersede it, like the Indigenous Peoples' Rights Act of 1997. Populations across the islands have been declining rapidly due to overharvesting and habitat destruction.

== See also ==
- Calappa (crab)
