= Callichiridae =

Scientific classification
- Kingdom: Animalia
- Phylum: Arthropoda
- Clade: Pancrustacea
- Class: Malacostraca
- Order: Decapoda
- Suborder: Pleocyemata
- Clade: Reptantia
- Infraorder: Axiidea
- Family: Callichiridae; Manning & Felder, 1991

Genera
- See text

Family of crustaceans

Callichiridae is a family of ghost shrimp crustaceans belonging to the infraorder Axiidea, within the order Decapoda.

== Genera ==
Callianassidae is divided into 18 genera:

- Articullichirus Poore, Dworschak & Schnabel, 2022
- Audacallichirus Poore, Dworschak, Robles, Mantelatto & Felder, 2019
- Balsscallichirus Sakai, 2011
- Calliapagurops de Saint Laurent, 1973
- Callichirus Stimpson, 1866
- Corallianassa Manning, 1987
- Glypturoides Sakai, 2011
- Glypturus Stimpson, 1866
- Grynaminna Poore, 2000
- Karumballichirus Poore, Dworschak, Robles, Mantelatto & Felder, 2019
- Kraussillichirus Poore, Dworschak, Robles, Mantelatto & Felder, 2019
- Laticallichirus Komai, Yokooka, Henmi & Itani, 2019
- Lepidophthalmus Holmes, 1904
- Michaelcallianassa Sakai, 2022
- Mocallichirus Poore, Dworschak, Robles, Mantelatto & Felder, 2019
- Mucrollichirus Poore, Dworschak, Robles, Mantelatto & Felder, 2019
- Neocallichirus Sakai, 1988
- Thailandcallichirus Sakai, 2011
