= Georgaello =

Georgaello Temporal range: Tithonian

Scientific classification
- Kingdom: Animalia
- Phylum: Chordata
- Class: Chondrichthyes
- Infraclass: Neoselachii
- Genus: †Georgaello Greenfield, 2026

Type species
- †Georgaello elongata (Münster, 1836)

Other species
- †Georgaello wagneri (Agassiz, 1843)

Synonyms
- Genus synonymy: Aellopos Münster, 1836 (preoccupied by Aellopos Hübner, 1819); Aellopus Agassiz, 1846 (unjustified emendation; preoccupied by Aellopus Wolff, 1811); Aelopos Giebel, 1846 (incorrect subsequent spelling; unavailable); Allopos Fowler, 1911 (incorrect subsequent spelling; unavailable); Species synonymy: G. elongata; Aellopos elongata Münster, 1836; Aellopus elongata (Münster, 1836) G. wagneri; Aellopos wagneri Agassiz, 1843; Aellopus wagneri (Agassiz, 1843); Notidanus wagneri (Agassiz, 1843); Hexanchus wagneri (Agassiz, 1843)

Extinct genus of neoselachians

Georgaello is an extinct genus of neoselachians that lived during the Late Jurassic. It contains two species, G. elongata and G. wagneri, which have been found in Germany.

== Taxonomy ==
Aellopos elongata was named by Georg zu Münster in 1836 for a partial holomorphic specimen, a posterior body with dorsal and caudal (and possibly other) fins, (Note: Other sources have claimed that pelvic and/or pectoral and anal fins are also present in this specimen.) from the Kelheim locality in Germany. Aellopos wagneri was named by Louis Agassiz in 1843 for another partial holomorphic specimen, essentially the same parts as A. elongata, apparently from the Solnhofen locality in Germany. (Note: Other sources have claimed that this specimen originated from the Pappenheim or Eichstätt localities.) The holotypes of both species are housed at the Bayerische Staatssammlung für Paläontologie und Geologie; either of them may or may not be the specimen catalogued as SNSB-BSPG AS VII 1170. Additionally, some vertebrae were later extracted from the A. elongata holotype and possibly taken to the Uniwersytet Wrocławski.

The original genus name is preoccupied by the lepidopteran Aellopos named by Jacob Hübner in 1819. In 1846, Agassiz proposed the unjustified, but available, emendation Aellopus. However, this name is preoccupied by the hemipteran Aellopus named by Johann P. Wolff in 1811. The unavailable, incorrect subsequent spellings Aelopos and Allopos were used by Christoph Giebel in 1846 and Henry W. Fowler in 1911, respectively. A. wagneri was also formerly considered a species of Notidanus or Hexanchus but is not actually assignable to them. Since none of the aforementioned genera can be applied, Georgaello was named as a replacement in 2026.

G. wagneri was the first chondrichthyan recognized from the Solnhofen Limestone, while G. elongata was one of the first named as a distinct genus and species. The former was briefly described as Squalus by Rudolf Wagner in 1829 and the latter was named the same year as Asterodermus platypterus. Both species were redescribed by Johann A. Wagner in 1861, and G. elongata by Carl Hasse in 1882 and Otto M. Reis in 1893.

== Classification ==
The species of Georgaello were previously considered similar to and/or synonymous with several chondrichthyans from the Late Jurassic of Europe, including Pseudorhina acanthoderma, Notidanoides muensteri, Spathobatis bugesiaca, Archaeogracilidens macer, and Aellopobatis bavarica. They have also been compared with extant genera such as Galeorhinus, and Pristis and Pristiophorus.

Currently, the classification of Georgaello cannot be narrowed down past Neoselachii due to a lack of illustrations of the entire holotypes, uncertainty over which museum specimens the holotypes correspond to, and conflicting descriptions of the anatomy. The figured vertebrae of G. elongata have a tectospondylic calcification pattern like those of Pseudorhina spp. and Notidanoides muensteri. The figured dermal denticles match morphotypes found in Asterodermus platypterus, Pseudorhina alifera, Phorcynis catulina, Palaeoscyllium formosum, Paracestracion falcifer, and Macrourogaleus hassei.
