= Reuchenette Formation =

Jurassic-era geologic formation in Switzerland

- Stratigraphic range: Kimmeridgian, 152 Ma
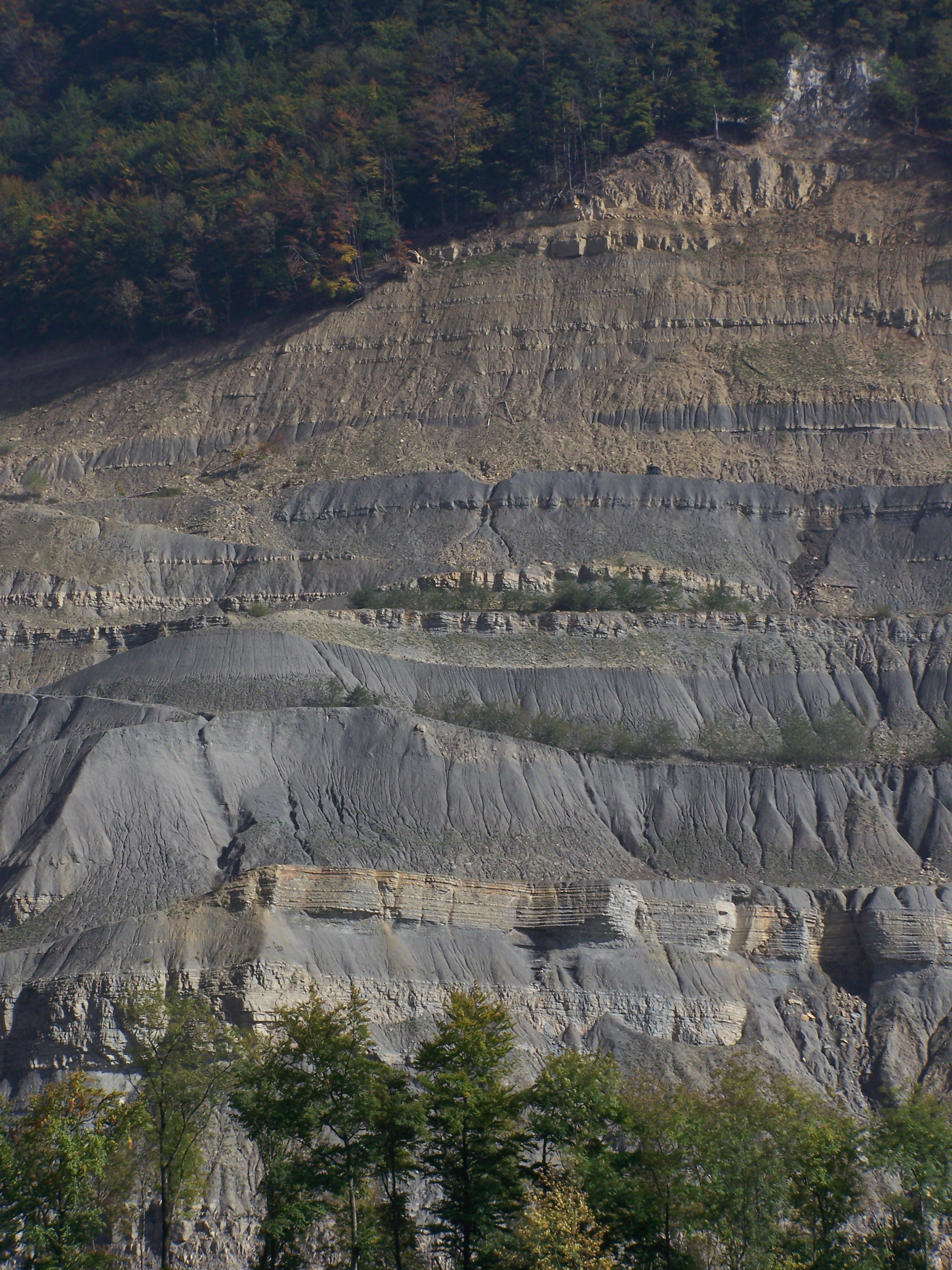
- Type: Geological formation
- Sub-units: Membre de Chevenez, Membre de Courtedoux, Marne du Banné, Membre de Vabenau
- Underlies: Twannbach Formation
- Overlies: Formation de Court, Balsthal-Formation, Membre de Porrentruy, Verena-Member, Holzflue-Member, Formation de Courgenay
- Thickness: 140 metres average, 160 m in type area.

Lithology
- Primary: Limestone
- Other: Mudstone

Location
- Region: Europe
- Country: Switzerland

The Reuchenette Formation is a Jurassic geologic formation in Switzerland. It is Kimmeridgian in age,precisely dated through ammonites between 152.7 to 152 mya. It predominantly consists of well stratified limestone, with lithology variable both laterally and stratigraphically including wackestones, packstones and grainstones, as well as mudstone. Dinosaur remains are among the fossils that have been recovered from the formation, including the Turiasaurian sauropod Amanzia greppini, alongside a theropod tooth belonging to Ceratosauria indet, originally assigned to Megalosaurus meriani. teleosaurid crocodyliformes are also known, including Sericodon, Proexochokefalos and Machimosaurus. The metriorhynchid thalatosuchians Torvoneustes and Dakosaurus. The hybodontid shark Asteracanthus. The thalassochelydian turtle Thalassemys and Solnhofia is known from the formation, as is the platychelyid turtles Platychelys, and the plesiochelyid turtle Plesiochelys.

== Vertebrate fauna ==
Color key: Taxon / Reclassified taxon / Taxon falsely reported as present / Dubious taxon or junior synonym / Ichnotaxon / Ootaxon / Morphotaxon

Notes
Uncertain or tentative taxa are in small text
~~crossed out~~ taxa are discredited.

=== Ray-finned fish ===
Genus	Species	Material	Notes	Images
"Lepidotes"	"L". laevis	Jaw Fragment	Ginglymodi	
"Lepidotes"	L. sp.	Four enameloid caps of the grinding tooth	Ginglymodia	
Gyrodus	G. "jurassicus"	Lower jaw	Pycnodontidae	
Gyrodus	G. sp.	Two incisors	Pycnodontidae	
Proscinetes	P. sp. 1	Enameloid cap of grinding tooth, six vomers and four prearticulars	Pycnodontidae	
Proscinetes	P. sp. 2	Enameloid cap of grinding tooth, vomer and three prearticulars	Pycnodontidae	
Pycnodontiforme	Indeterminate	Enameloid cap of grinding tooth	Pycnodontidae	
Caturus	C. sp.	Seven teeth	Caturidae	
Callopterus	C. sp.	Tooth	Caturidae	
Ionoscopus	I. sp.	Tooth	Caturidae	
Belonostomus	B. sp.	Predentary	Aspidorhynchidae	

=== Cartilaginous fish ===
Genus	Species	Material	Notes	Images
Asteracanthus	A. udulfensis	149 teeth from different parts of the jaw	Acrodontine hybodontiforme with strongly ornamented dentition adapted for crushing hard-shelled prey, so far only known from the Reuchenette Formation	
"Hybodus"	"H". sp.	101 teeth from different parts of the jaw	Hybodontiforme with teeth similar to teeth from "Hybodus" lusitanicus, but they are smaller and slightly different in the bluntness of their main cusp	
"Hybodus"	"H". multicuspidatus	19 mostly incomplete teeth	Hybodontiforme whose teeth are very similar to those of Polyacrodus brevicostatus, however that genus is considered a nomen dubium	
Planohybodus	P. sp.	22 teeth	Hybodontiforme that may represent a new species	
cf. Meristodonoides	cf. M. sp.	22 teeth	Hybodontiforme very similar to Meristodonoides, the teeth are too poorly preserved to properly confirm the inclusion in the genus	
Pseudorhina	P. sp.	One partial tooth	Pseudorhina tooth displaying a unique morphology, however too fragmentary to name	
Pseudorhina	P. acanthoderma	69 teeth from different parts of the jaw	Large angelshark known best by complete specimens hailing from the contemporary Nusplingen Limestone	
Pseudorhina	P. alifera	27 teeth from different parts of the jaw	Medium-sized angelshark known best by complete specimens hailing from the Solnhofen Limestone	
Protospinax	P. sp.	Three teeth	Squalomorph known from complete specimens hailing from the Solnhofen Limestone, the material from the Swiss Jura is too fragmentary to identify on a species level	
Heterodontidae	Indeterminate	One fragment of a fin spine and 5 teeth	Indeterminate bullhead shark	
Heterodontus	H. semirugosus	Six anterior teeth	Bullhead shark	
?Paracestracion	?P. sp.	One fin spine	Heterodontiforme tentatively referred to Paracestracion	
Palaeoscyllium	P. cf. formosum	15 teeth from different parts of the jaw	Catshark most similar to P. formosum	
Corysodon	C. cirinensis	Four teeth	The systematic position of this genus is disputed, its also known from Cerin and Solnhofen	
Rhinobatoidea	Indeterminate	25 teeth	Teeth that could either belong to Belemnobatis or Spathobathis	
Belemnobatis	B. sismondae	339 teeth from different parts of the jaw	Asterodermid known by more complete specimens from Cerin	
Belemnobatis	B. morinicus	55 teeth	Asterodermid known by more complete specimens from Cerin	
Spathobatis	S. bugesiacus	157 teeth from different parts of the jaw	Asterodermid known by more complete specimens from Cerin	
Ischyodus	I. quenstedti	16 fin spines, 34 dental plates, 9 palatine plates and 25 mandibular plates	Large chimaera with a wide distribution in Late Jurassic Europe	
Laffonia	L. helvetica	1 egg capsule	Egg capsule similar to those of the modern short-nose chimaera	

=== Reptiles ===
==== Testudinata ====
Genus	Species	Material	Notes	Images
Craspedochelys	C. picteti			
Craspedochelys	C. jaccardi			
Plesiochelys	P. bigleri			
Platychelys	P. oberndorferi			
Portlandemys	P. gracilis			
Solnhofia	S. brachyrhyncha			
Tropidemys	T. langii			
Thalassemys	T. bruntrutana			
Thalassemys	T. hugii			
Thalassemys	"T." moseri			

==== Crocodylomorpha ====
Genus	Species	Material	Notes	Images
Dakosaurus	D. maximus			
Machimosaurus	H. hugii			
Proexochokefalos	P. cf. bouchardi			
Sericodon	S. jugleri			
Torvoneustes	T. jurensis			

==== Dinosauria ====
Genus	Species	Material	Notes	Images
Amanzia	A. greppini			
Ceratosaurus	Indeterminate			

==== Dinosauria trace fossils ====
Genus	Species	Material	Notes	Images
Breviparopus-like	B. isp.		Breviparopus-like track	
Brontopodus	B. isp.		Sauropod track	
Jurabrontes	J. curtedulensis		Giant theropod tracks.	
Megalosauripus	M. transjuranicus		Theropod track	
Parabrontopodus	P. isp.		Sauropod track	

==== Pterosauria ====
Genus	Species	Material	Notes	Images
Pterodactyloidea	Indeterminate	Second wing phalanx (NMS 20'870)		

== Invertebrate Fauna ==
=== Cephalopoda ===
Genus	Species	Material	Notes	Images

== See also ==
- List of dinosaur-bearing rock formations
  - List of stratigraphic units with indeterminate dinosaur fossils
