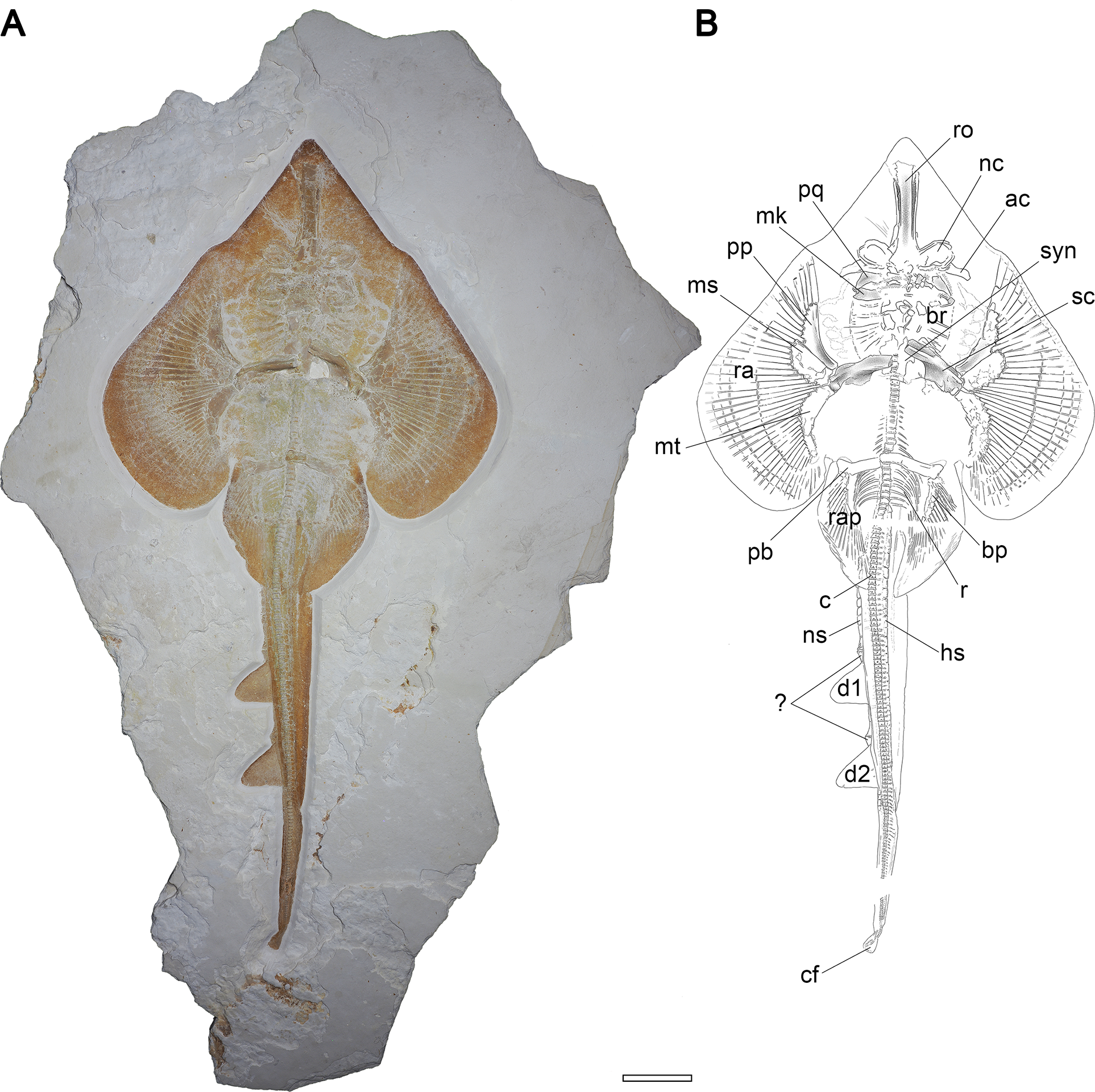
- Holotype specimen

Scientific classification
- Kingdom: Animalia
- Phylum: Chordata
- Class: Chondrichthyes
- Subclass: Elasmobranchii
- Division: Batomorphi
- Order: †Apolithabatiformes
- Family: †Asterodermidae
- Genus: †Apolithabatis; Türtscher et al., 2025
- Species: †A. seioma

Binomial name
- †Apolithabatis seioma Türtscher et al., 2025

= Apolithabatis =

Apolithabatis Temporal range: Late Jurassic, late Kimmeridgian

Extinct genus of ray fishes

Apolithabatis (meaning "fossil ray") is an extinct genus of asterodermid rays from the Late Jurassic (Kimmeridgian age) Torleite Formation (Solnhofen Archipelago) of Germany. The genus contains a single species, A. seioma, known from a single complete, well-preserved specimen.

== Discovery and naming ==
The Apolithabatis holotype specimen, DMA-JP-2010/007, was discovered in a Rygol Company limestone quarry representing outcrops of the Torleite Formation (Arnstorf Member) near Painten in Lower Bavaria, South Germany. The fossil is a holomorphic specimen, meaning that it comprises a complete, articulated animal. Based on the absence of claspers, it can be identified as a female individual.

In 2025, Türtscher et al. described Apolithabatis seioma as a new genus and species of rays in the extinct family Spathobatidae (Asterodermidae) based on these fossil remains. The generic name, Apolithabatis, combines the Greek words απολίθωμα (apolíthoma), meaning "fossil", and βατίς (batís), meaning "ray" or "skate". The specific name, seioma, is derived from the Greek word σείω (seío̱)—in turn coming from σεισμός (seismós), meaning "shake"—referencing the use of explosives to slabs of rock from the outcrop, one of which contained the holotype.

== Description ==
The general bauplan of Apolithabatis is quite similar to extant guitarfish. It is fairly large for a ray, at 120 centimetres (47 in) in length. Apolithabatis is characterized by its pointed snout, large, heart-shaped disc, and long tail. It has two similarly-sized dorsal fins located posterior to the pelvic fin radials.

Close-up photographs of the holotype under normal (left) and UV (right) light
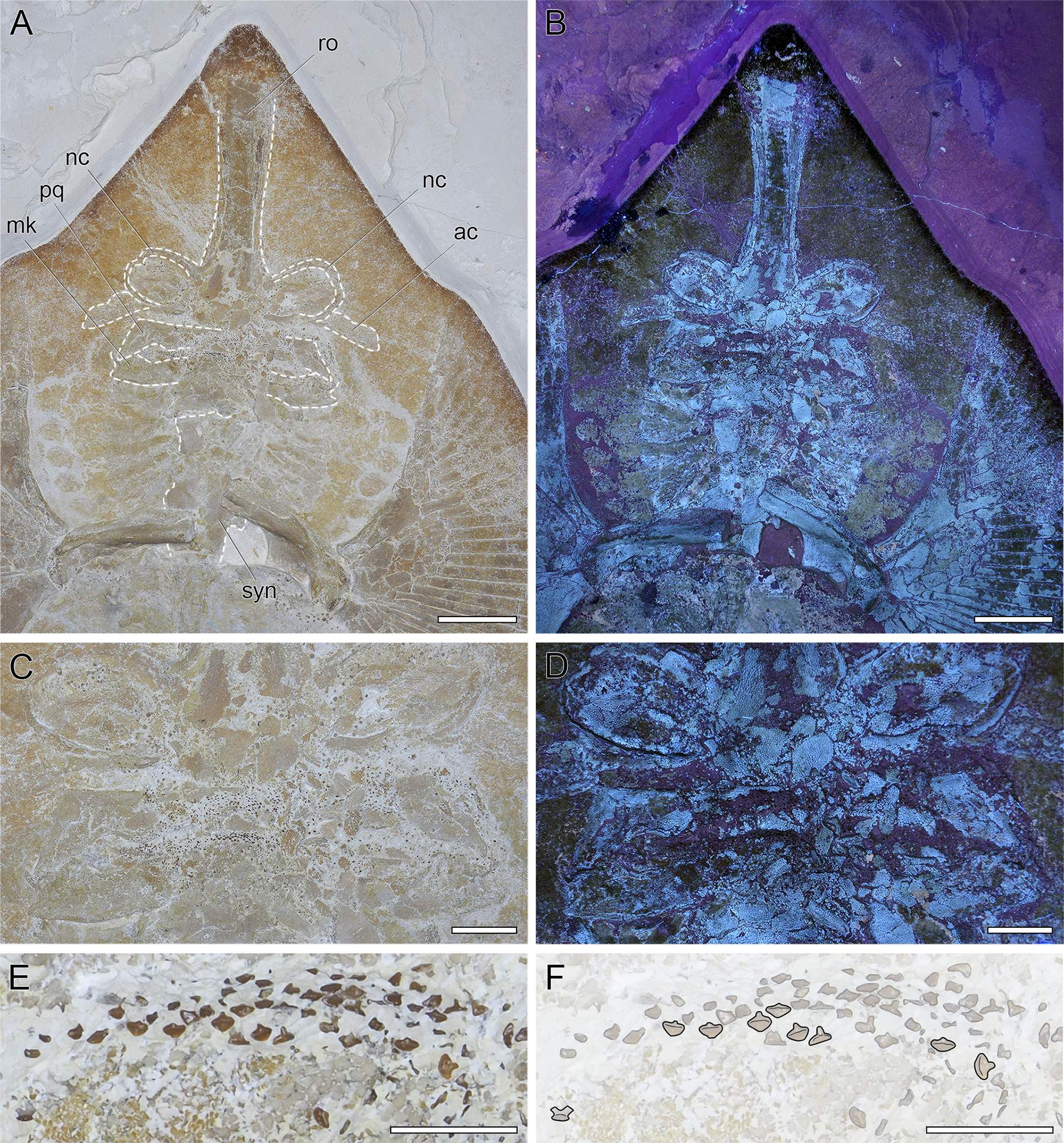
Head region

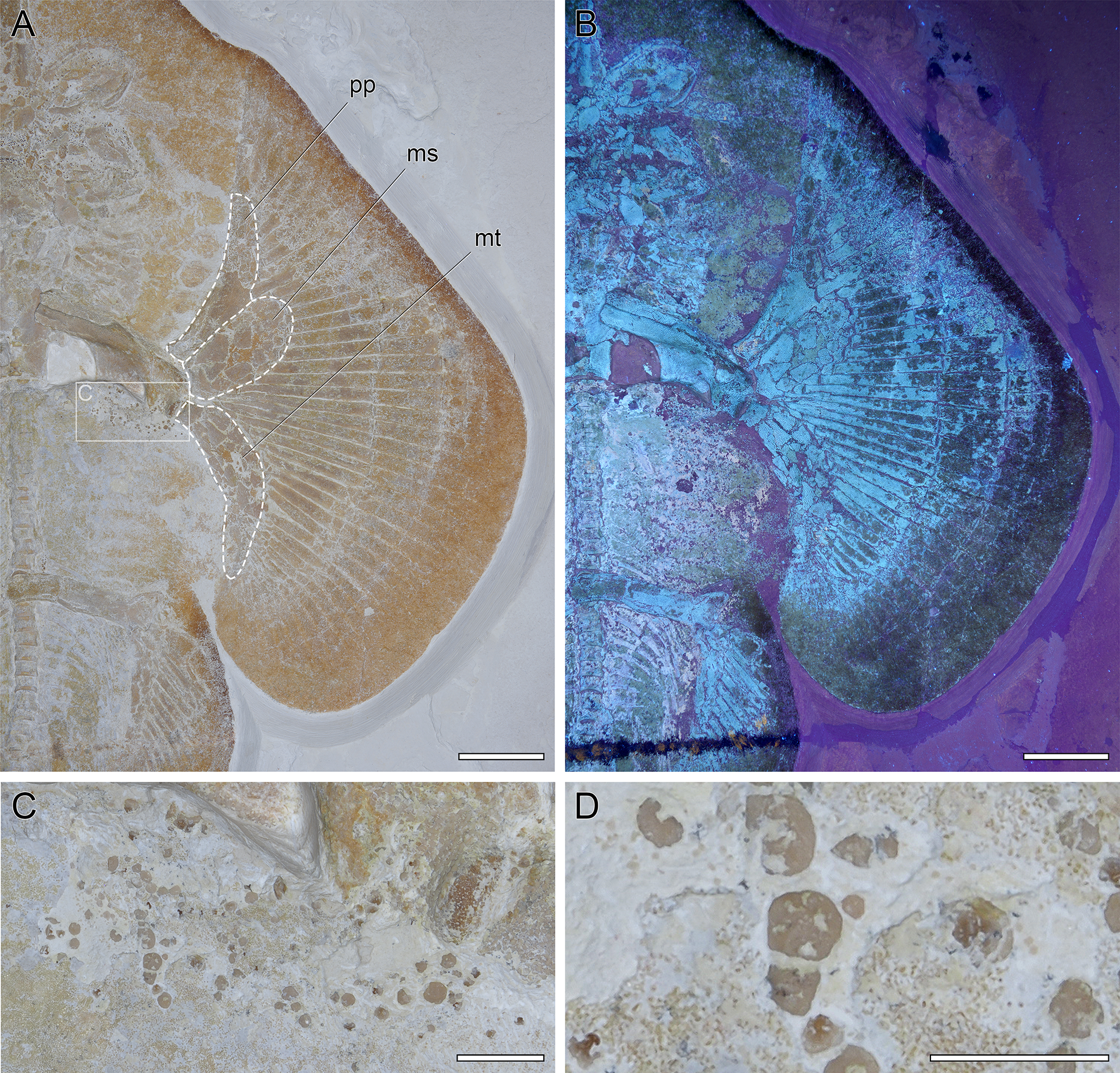
Pectoral fin

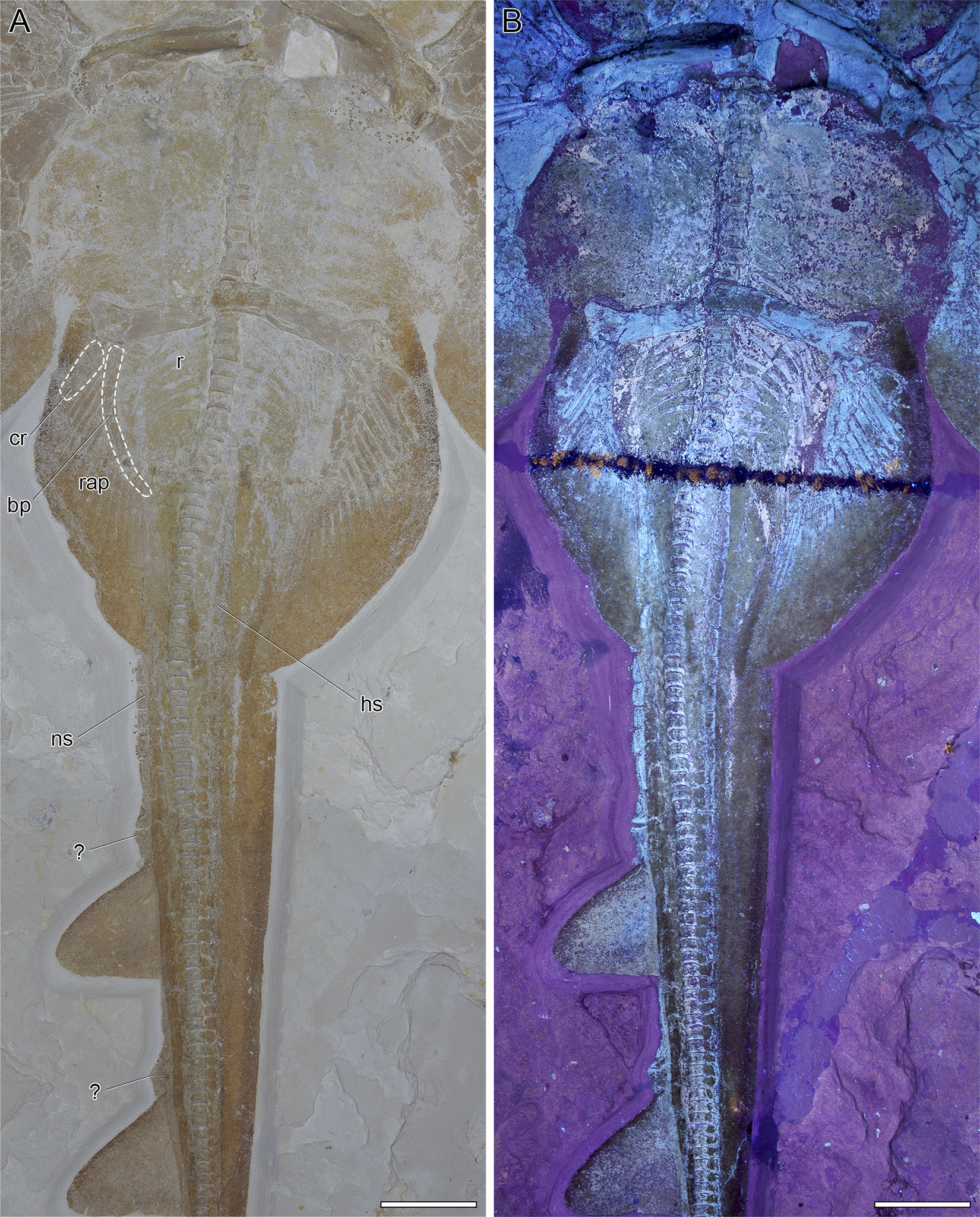
Pelvic region

== Classification ==
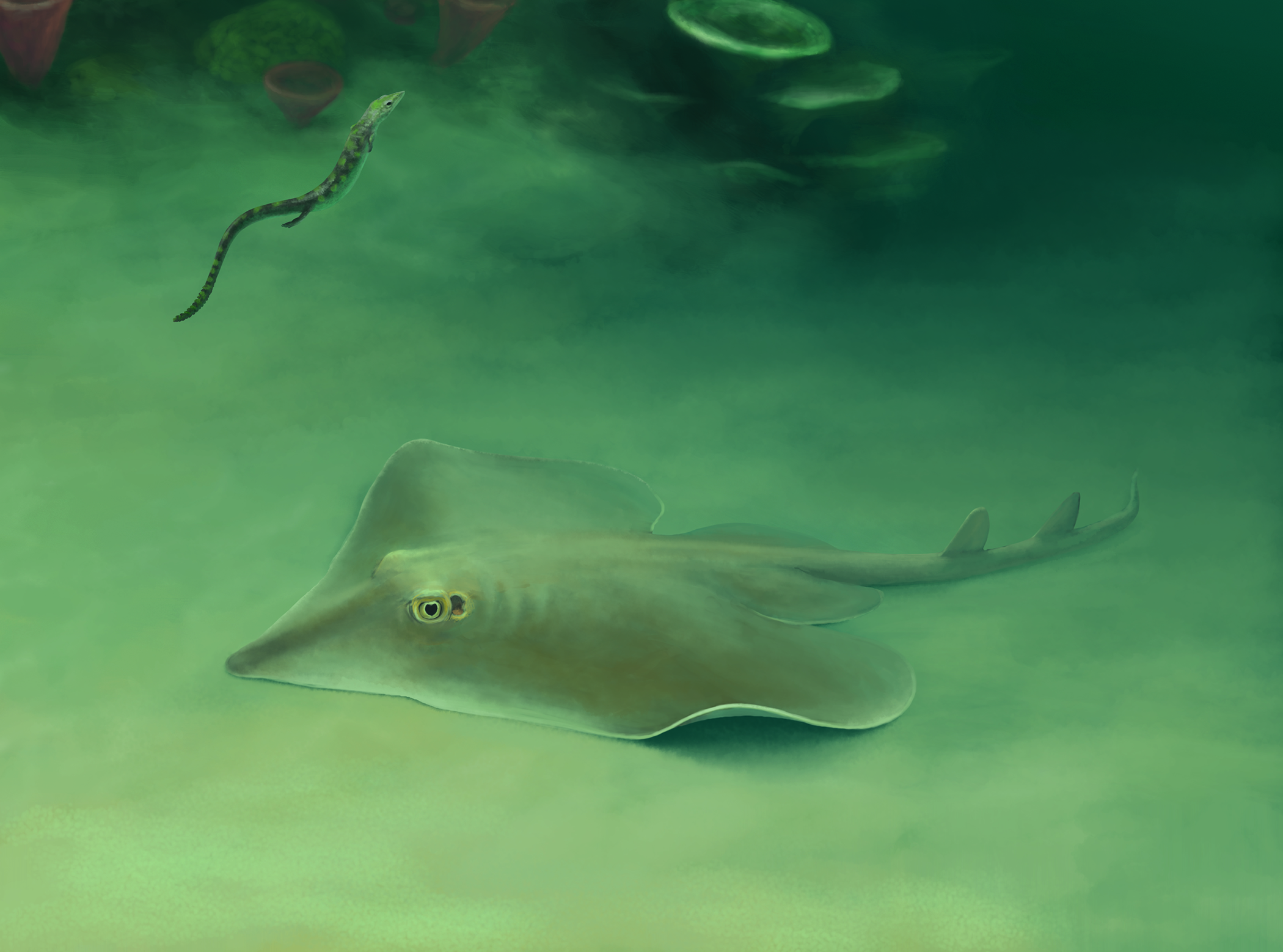
Life restoration

In their phylogenetic analyses, Türtscher et al. (2025) consistently recovered Apolithabatis as the sister taxon to Aellopobatis, another Solnhofen ray. They also found support for the assignment of these taxa to a basal clade of other Jurassic European batomorphs outside of the crown group, which they named Apolithabatiformes. Their results are displayed in the cladogram below:

- Batomorphi
  - †Apolithabatiformes Spathobatidae (Asterodermidae)
    - Asterodermus
    - Belemnobatis
    - Kimmerobatis
    - Spathobatis
    - - Aellopobatis
      - Apolithabatis
  - - Rhinopristiformes
    - - Rajiformes
      - - Torpediniformes
        - Myliobatiformes

== See also ==
- 2025 in paleoichthyology
- Paleobiota of the Solnhofen Limestone
