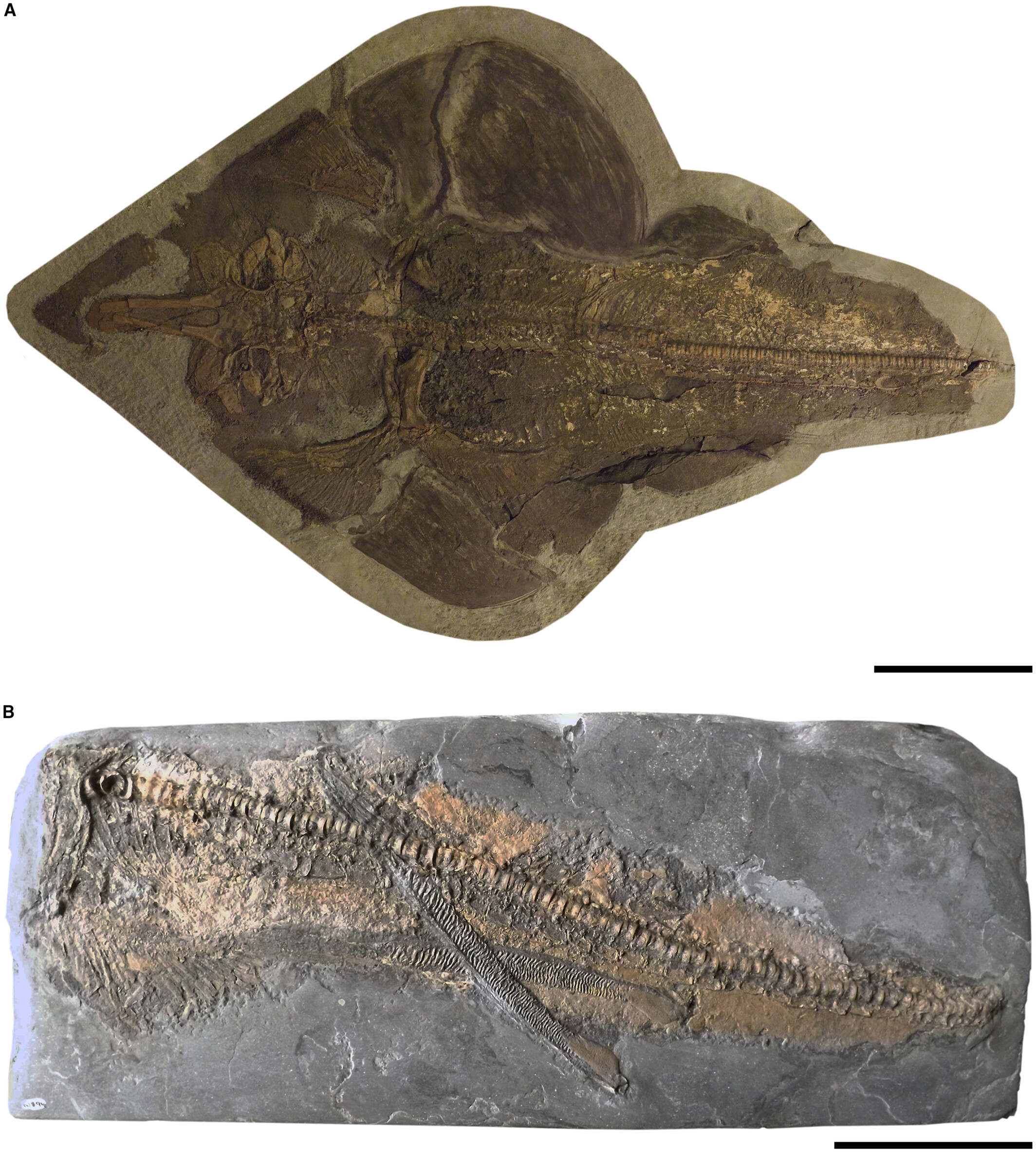
- Holotype (top) and paratype (bottom) specimens

Scientific classification
- Kingdom: Animalia
- Phylum: Chordata
- Class: Chondrichthyes
- Subclass: Elasmobranchii
- Division: Batomorphi
- Order: †Apolithabatiformes
- Family: †Asterodermidae
- Genus: †Kimmerobatis; Underwood & Claeson, 2019
- Species: †K. etchesi

Binomial name
- †Kimmerobatis etchesi Underwood & Claeson, 2019

= Kimmerobatis =

Kimmerobatis Temporal range: Late Jurassic, early Tithonian

Extinct genus of ray fishes

Kimmerobatis (meaning "Kimmeridge ray") is an extinct genus of asterodermid rays from the Late Jurassic (Tithonian age) Kimmeridge Clay Formation of England. The genus contains a single species, K. etchesi, known from two partial, well-preserved specimens.

== Discovery and naming ==
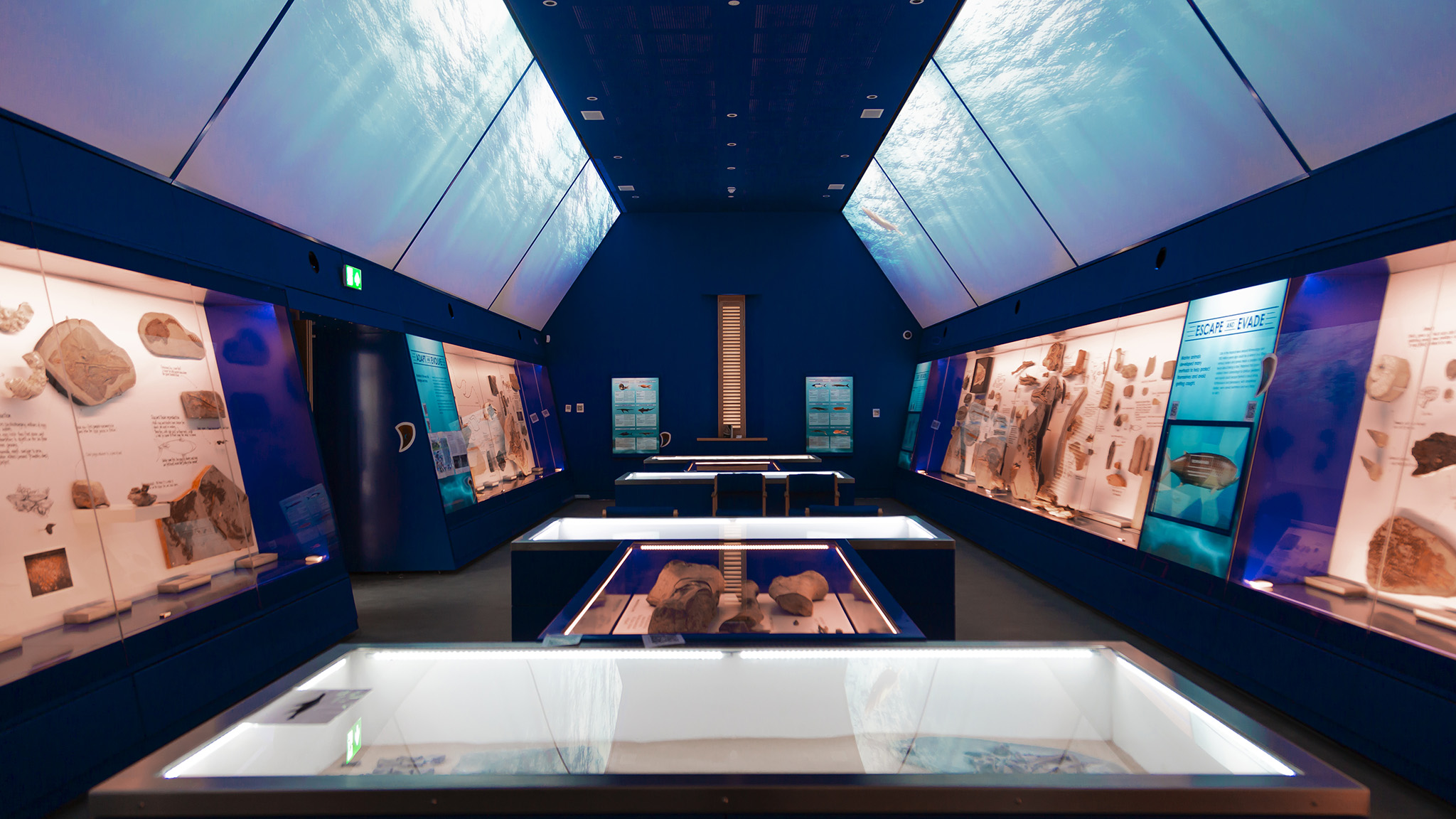
Main exhibition gallery of The Etches Collection with the Kimmerobatis holotype on display (far left)

The Kimmerobatis fossils were discovered in outcrops of the upper Kimmeridge Clay Formation near Kimmeridge Bay in Dorset, southern England. The holotype specimen, MJML K874, consists of the anterior part of an individual missing the end of the tail, preserved in dorsal view. It was found in layers of the Pectinatus Zone. An additional specimen, MJML K1894, was referred as a paratype, consisting of much of the posterior part of an individual. It was found in the Hudlestoni Zone. These fossils are holomorphic specimens, meaning they comprise complete, articulated animals. Based on the absence of claspers in the holotype and their presence in the paratype, these specimens can be identified as female and male individuals, respectively.

In 2019, Underwood & Claeson described Kimmerobatis etchesi as a new genus and species of rays in the extinct family Spathobatidae (Asterodermidae) based on these fossil remains. The generic name, Kimmerobatis, combines a reference to the type locality near Kimmeridge with the Greek βατίς (batís), meaning "ray" or "skate". The specific name, etchesi, honours Steve Etches for collecting and preparing both Kimmerobatis specimens.

== Description ==
The general bauplan of Kimmerobatis is quite similar to extant guitarfish. In contrast to other Jurassic rays, it is characterized by its pointed, wedge-like rostrum fused to the pectoral fins. This snout region is not blunt like in Belemnobatis and it lacks the protruding appendage seen in Aellopobatis and Spathobatis. Both Kimmerobatis specimens preserve a phosphatized outline of soft tissue. This includes a dark splotch on the left side of the skull that might represent traces of retinal pigment.

== Classification ==
Underwood & Claeson (2019) tested the relationships of Kimmerobatis with other batomorphs in a limited phylogenetic analysis. They recovered it as the sister taxon to Belemnobatis and, depending on the methodology, in a clade also containing Spathobatis. These genera were found as basal batomorphs within the crown group (group containing all extant rays).

In their 2025 description of Apolithabatis, Türtscher et al. (2025) used more thorough analyses to test the phylogenetic relationships of Kimmerobatis and other rays from the Solnhofen Archipelago. They found support for the assignment of these taxa to a basal clade of other Jurassic European batomorphs outside of the crown group, which they named Apolithabatiformes. Their results are displayed in the cladogram below:

- Batomorphi
  - †Apolithabatiformes Spathobatidae (Asterodermidae)
    - Asterodermus
    - Belemnobatis
    - Kimmerobatis
    - Spathobatis
    - - Aellopobatis
      - Apolithabatis
  - - Rhinopristiformes
    - - Rajiformes
      - - Torpediniformes
        - Myliobatiformes

== See also ==
- 2019 in paleoichthyology
- The Etches Collection
- Paleobiota of the Solnhofen Limestone
