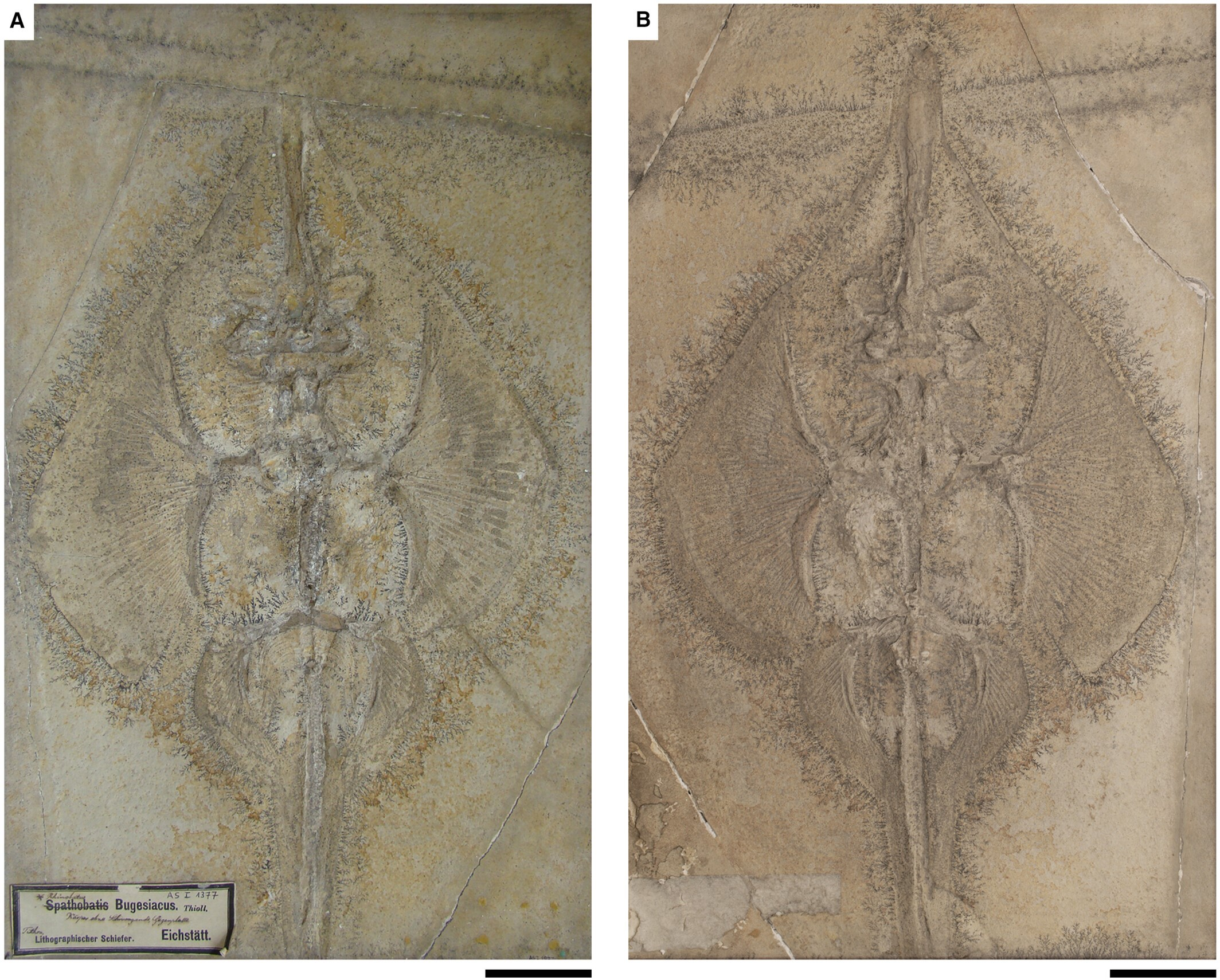
- Holotype, part and counterpart

Scientific classification
- Kingdom: Animalia
- Phylum: Chordata
- Class: Chondrichthyes
- Subclass: Elasmobranchii
- Division: Batomorphi
- Order: †Apolithabatiformes
- Family: †Asterodermidae
- Genus: †Aellopobatis; Türtscher et al., 2024
- Species: †A. bavarica

Binomial name
- †Aellopobatis bavarica Türtscher et al., 2024

= Aellopobatis =

Aellopobatis Temporal range: Late Jurassic, early Tithonian

Extinct genus of ray fishes

Aellopobatis (meaning "storm wind ray") is an extinct genus of asterodermid rays from the Late Jurassic (Tithonian age) Solnhofen Archipelago of Germany. The genus contains a single species, A. bavarica, known from several complete, well-preserved specimens.

== Discovery and naming ==
In 1836, Georg zu Münster briefly mentioned a fragmentary specimen comprising the posterior part of the animal. He proposed the name "Aellopos elongata" for this specimen. However unbeknownst to Münster, the generic name Aellopos was preoccupied by a moth, making it unavailable. Subsequent reviews by Arthur S. Woodward in 1889 suggested that the larger specimens referred to "Aellopos", as well as those in the genera Euryarthra and Spathobatis, were effectively identical to Rhinobatus in all aspects except for size, which he deemed as insufficient to distinguish them. Most research since then has followed this synonymy, albeit under the genus Spathobatis rather than Rhinobatus.

In 2024, Türtscher et al. used geometric and morphometric analyses to revise the known fossil record of Jurassic European batomorphs. Their research identified the large morphotypes of Spathobatis as belonging to a distinct taxon based on significant differences in anatomy and body shapes. As such, they described Aellopobatis bavarica as a new genus and species of rays in the extinct family Spathobatidae (Asterodermidae) based on these fossil remains. The generic name, Aellopobatis, honors Münster's initial name proposal, "Aellopos"; it combines reference to the mythological harpy Aello (derived from the Greek ἀελλάς (Aëllṓ), meaning "storm wind") with βατίς (batís), meaning "ray" or "skate". The specific name, bavarica, references the discovery of the fossil material in Bavaria.

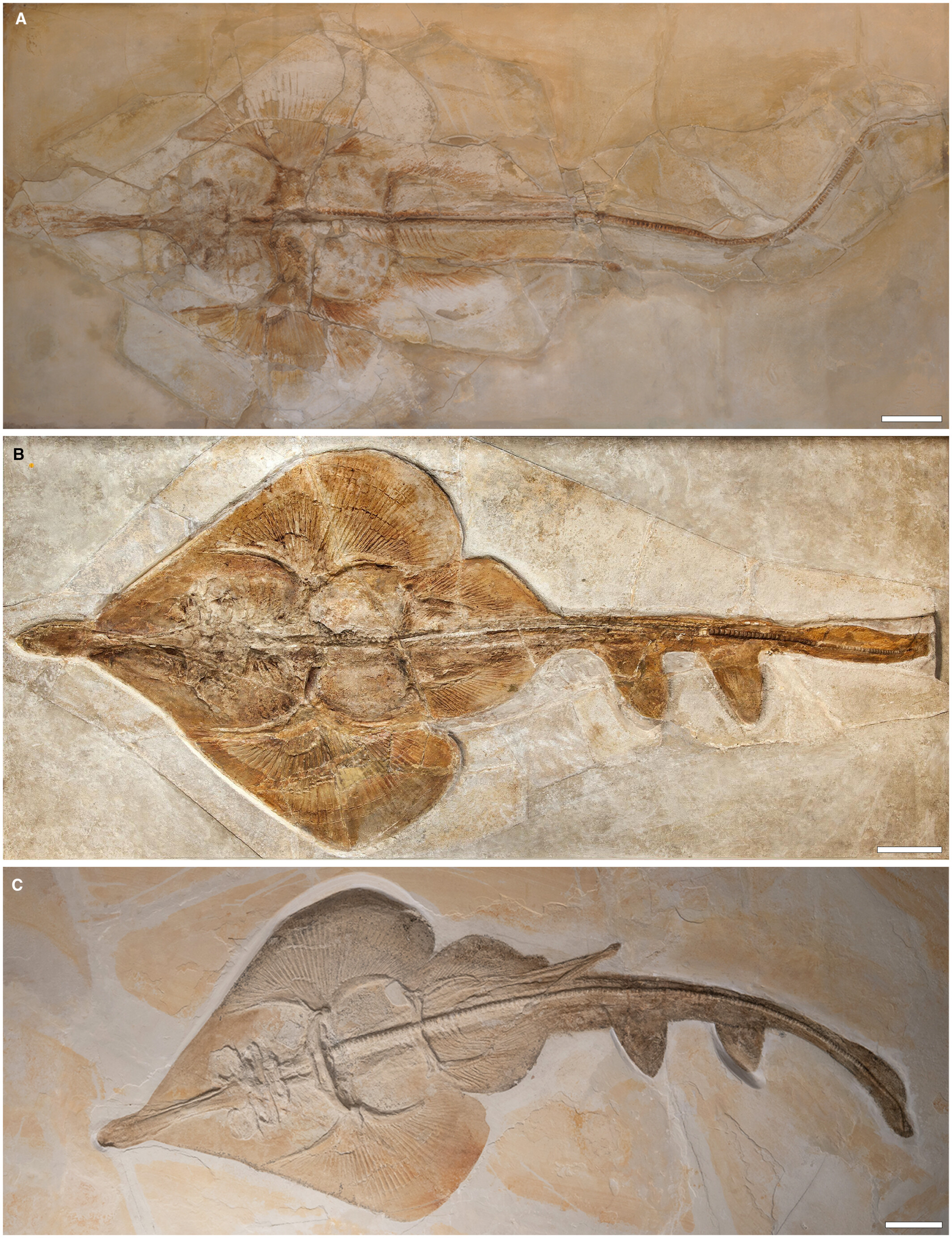
Three specimens referred to Aellopobatis (males in A and C, female in B)

Fossil material referred to Aellopobatis has been found in several localities within the extensive Solnhofen Archipelago of Bavaria, Germany, including Solnhofen, Eichstätt, Zandt, Kelheim, Langenaltheim, and Blumenberg. Most of these fossils are holomorphic specimens, meaning they comprise complete, articulated animals. The holotype specimen, SNSB-BSPG AS I 1377 and SNSB-BSPG AS I 1378, is a part and counterpart from Kelheim preserving an individual missing the end of the tail. Based on the absence of claspers, it can be identified as a female individual. More than ten other male and female specimens are also known, some of which are held in private collections.

== Description ==
The general bauplan of Aellopobatis is quite similar to extant guitarfish. It is fairly large for a ray, at 170 centimetres (67 in) in length. Aellopobatis is characterized by an extremely elongated rostrum. It also has a large, heart-shaped disc and a long, narrow tail. It has two similarly-sized dorsal fins located posterior to the pelvic fin radials. In male specimens, the claspers are long and slender.

== Classification ==
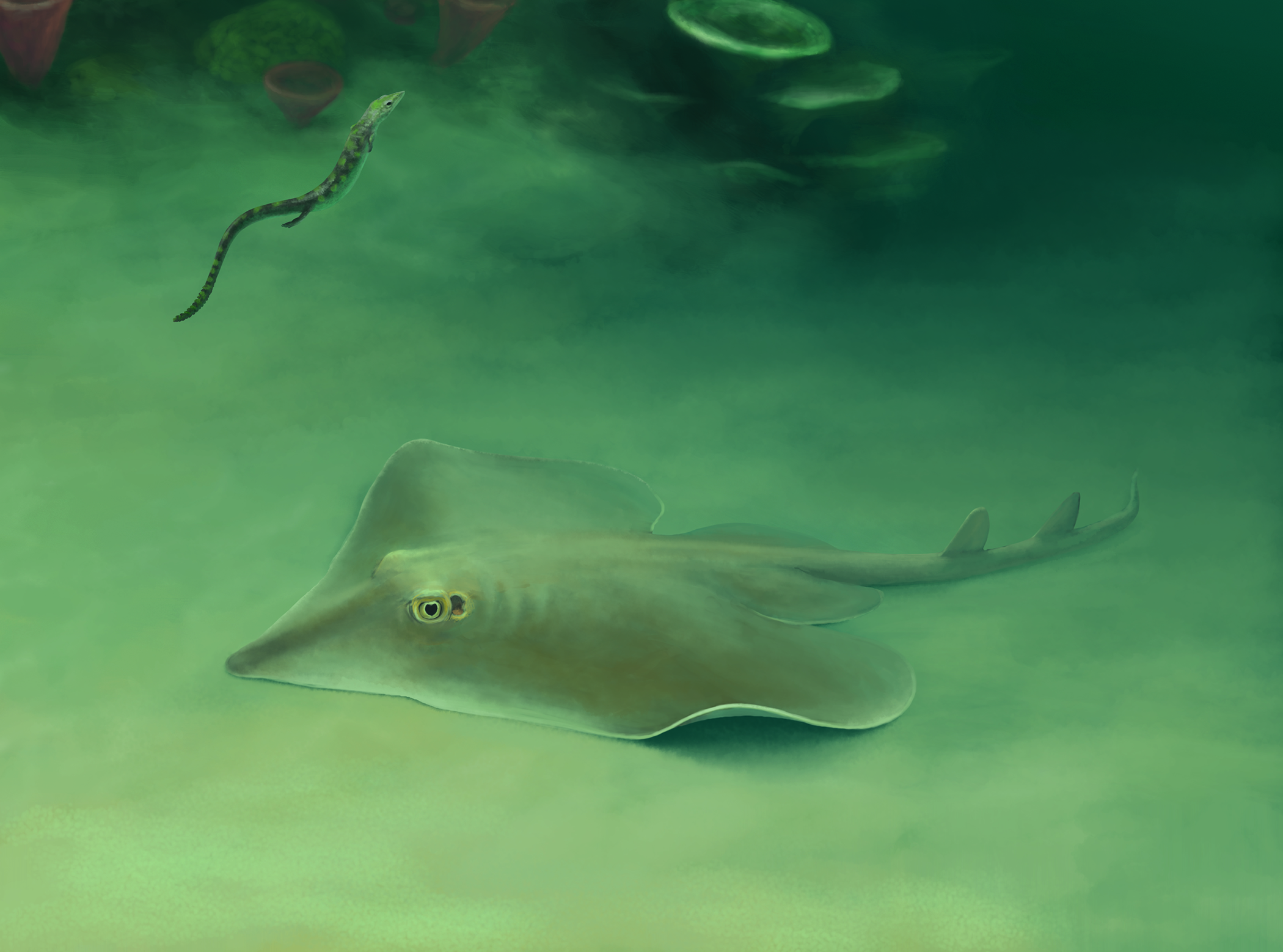
Life restoration of the closely related Apolithabatis

In their 2025 description of Apolithabatis, Türtscher et al. (2025) tested the phylogenetic relationships of Aellopobatis and other Solnhofen rays. They consistently recovered these two genera as closely related sister taxa. They also found support for the assignment of these taxa to a basal clade of other Jurassic European batomorphs outside of the crown group, which they named Apolithabatiformes. Their results are displayed in the cladogram below:

- Batomorphi
  - †Apolithabatiformes Spathobatidae (Asterodermidae)
    - Asterodermus
    - Belemnobatis
    - Kimmerobatis
    - Spathobatis
    - - Aellopobatis
      - Apolithabatis
  - - Rhinopristiformes
    - - Rajiformes
      - - Torpediniformes
        - Myliobatiformes

== See also ==
- 2024 in paleoichthyology
- Paleobiota of the Solnhofen Limestone
