= A. atratus =

A. atratus may refer to:

- Abacetus atratus, a ground beetle found in India and Sri Lanka
- Aellopus atratus, a seed bug found in Europe and western Asia
- Aleurotrachelus atratus, the palm-infesting whitefly, native to Brazil and invasive to many other tropic and subtropic countries
- Alloterocucus atratus, a prehistoric beetle
- Ameiva atratus, a synonym of Redonda ameiva, the Redonda ground dragon
- Atractus atratus, a snake found in Colombia
- Austrogomphus atratus, a synonym of Hemigomphus atratus, the black vicetail, a dragonfly found in Australia
