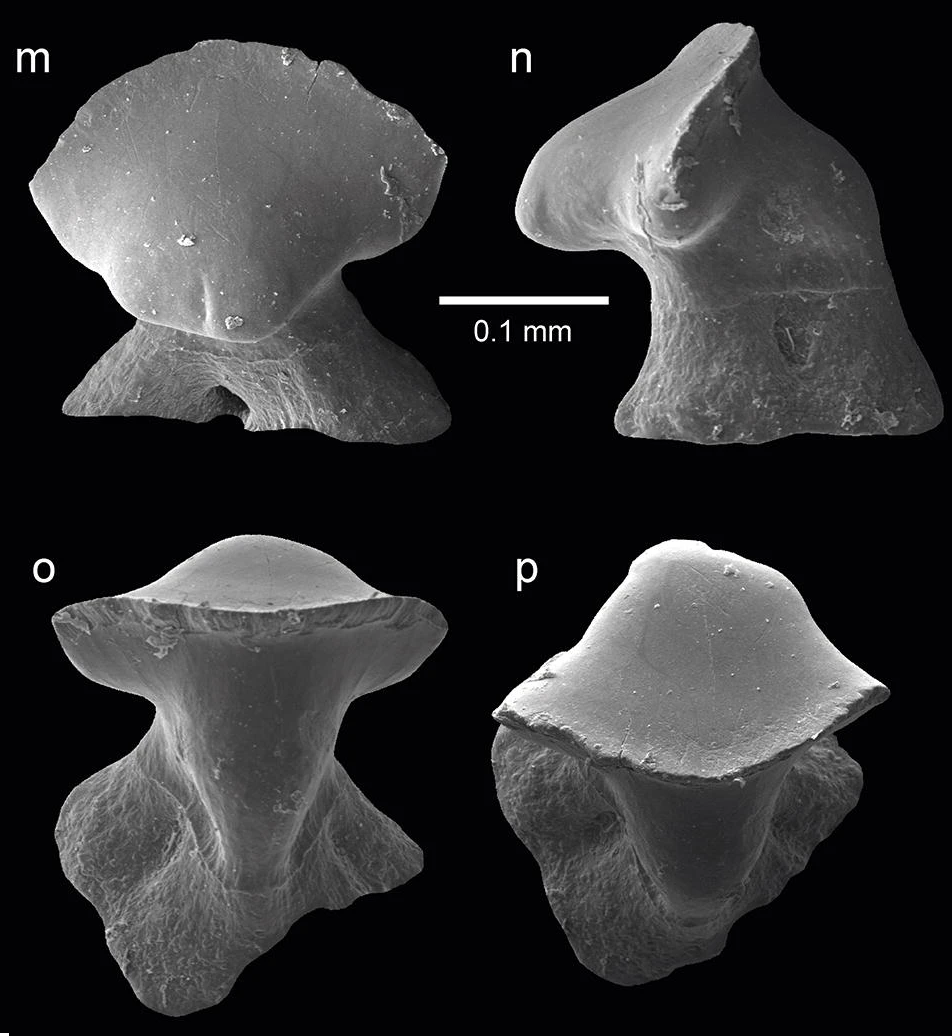
- Holotype tooth

Scientific classification
- Kingdom: Animalia
- Phylum: Chordata
- Class: Chondrichthyes
- Subclass: Elasmobranchii
- Order: Rajiformes
- Genus: †Antiquaobatis; Stumpf & Kriwet, 2019
- Species: †A. grimmenensis

Binomial name
- †Antiquaobatis grimmenensis Stumpf & Kriwet, 2019

= Antiquaobatis =

Antiquaobatis Temporal range: Late Pliensbachian 183 Ma

Extinct genus of cartilaginous fishes

Antiquaobatis is an extinct genus of ray from the Early Jurassic (Late Pliensbachian) of Europe, containing the single species A. grimmenensis. It is the oldest known described member of the Rajiformes, and is based on a single tooth from Pliensbachian of Northern Germany. It was recovered from the Grimmen Clay Pit, on Spinatum strata that belongs in the region to the Wolgast Formation. The holotype is a single antero-lateral tooth, very small and slightly asymmetrical, measuring 0.25 mm in maximum height and 0.26 mm in maximum width, that has an overall morphology, that suggests a consistent referral to Batoidea, encompassing all skates and rays. The tooth has an overall rather gracile crown morphology, different from any other know jurassic batomorphs, indicating closest affinities to the monotypic genus Engaibatis schultzei from the Kimmeridgian-Tithonian of Tanzania.

== Paleoenvironment ==
The Late Pliensbachian level of the Grimmen clay pit was thought to be part of the Allenstein Formation, yet is part of a local progradational package of sand-prone fluvio-deltaic to coastal-deltaic strata. The described tooth of Antiquaobatis is considered to come from allochthonous origin, as it has suffered massively from post-mortem breakage in many cases, most probably due to extensive reworking and redistribution generated by current activities. This taxon probably lived on the marine areas that were located in closer proximity to the Fennoscandian mainland, such as the paralic depositional environments of the Sorthat Formation of Bornholm, Denmark. But it also could have been moved from the Polish Basin, as on the deposition of this tooth it was flooded by the sea, as proven by the find of ammonites on central Poland.

A Nectobenthic lifestyle has been suggested for Jurassic batomorphs, specially complete taxa such as Belemnobatis and Spathobatis, that are superficially similar to extant members of which are generally characterized by sharing a bauplan similar to extant Rhinobatidae, adapted to eat hard-shelled prey. Antiquaobatis appears to have used different, less specialized and probably more opportunistic feeding strategies, as suggested by the gracile and high tooth morphology.
