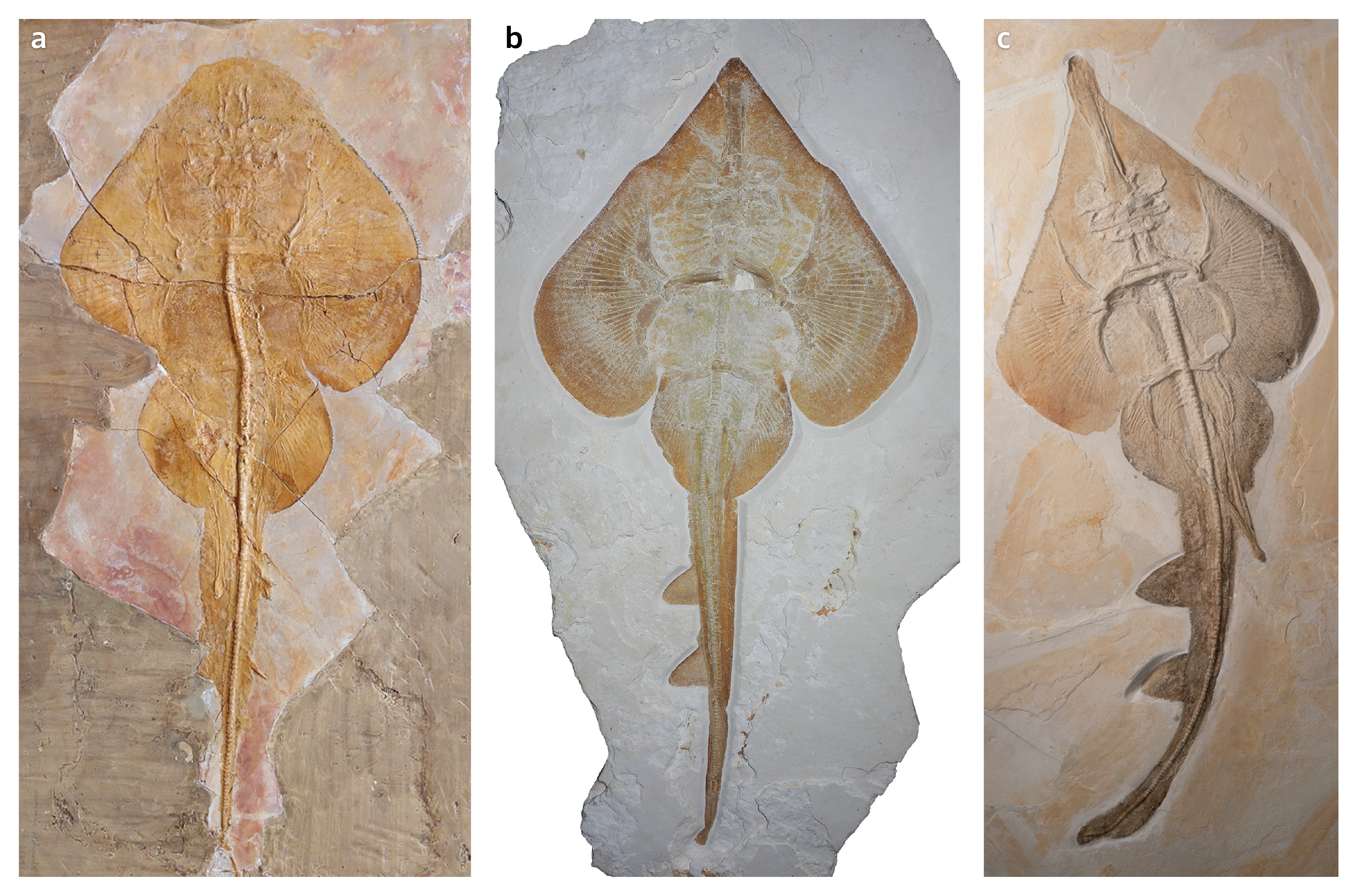
- Three asterodermids: (a) Belemnobatis (blunt-snout), (b) Apolithabatis (wedge-snout), (c) Aellopobatis (elongate-snout)

Scientific classification
- Kingdom: Animalia
- Phylum: Chordata
- Class: Chondrichthyes
- Subclass: Elasmobranchii
- Division: Batomorphi
- Order: †Apolithabatiformes; Türtscher et al., 2025
- Family: †Asterodermidae; Bonaparte, 1850

Type genus
- †Asterodermus Agassiz, 1836

Genera
- †Aellopobatis; †Apolithabatis; †Asterodermus; †Belemnobatis; †Kimmerobatis; †Spathobatis

Synonyms
- Spathobatidae Dames, 1888

= Asterodermidae =

Asterodermidae Temporal range: Late Jurassic, late Kimmeridgian–early Tithonian

Extinct family of rays

Asterodermidae (also referred to as Spathobatidae) is an extinct family of rays known from the Late Jurassic epoch. Asterodermidae is the only family within the order Apolithabatiformes (spinorays). All named genera within this family are known from Europe, although a specimen from Argentina may also have affinities with these taxa. The general body plan of asterodermids is reminiscent of modern guitarfish.

== Taxonomic history ==
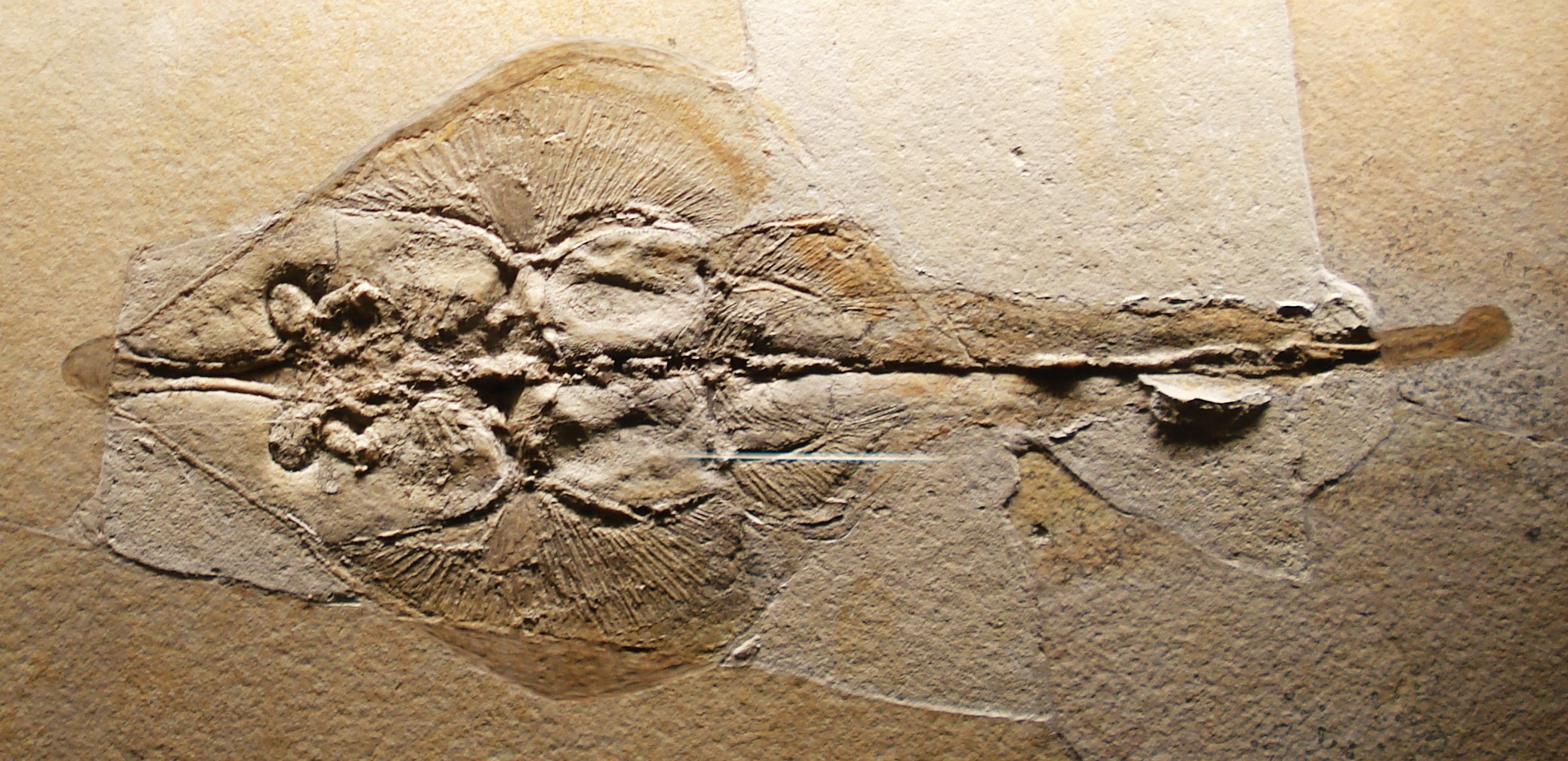
Fossil of Asterodermus

Well-preserved holomorphic ray fossils have been known from Late Jurassic Lagerstätte deposits throughout Europe since the mid-19th century, characterized by their complete, articulated preservation including soft tissue outlines. Asterodermus, Spathobatis, and Belemnobatis were named in 1836, 1849, and 1852, respectively. In 1850, Charles Lucien Bonaparte first mentioned the clade Asterodermini (with Asterodermus as the type genus). As such, the family-level name Asterodermidae is also attributed to Bonaparte. An 1888 publication by Wilhelm Dames is the first known mention of the family Spathobatidae, albeit without a formal diagnosis or description. While this would not be accepted by the modern guidelines of the International Code of Zoological Nomenclature, the establishment of the name before 1999 allows for its use. This publication went largely unnoticed until 2024, so researchers in the early 21st century falsely attributed the clade's authorship to Underwood, 2006.

Kimmerobatis, an additional genus, was described in 2019. A thorough review of Jurassic batomorphs in 2024 allowed researchers to reidentify several specimens previously categorized as a large Spathobatis morphotype as belonging to the new genus Aellopobatis. Apolithabatis was named based on a single well-preserved specimen the following year, with the order Apolithabatiformes erected with this as the type genus. The common name "spinorays" was proposed for apolithibatiforms, referencing their unique dorsal fin spines. The name is also an allusion to "rhinorays", the common name of rhinopristiforms, which is the clade asterodermids were originally assigned to.

While the family name Spathobatidae was used in reference to these taxa for several years, a 2025 nomenclatural comment noted the priority of the name Asterodermidae, indicating it should be used instead.

== Classification ==
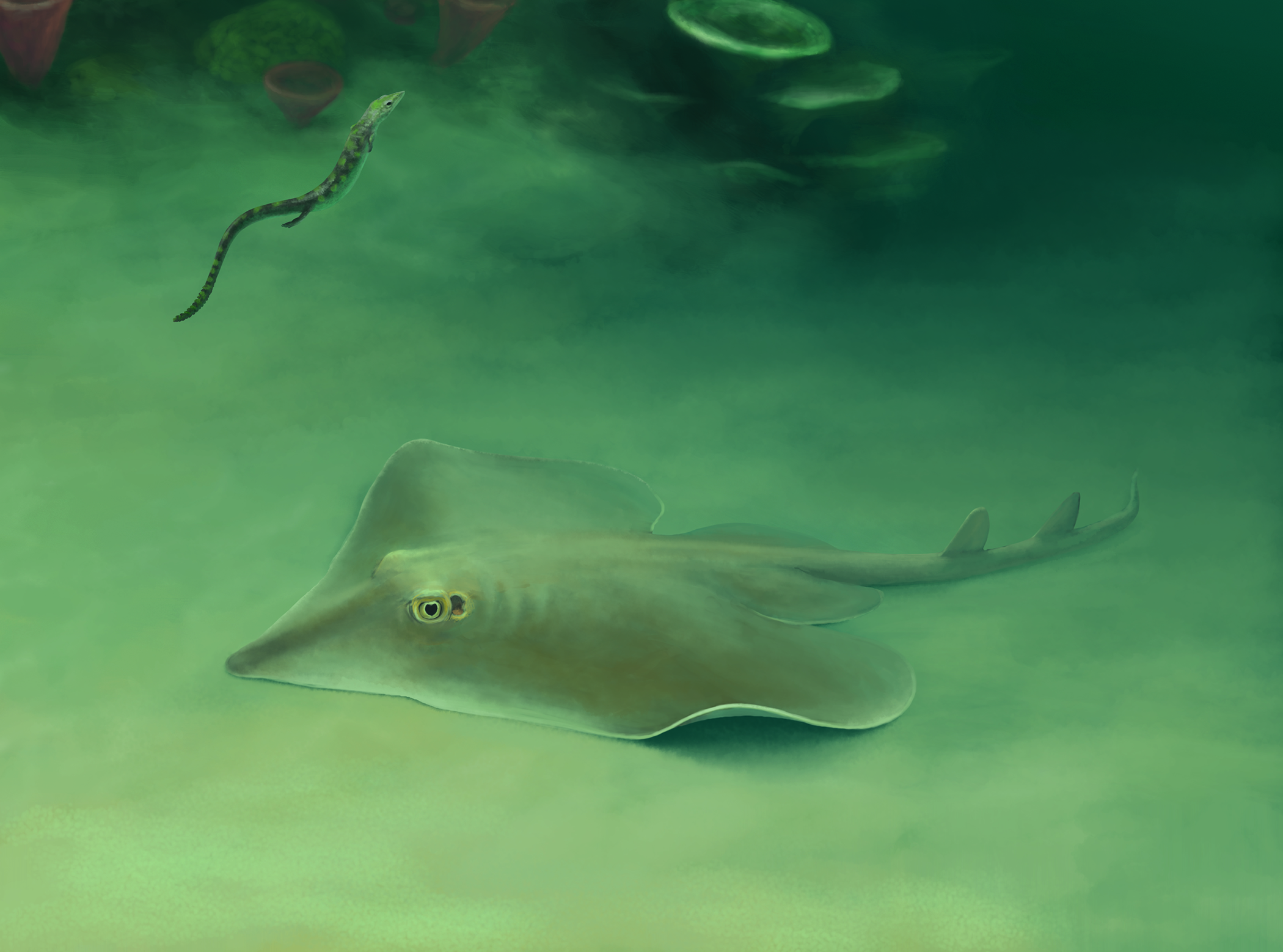
Life restoration of Apolithabatis

The phylogenetic relationships of these Jurassic batomorphs have been unclear. Some researchers have expressed uncertainty regarding whether "spathobatids" ("asterodermids") form a paraphyletic or monophyletic group and to which order they belong.

In their 2025 description of Apolithabatis, Türtscher et al. analyzed most of the Jurassic European holomorphic ray fossils. Their phylogenetic results varied based on the methodology used. Their majority-rule consensus tree (displayed in the cladogram below) placed all of these taxa in a monophyletic clade at the base of Batomorphi, outside of the crown group (all of the extant rays and their closest relatives). As such, they established the new order Apolithabatiformes to hold the family Spathobatidae (Asterodermidae). The authors emphasized that, while several consistent characters unite these genera within a group, the order is a working hypothesis subject to change with the future description of additional specimens. Their maximum likelihood analysis, in contrast, rendered the apolithabatiforms a paraphyletic grade of early batomorphs.

- Batomorphi
  - †Apolithabatiformes †Asterodermidae
    - †Asterodermus
    - †Belemnobatis
    - †Kimmerobatis
    - †Spathobatis
    - - †Aellopobatis
      - †Apolithabatis
  - - Rhinopristiformes
    - - Rajiformes
      - - Torpediniformes
        - Myliobatiformes

In 2026, Türtscher and colleagues assessed the anatomy and relationships of the extinct rhinopristiform Myledaphus. As before, their majority-rule consensus tree recovered a monophyletic Apolithabatiformes. The strict consensus tree recovered all members of this clade, as well as many other ray genera and orders, in an unresolved polytomy. The maximum-likelihood and Bayesian inference trees rendered Apolithabatiformes paraphyletic. In both of these, Aellopobatis and Apolithabatis were recognized as sister taxa, while only the latter also placed Asterodermus and Spathobatis in a sister group. These results are displayed in the cladogram below:

- Batomorphi
  - †Belemnobatis
  - - - †Asterodermus
      - †Spathobatis
    - - - †Aellopobatis
        - †Apolithabatis
      - - †Kimmerobatis
        - - Rajiformes
          - - Myliobatiformes
            - - Rhinopristiformes
              - Torpediniformes

== See also ==
- Paleobiota of the Solnhofen Limestone
