= Abacetus atratus =

Scientific classification
- Kingdom: Animalia
- Phylum: Arthropoda
- Class: Insecta
- Order: Coleoptera
- Suborder: Adephaga
- Family: Carabidae
- Genus: Abacetus
- Species: A. atratus

Binomial name
- Abacetus atratus (Dejean, 1828)

Species of beetle

Abacetus atratus is a species of ground beetle in the subfamily Pterostichinae. It was described by Dejean in 1828 and is found in India and Sri Lanka.
