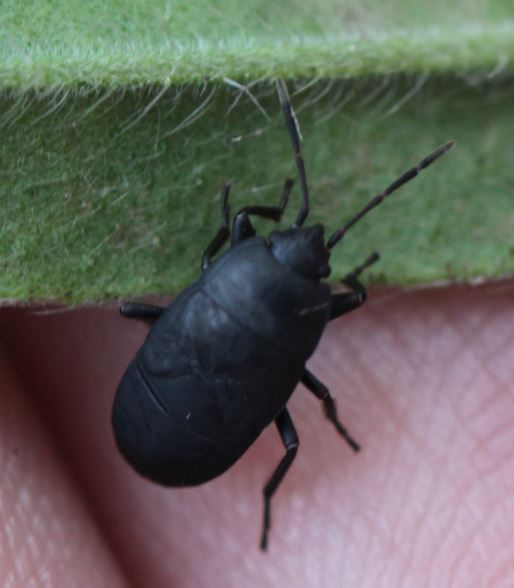

Scientific classification
- Kingdom: Animalia
- Phylum: Arthropoda
- Clade: Pancrustacea
- Class: Insecta
- Order: Hemiptera
- Suborder: Heteroptera
- Family: Rhyparochromidae
- Subfamily: Rhyparochrominae
- Tribe: Rhyparochromini
- Genus: Aellopus
- Species: A. atratus

Binomial name
- Aellopus atratus (Goeze, 1778)

= Aellopus atratus =

Species of dirt-colored seed bug

Aellopus atratus is a species of dirt-colored seed bug in the family Rhyparochromidae, found in Europe and western Asia.

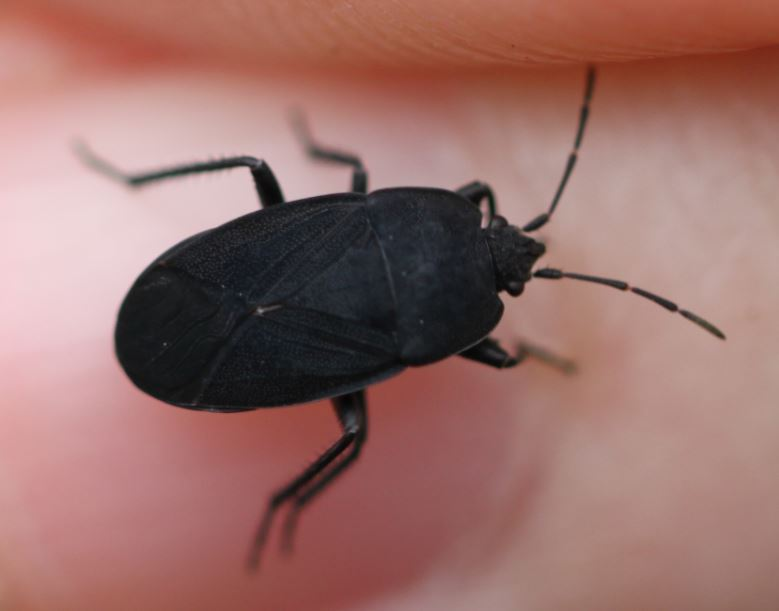
Aellopus atratus, Germany

== Subspecies ==
These three subspecies belong to the species Aellopus atratus:

- Aellopus atratus atratus Goeze, 1778
- Aellopus atratus nitidus (Kolenati, 1856)
- Aellopus atratus opacipennis (Reuter, 1885)
