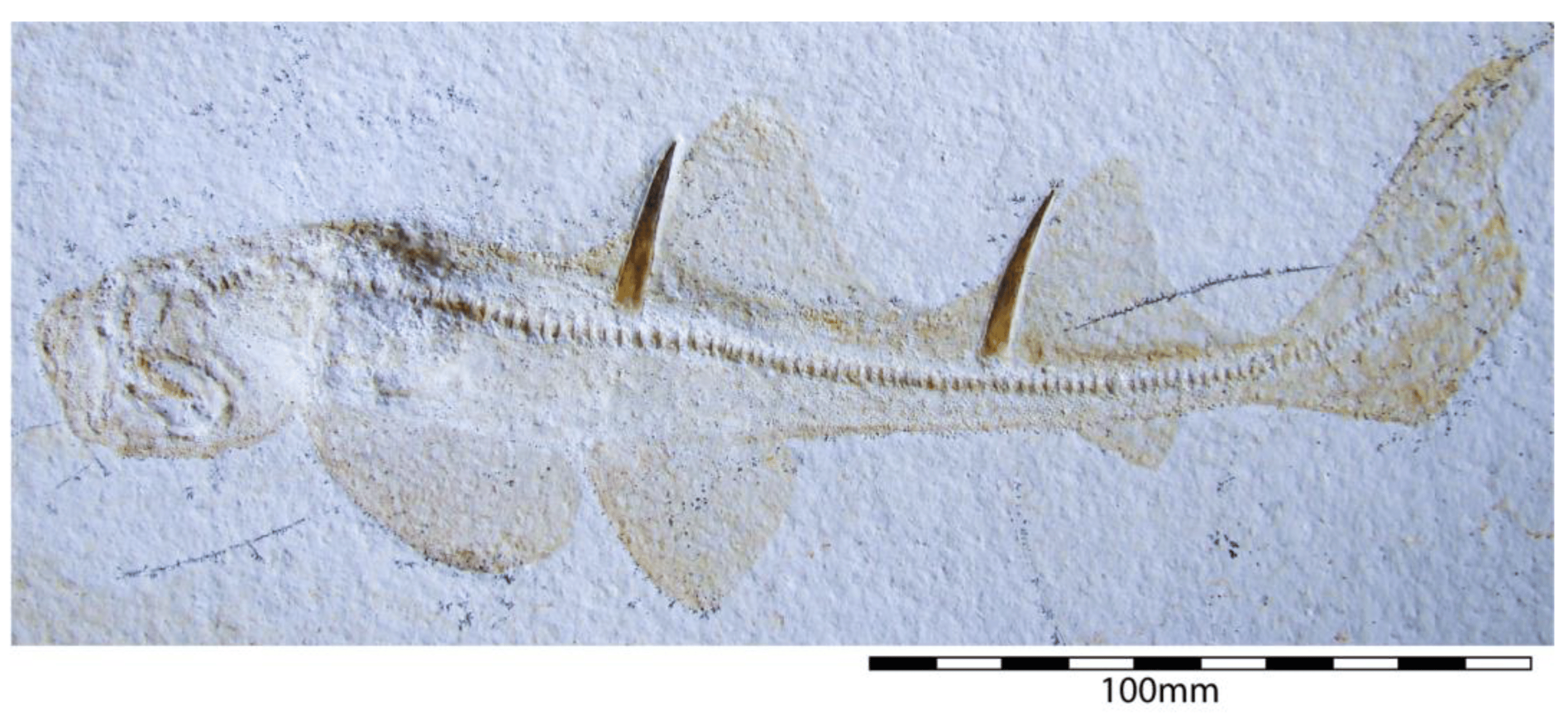
- Holotype specimen of Paracestracion danieli
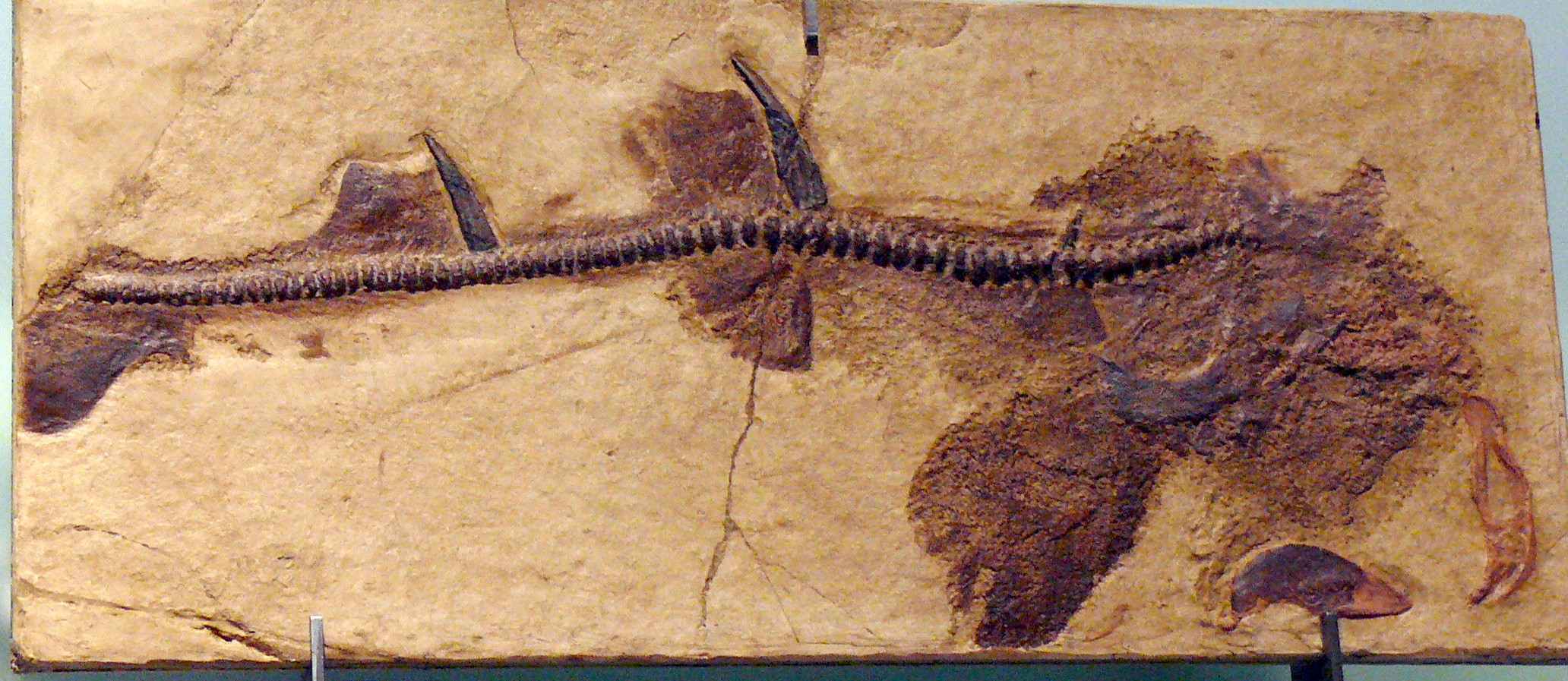
- Paracestracion falcifer fossil from Solnhofen, Germany

Scientific classification
- Kingdom: Animalia
- Phylum: Chordata
- Class: Chondrichthyes
- Subclass: Elasmobranchii
- Division: Selachii
- Order: Heterodontiformes
- Family: †Paracestracionidae
- Genus: †Paracestracion; Koken in Zittel, 1911

Type species
- †Paracestracion falcifer (Wagner, 1858)

Other species
- †P. bellis Underwood & Ward, 2004; †P. danieli Slater, 2016; †P. pectinatus Guinot et al., 2014; †P. sarstedtensis (Thies, 1983); †P. viohli Kriwet, 2008

Synonyms
- Cestracion falcifer Wagner, 1857; Heterodontus sarstedtensis Thies, 1983

= Paracestracion =

Paracestracion Temporal range: Early Jurassic-Early Cretaceous, 182.7–132.9 Ma

Extinct genus of sharks

Paracestracion is an extinct genus of heterodontiform sharks from Early Jurassic to Early Cretaceous-aged rocks of England, France, Germany and Luxembourg. The genus was first described in 1911 by Ernst Hermann Friedrich von Koken in Karl Alfred von Zittel.

The genus contains several Late Jurassic species known from well preserved full body remains, which show that it differs from the living bullhead sharks in the placement of the pelvic girdle and fins, as well as by having a shorter skull.

== Taxonomy ==
Recent studies have classified it into its own family, Paracestracionidae.

At maximum, the genus contains five species: P. bellis from the Bathonian of England, the type species P. falcifer from the Tithonian and Kimmeridgian of Weymouth, England and Solnhofen, Germany, which was originally named as a species of Cestracion (now seen as a synonym of Heterodontus) in 1857 by Johann Andreas Wagner, P. sarstedtensis, originally classified as a species of Heterodontus, from the Toarcian and Aalenian of Germany, and P. viohli from the Tithonian-aged Painten Formation of Germany, with a sixth indeterminate species known from the Toarcian-aged Variabilis layer of the La Couche à Crassum (part of the larger Posidonia Shale) of Luxembourg. P. pectinatus from the Early Cretaceous (Valanginian) of France has been described on the basis of isolated teeth.
