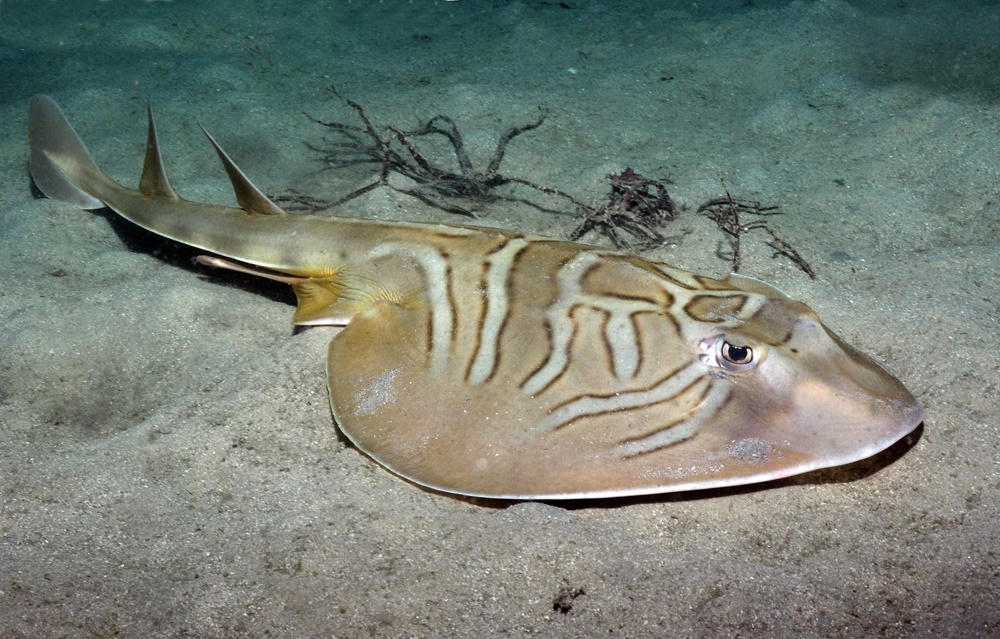
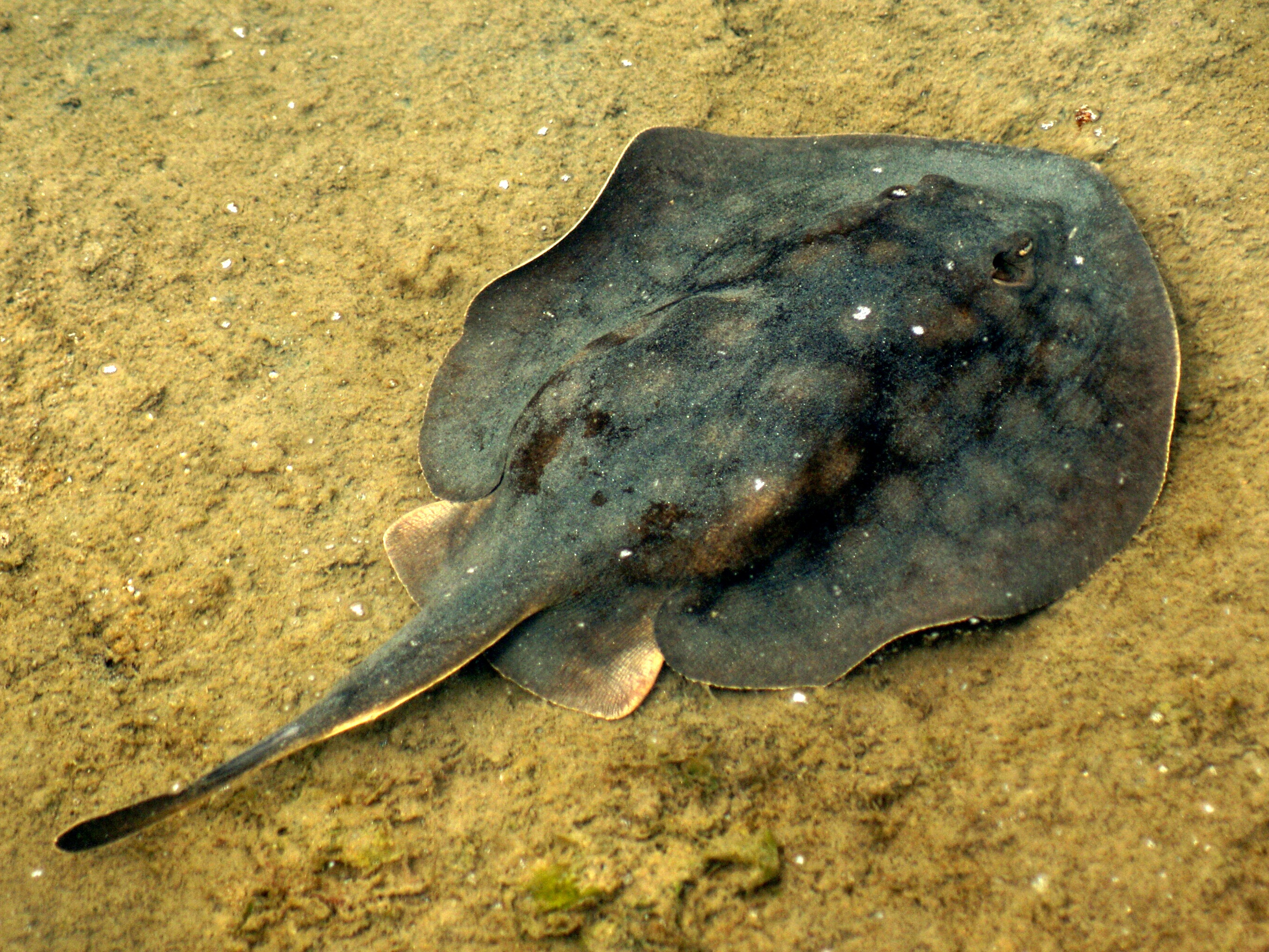
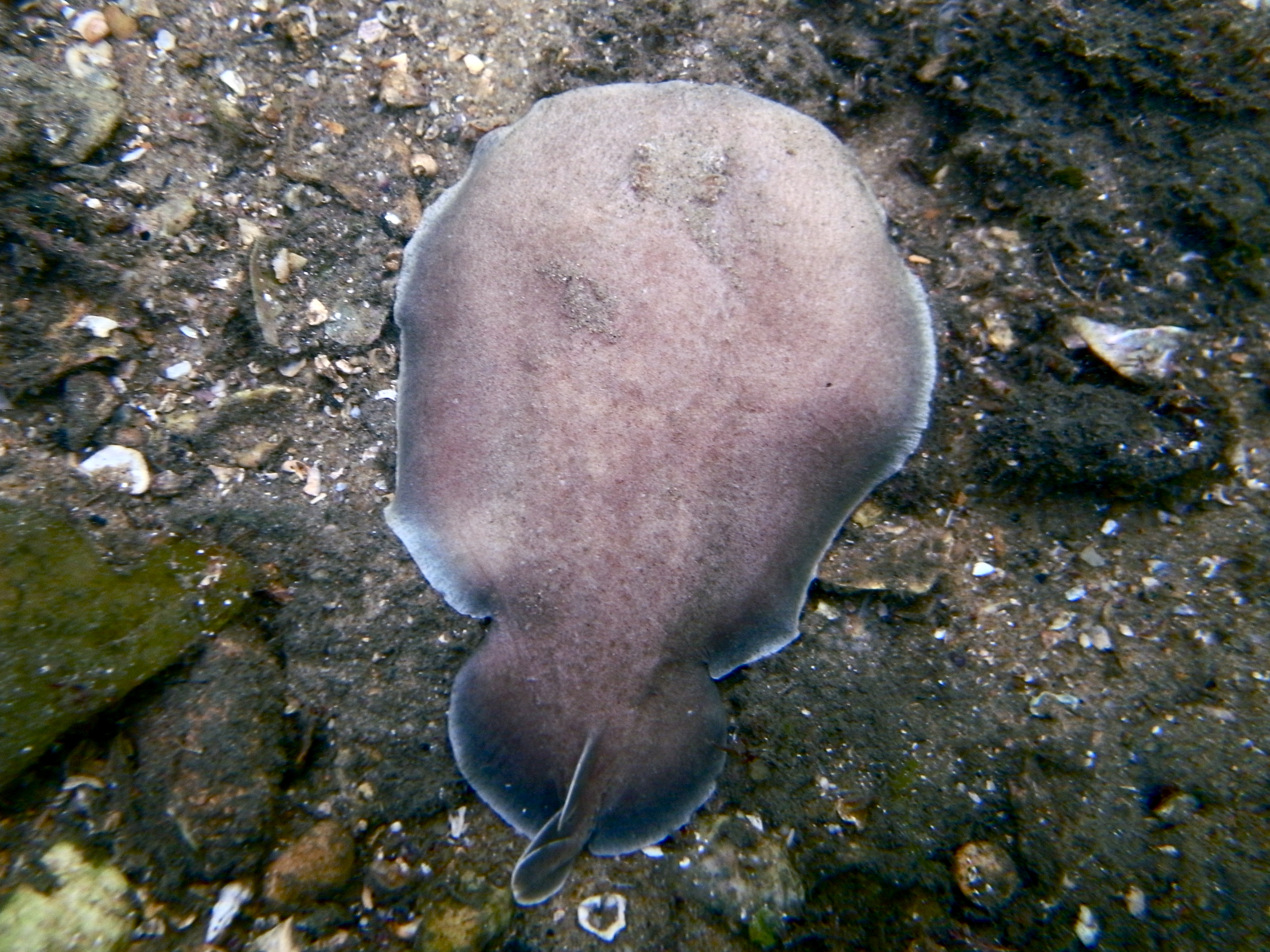
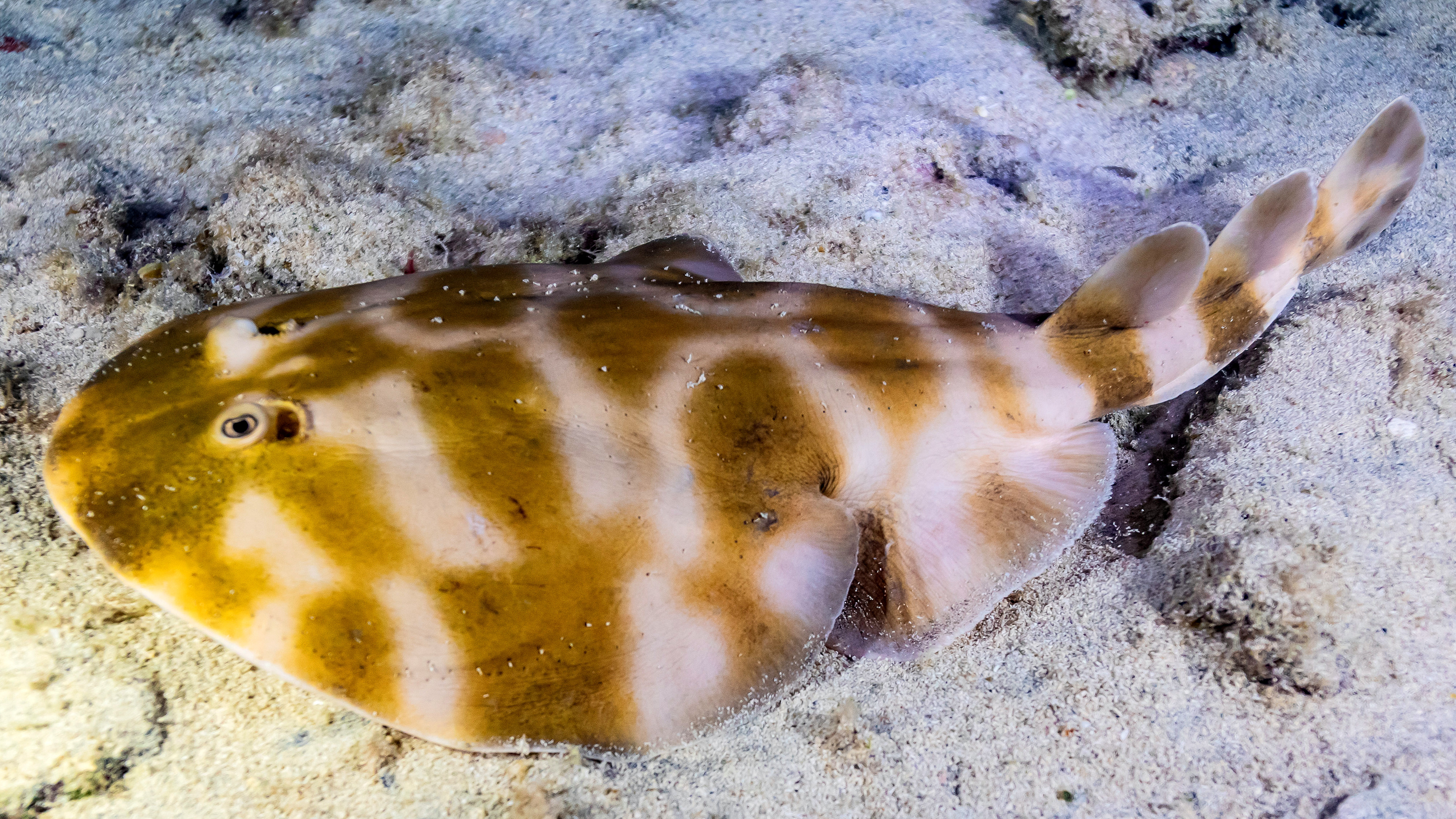
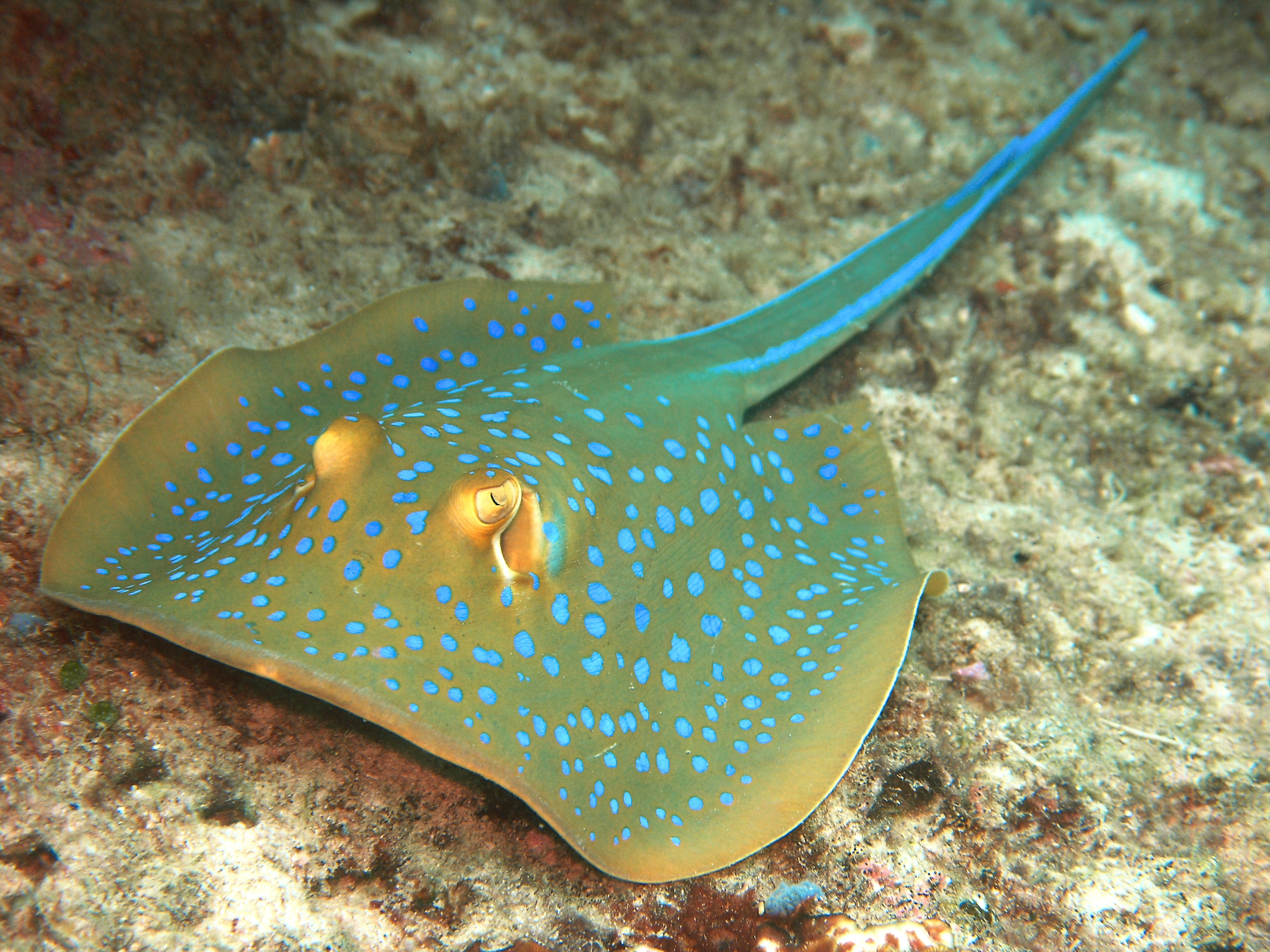
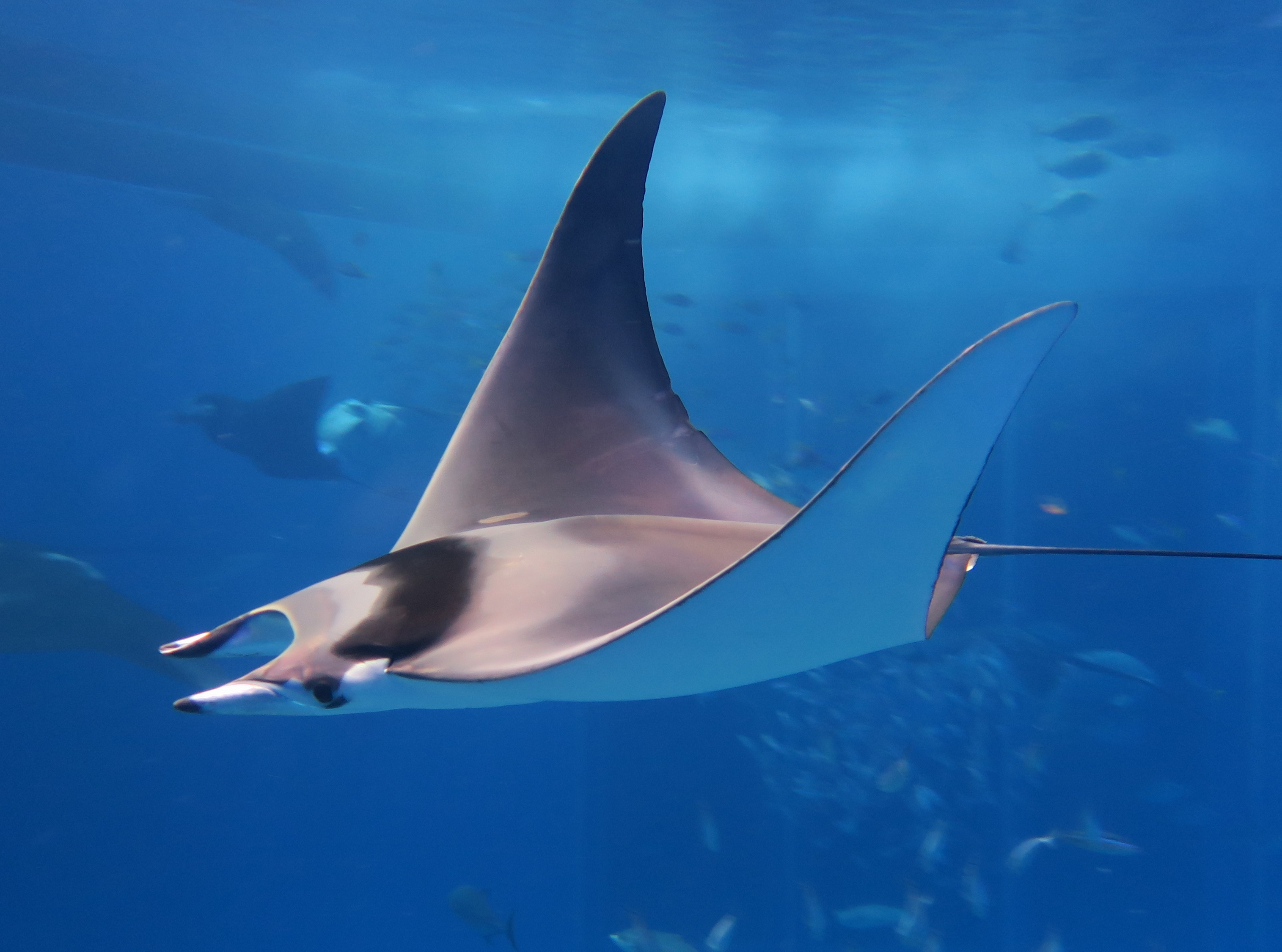
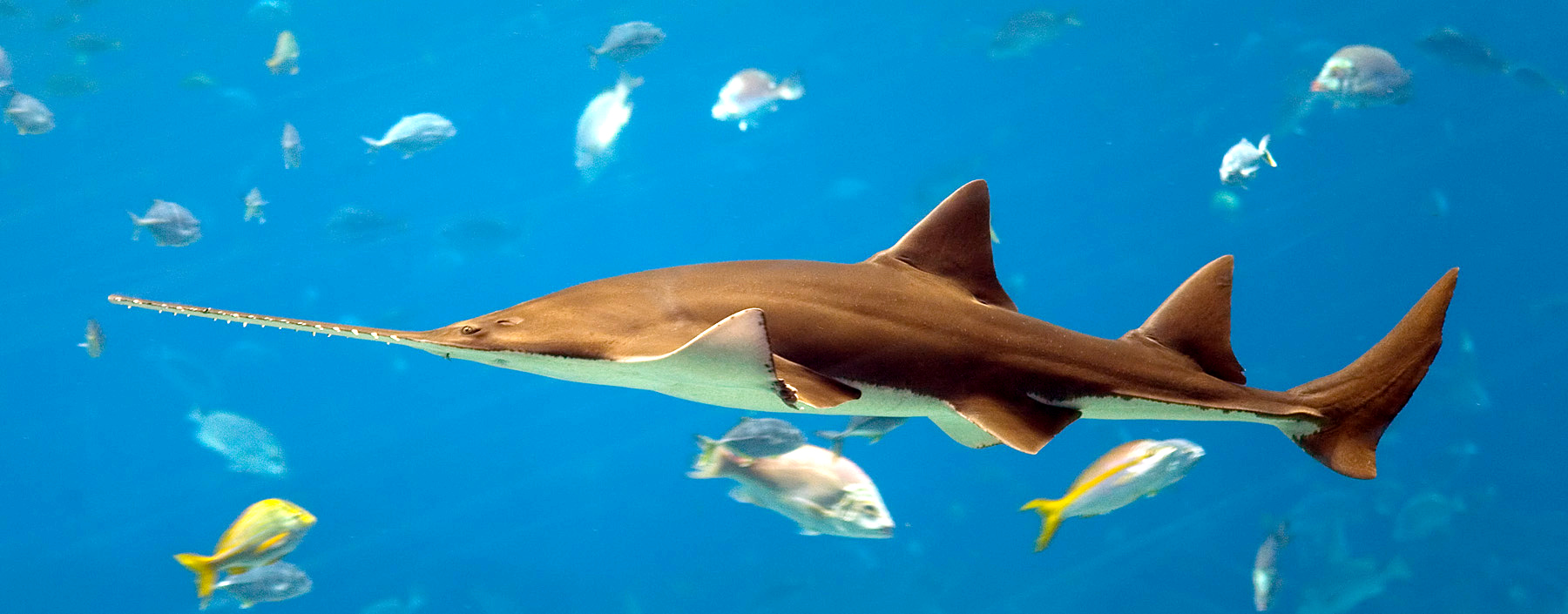
- Eastern fiddler ray Round stingray Spotted eagle ray Common torpedo Coffin ray Brazilian electric ray Bluespotted ribbontail ray Spinetail mobula Largetooth sawfish

Scientific classification
- Kingdom: Animalia
- Phylum: Chordata
- Class: Chondrichthyes
- Subclass: Elasmobranchii
- Division: Batomorphi; Compagno, 1973

Orders
- †Apolithabatiformes; Myliobatiformes; Rajiformes; Rhinopristiformes; Torpediniformes

Synonyms
- Batoidimorpha; Batoidea

= Batomorphi =

Batomorphs Temporal range: Early Jurassic–Present

Division of cartilaginous fishes

Batomorphi is a division of cartilaginous fishes, commonly known as rays; this taxon is sometimes considered as the superorder Batoidea, but the 5th edition of Fishes of the World classifies it as the division Batomorphi. Batomorphi, along with the shark division Selachii, both compose the subclass Elasmobranchii. Rays are the most speciose of cartilaginous fishes groups, with well over 600 species in 26 families. Rays are distinguished by their flattened bodies, enlarged pectoral fins that are fused to the head, and gill slits that are placed on their ventral surfaces.

== Description ==
=== Anatomy ===
Like sharks, Batomorphs are cartilaginous fish (Chondrichthyes), meaning they have a boneless skeleton made of a tough, elastic cartilage. Most batomorphs are dorsoventrally flattened, with a mantle-like body, though the guitarfishes and sawfishes are somewhat less flattened, while most sharks have a spindle-shaped body. Many species of batomorph have developed their pectoral fins into broad flat appendages often referred to as the wings. The anal fin is absent. The eyes and spiracles are located on top of the head. Bottom-dwelling batomorphs breathe by taking water in through the spiracles, rather than through the mouth as most fish do, and passing it outward through the gills, whose openings or gill slits lie under the pectoral fins on the underside, whereas a shark's are on the sides of the head. Most batomorphs have five ventral gill slits, but the Hexatrygonidae have six.

Batomorphs have a ventrally located mouth and can considerably protrude their upper jaw (palatoquadrate cartilage) away from the cranium to capture prey. The jaws have euhyostylic type suspension, which relies completely on the hyomandibular cartilages for support. Most batomorphs have developed heavy, rounded teeth for crushing the shells of bottom-dwelling species, such as snails, clams, oysters, crustaceans, and some fish, depending on the species. Manta rays feed on plankton using dense gill rakers to capture them.

Comparison of Elasmobranch fish
Characteristic	Sharks	Guitarfish	Rays
Image			
Shape	laterally compressed spindle	dorsoventrally compressed (flattened) disc	
Habitat	Usually pelagic surface feeders, though carpet sharks are demersal bottom feeders	Often demersal with some pelagic behavior	usually demersal bottom feeders
Eyes	Typically at the side of the head, though benthic forms may have dorsally oriented eyes	Mostly on top of the head	
Spiracles	not always present	always present	
Gill openings	on the sides	ventral (underneath)	
Pectoral fins	distinct	not distinct; blends with the main body	
Tail	Notable caudal fin on muscular tail.		Variable; may have shark-like tail, but many species have finless, whip-like tails, and some have no apparent tail.
Locomotion	Swim by moving their tail (caudal fin) from side to side		Swim by flapping their pectoral fins like wings

=== Habitat ===
Most species live on the sea floor, in a variety of geographical regions – mainly in coastal waters, although some live in deep waters to at least 3,000 metres (9,800 ft). Most batomorphs have a cosmopolitan distribution, preferring tropical and subtropical marine environments, although there are temperate and cold-water species. Only a few species, like manta rays, live in the open sea, and only a few live in freshwater, while some batomorphs can live in brackish bays and estuaries.

=== Reproduction ===
As is characteristic of elasmobranchs, batomorphs undergo internal fertilization. Internal fertilization is advantageous to batomorphs as it conserves sperm, does not expose eggs to consumption by predators, and ensures that all the energy involved in reproduction is retained and not lost to the environment. All skates and some rays are oviparous (egg laying) while other rays are ovoviviparous, meaning that they give birth to young which develop in a womb but without involvement of a placenta.

The eggs of oviparous skates are laid in leathery egg cases that are commonly known as mermaid's purses and which often wash up empty on beaches in areas where skates are common.

Capture-induced premature birth and abortion (collectively called capture-induced parturition) occurs frequently in sharks and rays when fished. Capture-induced parturition is rarely considered in fisheries management despite being shown to occur in at least 12% of live bearing sharks and rays (88 species to date).

== Evolution ==
Batomorphs belong to the ancient lineage of cartilaginous fishes. Fossil denticles (tooth-like scales in the skin) resembling those of today's chondrichthyans date at least as far back as the Ordovician, with the oldest unambiguous fossils of cartilaginous fish dating from the middle Devonian. A clade within this diverse family, the Neoselachii, emerged by the Triassic, with the best-understood neoselachian fossils dating from the Jurassic. The oldest confirmed ray is Antiquaobatis, from the Pliensbachian of Germany. The clade is represented today by sharks, sawfish, rays and skates.

=== Classification ===
Molecular evidence refutes the hypothesis that skates and rays are derived sharks. The monophyly of the skates, the stingrays, and the electric rays has long been generally accepted. Along with Rhinopristiformes, these comprise the four traditionally accepted major batomorph lineages, as in Nelson's 2006 Fishes of the World. However, the exact phylogeny of the major batomorph lineages, internally and with respect to one another, has been subject to diverse treatments. The following cladogram is based on a comprehensive morphological assessment of batomorph phylogeny published in 2004:

- Chondrichthyes
  - Holocephali (incl. Chimaera)
  - Elasmobranchii
    - Selachimorpha (Sharks)
    - Batoidea
      - Torpediniformes
      - - Rhinopristiformes
        - - Rajiformes
          - Myliobatiformes

However, a 2011 study significantly reevaluated the phylogeny of batomorphs, using nuclear and mitochondrial DNA from 37 taxa, representing almost all recognized families and all of the traditional four major lineages. This is a far more numerous and diverse set of sample taxa than in any previous study, producing findings reflected in the cladogram below.

- Chondrichthyes
  - Holocephali (incl. Chimaera)
  - Elasmobranchii
    - Selachimorpha (Sharks)
    - Batoidea
      - Rajiformes (Skates)
      - - - Platyrhinidae (Thornbacks)
          - Torpediniformes (Electric rays)
        - - "Guitarfishes 1" (Trygonorrhinidae)
          - - "Guitarfishes 2" (incl. Pristidae (Sawfishes))
            - - Zanobatidae (Panrays)
              - Myliobatoidei (Stingrays)

This study strongly confirmed the traditionally accepted internal monophyly of skates, stingrays, and electric rays. It also recovered panrays as sister to the stingrays, as older morphological analyses had suggested. However, it found the Rhinopristiformes, including the sawfishes and various "guitarfishes", to be paraphyletic, comprising two distinct clades. Referred to as "Guitarfishes 1" and "Guitarfishes 2", the former contains only the Trygonorrhinidae, while the latter contains the remainder of Rhinopristiformes (the families Glaucostegidae, Pristidae, Rhinidae, and Rhinobatidae). In addition, while traditional phylogenies often find electric rays to be the basalmost batomorphs, followed by the Rhinopristiformes, this analysis finds a polytomy between skates, electric rays, and thornbacks at the base of Batomorphi, with weak support for skates being the actual most basal lineage, followed by a clade uniting the electric rays and thornbacks.

The Mesozoic Sclerorhynchoidea were long considered to be basal or incertae sedis; they show features of the Rajiformes but have snouts resembling those of sawfishes. Though considered to be the sister group to sawfishes for a time, they are now considered true skates (Rajiformes).

The following cladograms are derived from phylogenetic analyses taken from a 2022 study of batomorph morphology by Villalobos-Segura and colleagues;

Based on parsimony

- Euselachii
  - †Hybodontiformes
  - Elasmobranchii
    - Selachimorpha
    - Batoidea
      - - †Belemnobatis
        - - †Spathobatis
          - - †Asterodermus
            - †Kimmerobatis
      - - Rhinopristiformes
        - - Rajiformes
          - - Torpediniformes
            - Myliobatiformes

Based on maximum likelihood

- Euselachii
  - †Hybodontiformes
  - Elasmobranchii
    - Selachimorpha
    - Batoidea
      - †Spathobatis
      - - †Belemnobatis
        - - †Asterodermus
          - †Kimmerobatis
          - - Rajiformes
            - - Rhinopristiformes
              - - Torpediniformes
                - Myliobatiformes

=== Subdivisions ===
Order	Image	Common name	Family	Genera	Species					Comment
Order	Image	Common name	Family	Genera	Total					Comment
Myliobatiformes		Stingrays and relatives	10	29	223	1	16	33	1	(Note: Myliobatiformes include stingrays, butterfly rays, eagle rays, and manta rays. They were formerly included in the order Rajiformes, but more-recent phylogenetic studies have shown that they are a monophyletic group, and that its more-derived members evolved their highly flattened shapes independently of the skates.)
Rajiformes		Skates and relatives	5	36	270	4	12	26		(Note: Rajiformes include skates, guitarfishes, and wedgefishes. They are distinguished by the presence of greatly enlarged pectoral fins, which reach as far forward as the sides of the head, with a generally flattened body. The undulatory pectoral fin motion diagnostic to this taxon is known as rajiform locomotion. The eyes and spiracles are located on the upper surface of the body, and the gill slits on the underside. They have flattened, crushing teeth, and are generally carnivorous. Most species give birth to live young, although some lay eggs inside a protective capsule or mermaid's purse.)
Torpediniformes		Electric rays	4	12	69	2		9		(Note: The electric rays have electric organs in their pectoral fin discs that generate electric current. They are used to immobilize prey and for defense. The current is strong enough to stun humans, and the ancient Greeks and Romans used these fish to treat ailments such as headaches.)
Rhinopristiformes		Shovelnose rays and relatives	1	2	5–7	3–5	2			(Note: The sawfishes are shark-like in form, having tails used for swimming and smaller pectoral fins than most batoids. The pectoral fins are attached above the gills as in all batoids, giving the fishes a broad-headed appearance. They have long, flat snouts with a row of tooth-like projections on either side. The snouts are up to 1.8 metres (6 ft) long, and 30 centimetres (1 ft) wide, and are used for slashing and impaling small fishes and to probe in the mud for embedded animals. Sawfishes can enter freshwater rivers and lakes. Some species reach a total length of 6 metres (20 ft). All species of sawfish are endangered or critically endangered.)
†Apolithabatiformes		Spinorays	1	6	13				13	(Note: Apolithabatiformes is an entirely extinct order of batoids known exclusively from Mesozoic marine deposits, with a stratigraphic range spanning the Late Jurassic to the Early Cretaceous. No living representatives are known. Members are characterized by a dorsoventrally compressed body with broad, well-developed pectoral fin discs and a relatively slender, shark-like tail region. The best-known genus, Asterodermus, is represented by exceptionally preserved specimens from the Solnhofen Limestone of Bavaria, Germany, including material that retains soft-tissue outlines of the pectoral disc. Like other early batoids, members of this order are inferred to have been benthic predators, feeding on small invertebrates and fishes along shallow-marine substrates.)

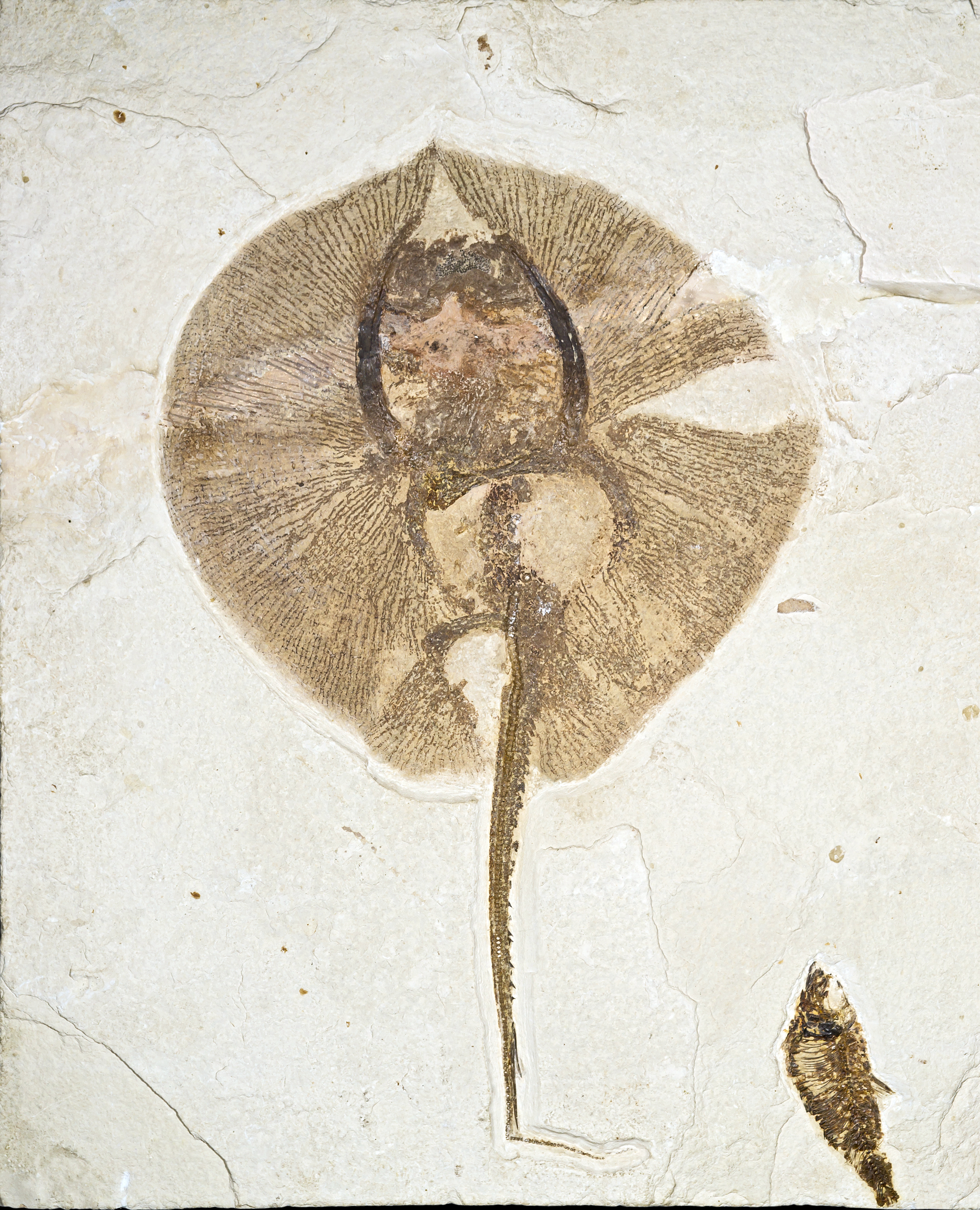
Early Eocene fossil whipray Heliobatis radians

Illustration of various species of Batomorphi by Friedrich Justin Bertuch, 1807

Eschmeyer's Catalog of Fishes classifies the rays as follows:

- Order Torpediniformes
  - Family Platyrhinidae D. S. Jordan, 1923 (thornbacks or fanrays)
  - Family Narkidae Fowler, 1934 (sleeper rays)
  - Family Narcinidae, Gill, 1862 (electric rays)
  - Family Hypnidae Gill, 1862 (coffin rays)
  - Family Torpedinidae Henle 1834 (torpedo electric rays or torpedo rays)
- Order Rhinopristiformes
  - Family Trygonorrhinidae Last, Séret & Naylor, 2016 (fiddler rays or banjo rays)
  - Family Rhinobatidae Bonaparte, 1835 (guitarfishes)
  - Family Rhinidae J. P. Müller & Henle, 1841 (bowmouth guitarfishes or wedgefishes)
  - Family Glaucostegidae Last, Séret & Naylor, 2016 (giant guitarfishes)
  - Family Pristidae Bonaparte, 1835 (sawfishes)
- Order Rajiformes
  - Family Rajidae Blainville, 1816 (hardnose skates)
  - Family Arhynchobatidae Fowler, 1934 (softnose skates or longtail skates)
  - Family Gurgesiellidae de Buen, 1959 (pygmy skates)
  - Family Anacanthobatidae von Bonde & Swart, 1923 (legskates or smooth skates)
- Order Myliobatiformes
  - Family Zanobatidae Fowler. 1934 (panrays)
  - Family Hexatrygonidae Heemstra & M. M. Smith, 1980 (sixgill stingrays)
  - Family Dasyatidae D. S. Jordan & Gilbert, 1879 (whiptail stingrays)
    - Subfamily Dasyatinae D. S. Jordan & Gilbert, 1879 (stingrays)
    - Subfamily Neotrygoninae Castelnau, 1873 (shortsnout stingrays)
    - Subfamily Urogymninae Gray, 1851 (whiprays)
    - Subfamily Hypolophinae Stromer, 1910 (cowtail stingrays)
  - Family Potamotrygonidae Garman, 1877 (neotropical stingrays)
    - Subfamily Styracurinae Carvalho, Loboda & da Silva 2016 (whiptail stingrays)
    - Subfamily Potamotrygoninae Garman 1877 (river stingrays)
  - Family Urotrygonidae McEachran, Dunn & Miyake, 1996 (American round stingrays)
  - Family Gymnuridae Fowler, 1934 (butterfly rays)
  - Family Plesiobatidae K. Nishida, 1990 (deepwater stingrays or giant stingarees)
  - Family Urolophidae J. P. Müller & Henle 1841 (round stingrays or stingarees)
  - Family Aetobatidae Agassiz, 1858 (pelagic eagle rays)
  - Family Myliobatidae Bonaparte, 1835 (eagle rays)
  - Family Rhinopteridae D. S, Jordan & Evermann, 1896 (cownose rays)
  - Family Mobulidae Gill, 1893 (mantas or devil rays)

== Conservation ==
According to a 2021 study in Nature, the number of oceanic sharks and rays has declined globally by 71% over the preceding 50 years, jeopardising "the health of entire ocean ecosystems as well as food security for some of the world's poorest countries". Overfishing has increased the global extinction risk of these species to the point where three-quarters are now threatened with extinction. This is notably the case in the Mediterranean Sea - most impacted by unregulated fishing - where a recent international survey of the Mediterranean Science Commission concluded that only 38 species of rays and skates still subsisted.

== See also ==
- Rhenanida – similarly shaped placoderm fish

== Bibliography ==
- McEachran, J.D.; Dunn, K.A.; Miyake, T. (1996). "Interrelationships of the batoid fishes (Chondrichthyes: Batoidea)". Interrelationships of Fishes. Academic Press.
