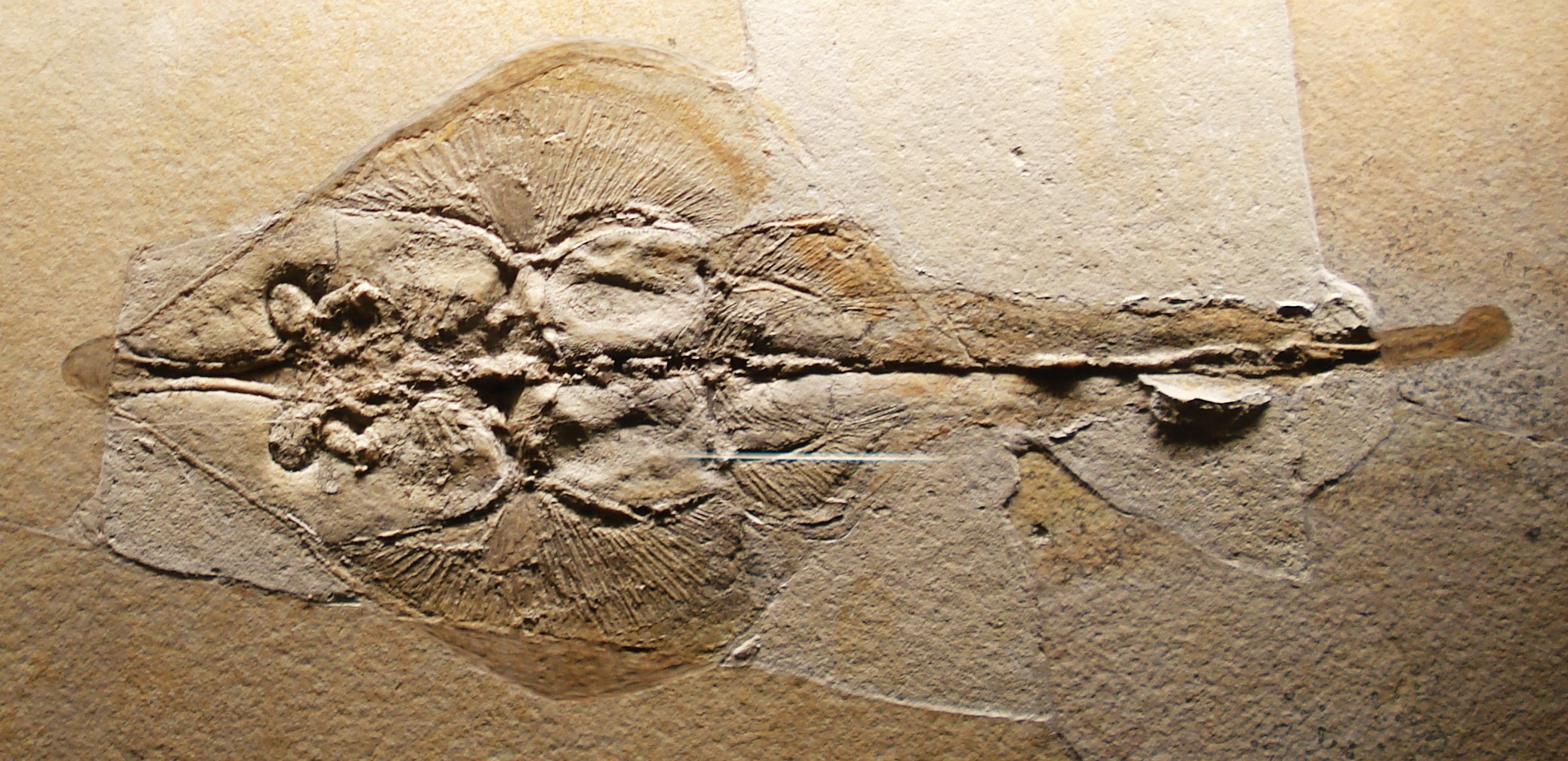
- Fossil from the Tithonian of Germany

Scientific classification
- Kingdom: Animalia
- Phylum: Chordata
- Class: Chondrichthyes
- Subclass: Elasmobranchii
- Division: Batomorphi
- Order: †Apolithabatiformes
- Family: †Asterodermidae
- Genus: †Asterodermus; Agassiz, 1836
- Species: †A. platypterus

Binomial name
- †Asterodermus platypterus Agassiz, 1836

= Asterodermus =

Asterodermus Temporal range: Late Jurassic, Tithonian

Extinct genus of rays

Asterodermus (from Greek: ἀστήρ aster, 'star' and Greek: δέρμα dérma, 'skin') is an extinct genus of asterodermid rays from the Jurassic period. A single species, A. platypterus, is described. It is known mainly from the early Tithonian of Germany, including the famous Lagerstätte site of Solnhofen. Additionally, Asterodermus scales have been found among articulated skeletons of neoselachians from the Tithonian of southern Germany.
