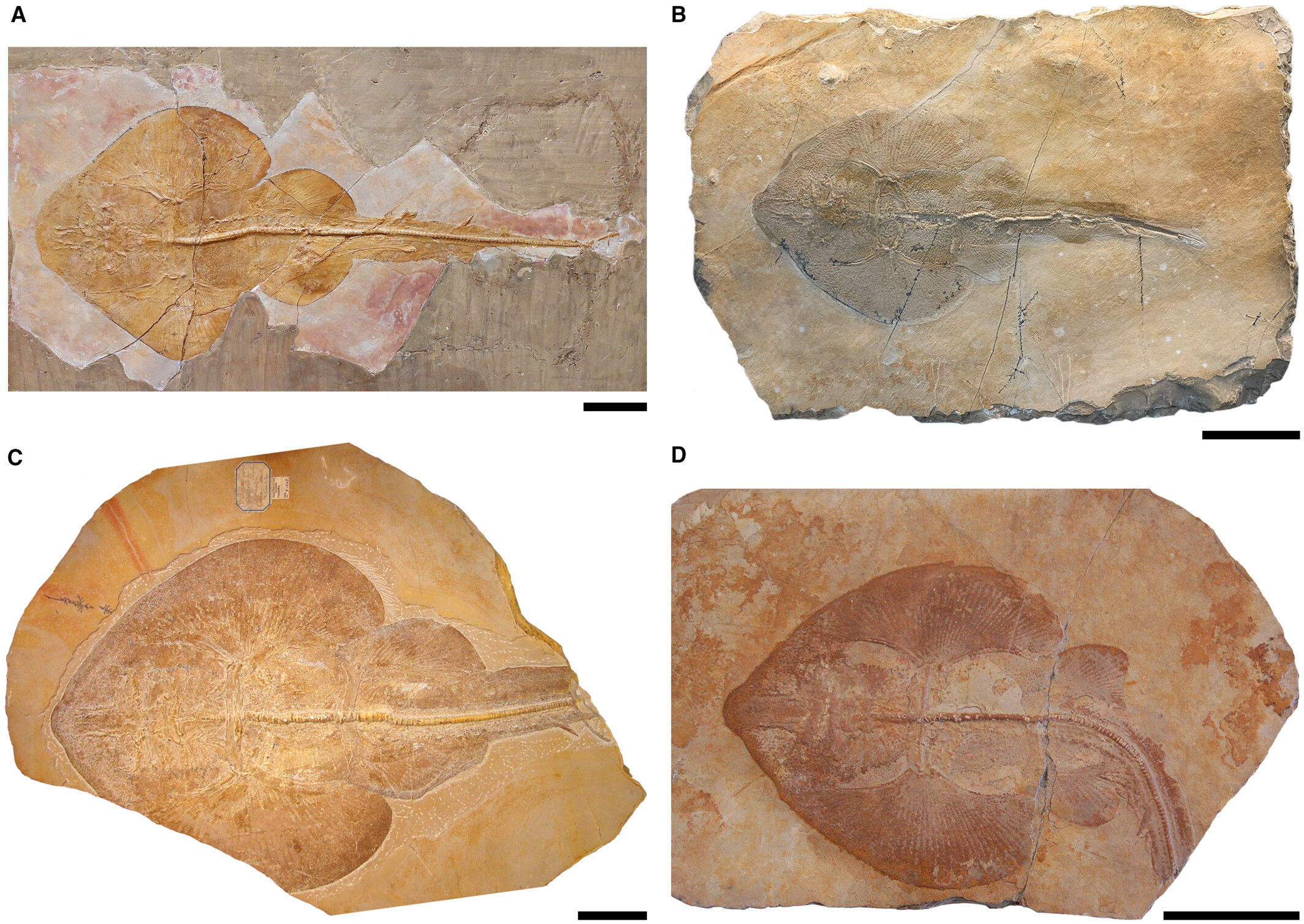
- Several specimens including the holotype (D)

Scientific classification
- Kingdom: Animalia
- Phylum: Chordata
- Class: Chondrichthyes
- Subclass: Elasmobranchii
- Order: †Apolithabatiformes
- Family: †Asterodermidae
- Genus: †Belemnobatis; Thiollière, 1852

Type species
- †Belemnobatis sismondae Thiollière, 1852

Other species
- †B. aominensis; †B. kermacki; †B. moorbergensis; †B. noviodunumensis; †B. stahli; †B. variablis; †B. werneri

= Belemnobatis =

Belemnobatis Temporal range: Jurassic–Cretaceous

Extinct genus of rays

Belemnobatis is an extinct genus of rays from the Late Jurassic. It has been regarded as related to other Jurassic rays in the family Asterodermidae. It is possible this genus is a wastebasket taxon. It is known from many sites of both Jurassic and Cretaceous age throughout Europe and a single Asian occurrence in the middle Jurassic of Thailand.
