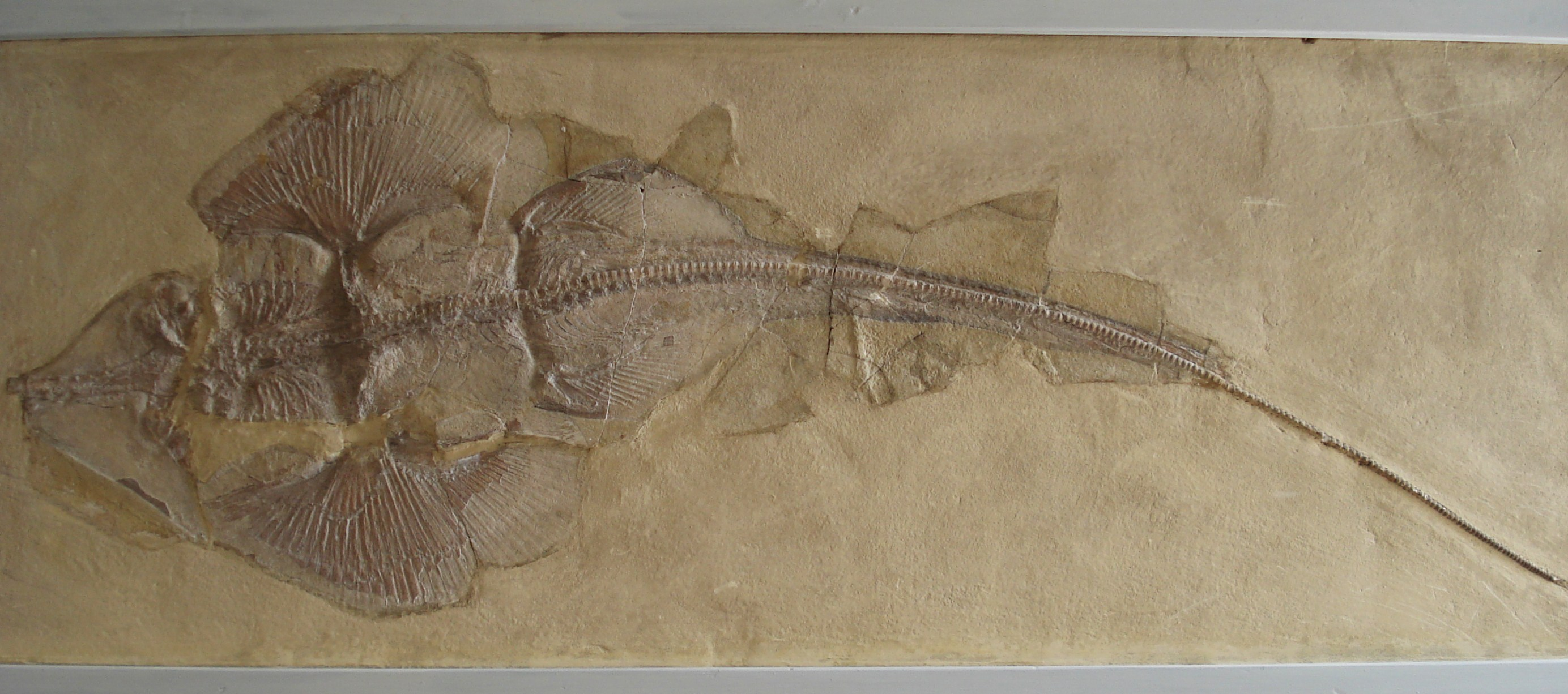
- Spathobatis bugesiacus in the Paläontologische Museum München

Scientific classification
- Kingdom: Animalia
- Phylum: Chordata
- Class: Chondrichthyes
- Subclass: Elasmobranchii
- Order: †Apolithabatiformes
- Family: †Asterodermidae
- Genus: †Spathobatis; Thiollière 1848

= Spathobatis =

Spathobatis Temporal range: Late Jurassic

Extinct genus of cartilaginous fishes

Spathobatis (from Greek: σπᾰ́θη spáthē, 'blade' and Greek: βατίς batis 'ray') is an extinct genus of rays in the family Asterodermidae from the Jurassic period of Europe.

Spathobatis had a body similar to that of a modern guitarfish, being highly flattened and widened, adapting the creature for a life on the ocean floor. Although it is one of the earliest known fossil rays, it already resembled modern forms in a number of ways. Like them, its eyes and spiracles were located atop the head, its mouth and gill slits were positioned on the underside of the body, and it had greatly expanded pectoral fins for swimming.

Distinctive features of Spathobatis included flattened teeth, suitable for eating shellfish, and an elongated snout that was presumably used to probe for food on the muddy sea floor.
