= Paleobiota of the Solnhofen Limestone =

Fossil-bearing formation in Germany

Solnhofen Limestone
- Stratigraphic range: Kimmeridgian-Tithonian
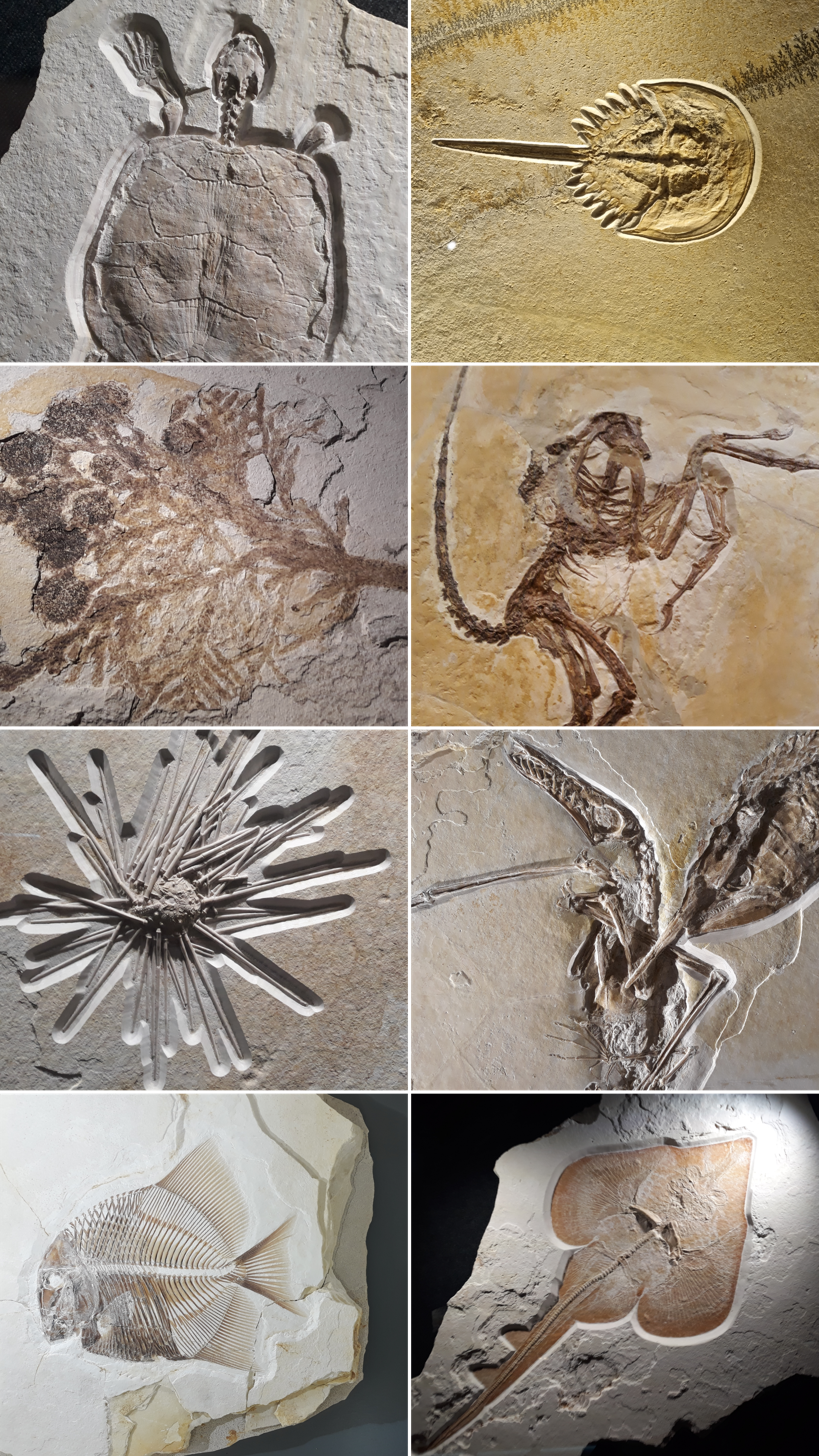
- Type: Geological formation
- Underlies: Usseltal Formation
- Overlies: Treuchtlingen Formation

Lithology
- Primary: Lithographic limestone
- Other: Slate, Dolomite, Flint

Location
- Region: Bavaria
- Country: Germany

Type section
- Named for: Solnhofen
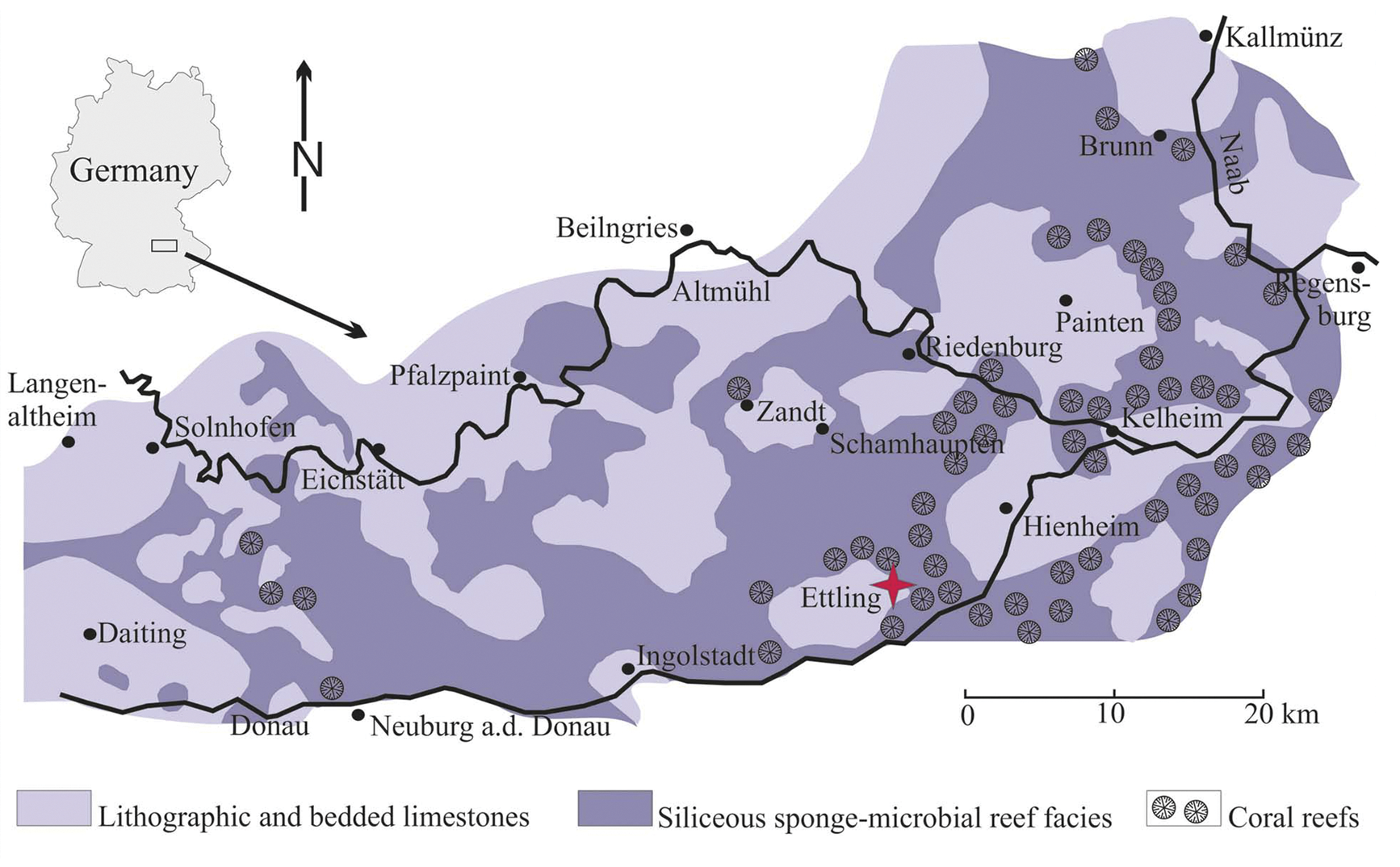
- Facies map of the Solnhofen Archipelago of southern Germany

The Solnhofen Limestone or Solnhofen Plattenkalk is a collective term for multiple Late Jurassic lithographic limestones in southeastern Germany, which is famous for its well-preserved fossil flora and fauna dating to the late Jurassic (Kimmeridgian-Tithonian). The paleoenvironment is also often referred to as the Solnhofen Archipelago. The Solnhofen Archipelago was located at the northern edge of the Tethys Ocean as part of a shallow epicontinental sea and is firmly a part of the Mediterranean realm.

== Chondrichthyes ==
Color key: Taxon / Reclassified taxon / Taxon falsely reported as present / Dubious taxon or junior synonym / Ichnotaxon / Ootaxon / Morphotaxon

Notes
Uncertain or tentative taxa are in small text
~~crossed out~~ taxa are discredited.

=== Holocephali ===
Genus	Species	Locality	Formation	Material	Notes	Images
Chimaeropsis	C. paradoxa	Solnhofen, Eichstätt	Altmühltal Formation	Fragmentary cranial remains and one complete specimen	Holotype destroyed in WW2 air raid	
Ischyodus	I. egertoni	Eichstätt, Wattendorf	Altmühltal Formation, Torleite Formation	Multiple complete specimens		
Elasmodectes	E. avitus	Eichstätt, Blumenberg, Wintershof	Altmühltal Formation	Multiple complete specimens		
Chimaerotheca	C. schernfeldensis	Schernfeld			Egg capsules of an unknown chimaera	

=== Elasmobranchii ===
Genus	Species	Locality	Formation	Material	Notes	Images
Hybodus (Egertonodus?)	H. fraasi	Solnhofen	Altmühltal Formation	Almost complete but poorly preserved specimen		
Asteracanthus	A. ornatissimus	Solnhofen	Altmühltal Formation	Single almost complete specimen of a 2 meter long female		
Strophodus	S. sp	Mühlheim	Mörnsheim Formation	Articulated set of jaws and teeth		

=== Neoselachii ===
Genus	Species	Locality	Formation	Material	Notes	Images
Georgaello	G. elongata	Kelheim	Altmühltal Formation	Partial holomorphic specimen		
Georgaello	G. wagneri	Solnhofen? (or Pappenheim or Eichstätt?)	Altmühltal Formation	Partial holomorphic specimen		
Synechodus	S. ungeri	Solnhofen	Altmühltal Formation	Almost complete skeleton and isolated teeth		
Paraorthacodus	P. jurensis	Haunsfeld, Blumenberg, Schernfeld, Solnhofen	Altmühltal Formation	Several complete specimens		
Macrourogaleus	M. hassei	Eichstätt	Altmühltal Formation	Several complete specimens		

=== Batomorphi ===
Genus	Species	Locality	Formation	Material	Notes	Images
Asterodermus	A. platypterus	Solnhofen, Kelheim, Blumenberg, Birkhof	Altmühltal Formation	Several complete specimens	Medium-sized asterodermid measuring up to 60 centimetres (24 in) in length	
Apolithabatis	A. seioma	Painten	Torleite Formation	One complete specimen	Large asterodermid measuring 120 centimetres (47 in) long with a heart-shaped disk	
Aellopobatis	A. bavarica	Solnhofen, Eichstätt, Zandt, Kelheim, Langenaltheim	Altmühltal Formation, Painten Formation	Several complete specimens	A large asterodermid reaching up to 170 centimetres (67 in) long, characterized by its exceptionally long rostrum	
Spathobatis	S. bugesiacus	Solnhofen, Eichstätt, Zandt, Kelheim, Langenaltheim	Altmühltal Formation, Painten Formation	Several complete specimens	All Solnhofen specimens referred to Spathobatis have been reassigned to the genus Aellopobatis.	
Rajitheca	R. sp.			Several specimens in private collections	Egg capsules of batomorphs	

=== Heterodontiformes ===
Genus	Species	Locality	Formation	Material	Notes	Images
Paracestracion	P. falcifer	Solnhofen? Eichstätt	Altmühltal Formation	Complete skeleton, potentially more specimens		
Paracestracion	P. viohli	Schamhaupten	Torleite Formation	Single incomplete skeleton		
Paracestracion	P. danieli	Eichstätt	Altmühltal Formation	Single incomplete skeleton		
Heterodontus	H. zitteli	Eichstätt	Altmühltal Formation	Single complete skeleton lacking teeth, several other specimens may be referrable		

=== Orectolobiformes ===
Genus	Species	Locality	Formation	Material	Notes	Images
Phorcynis	P. catulina	Eichstätt, Zandt, Blumenberg	Altmühltal Formation	Several skeletons		
Palaeorectolobus	P. agomphius	Kelheim	Altmühltal Formation	One incomplete specimen		

=== Carcharhiniformes ===
Genus	Species	Locality	Formation	Material	Notes	Images
Bavariscyllium	B. tischlingeri	Eichstätt	Altmühltal Formation	Several complete specimens		
Palaeoscyllium	P. formosum	Solnhofen	Altmühltal Formation	Several complete specimens		
Scyliorhinotheca	S. sp				egg capsule of a catshark	

=== Lamniformes ===
Genus	Species	Locality	Formation	Material	Notes	Images
Palaeocarcharias	P. stromeri	Eichstätt, Kelheim, Solnhofen	Altmühltal Formation	Several complete specimens	One of the oldest known lamniiformes, though more reminiscent in appearance to modern carpet sharks	

=== Hexanchiformes ===
Genus	Species	Locality	Formation	Material	Notes	Images
Crassodontidanus	C. serratus	Eichstätt, Daiting	Altmühltal Formation	Isolated Teeth	A crassodontid	
Notidanoides	N. muensteri	Eichstätt, Daiting	Altmühltal Formation	Isolated teeth, one almost complete skeleton was presumably destroyed during WW2. Another incomplete skeleton of the genus is known from the Nusplingen limestone	Large crassodontid with a wide distribution, being also known from England, France and Russia	Isolated Tooth of Notidanoides
Archaeogracilidens	A. macer	Solnhofen, Mühlheim	Altmühltal Formation, Mörnsheim Formation	Isolated teeth and two fragmentary disarticulated skeletons	Orthacodid previously referred to by the genus "Sphenodus"; however, the holotype teeth designated for Sphenodus are undiagnostic, which is why a new genus was established for the remains from Solnhofen and Nusplingen. The species "S." nitidus is regarded as a synonym of A. macer	

=== Squatiniformes ===
Genus	Species	Locality	Formation	Material	Notes	Images
Pseudorhina	P. acanthoderma		Altmühltal Formation	Several complete specimens	An angelshark reaching up to 140 cm in length. Occurrence of this taxon in the Solnhofen Archipelago is uncertain, all definitive representatives of this species come from the Nusplingen Limestone	
Pseudorhina	P. alifera	Eichstätt	Altmühltal Formation	Several complete specimens	An angelshark reaching up to 60 cm in length	

=== Other ===
Genus	Species	Locality	Formation	Material	Notes	Images
Protospinax	P. annectans	Solnhofen, Eichstätt	Altmühltal Formation	Several complete specimens		

== Osteognathostomata ==
Color key: Taxon / Reclassified taxon / Taxon falsely reported as present / Dubious taxon or junior synonym / Ichnotaxon / Ootaxon / Morphotaxon

Notes
Uncertain or tentative taxa are in small text
~~crossed out~~ taxa are discredited.

=== Chondrostei ===
Genus	Species	Locality	Formation	Material	Notes	Images
Coccolepis	C. bucklandi	Eichstätt, Blumenberg	Altmühltal Formation	Several complete Specimens		
Coccolepis	C. solnhofensis	Solnhofen	Altmühltal Formation			

=== Pycnodontiformes ===
Genus	Species	Locality	Formation	Material	Notes	Images
Arduafrons	A. prominoris	Blumenberg, Wintershof, Painten	Altmühltal Formation, Torleite Formation	Several complete specimens		
Apomesodon	A. comosus	Eichstätt	Altmühltal Formation			
Apomesodon	A. sp	Eichstätt, Painten	Altmühltal Formation, Torleite Formation			
Eomesodon	E. gibbosus	Blumenberg, Wintershof, Painten	Altmühltal Formation, Torleite Formation	Several complete specimens		
Gyrodus	G. circularis	Eichstätt, Painten	Altmühltal Formation, Torleite Formation	Dozens of complete specimens		
Gyrodus	G. hexagonus	Solnhofen, Eichstätt, Painten, Schamhaupten, Brunn	Altmühltal Formation, Torleite Formation	Dozens of complete specimens		
Mesturus	M. verrucosus	Eichstätt, Painten	Altmühltal Formation, Torleite Formation	Several complete specimens		
Goodichthys	G. prettii	Wintershof, Eichstätt	Altmühltal Formation	Several complete specimens		
Macromesodon	M. heckeli					
Macromesodon	M. macropterus	Kelheim	Torleite Formation			
Piranhamesodon	P. pinnatomus	Ettling		Singular partial skeleton		
Proscinetes	P. elegans	Eichstätt. Ettling	Altmühltal Formation, Torleite Formation	Dozens of complete specimens		
Proscinetes	P. formosus					
Proscinetes	P. bernardi	Schamhaupten, Ettling, Painten	Torleite Formation	Several complete specimens		
Thiollierepycnodus	T. wagneri	Wattendorf	Torleite Formation			
Turbomesodon	T. relegans	Eichstätt, Ettling	Altmühltal Formation, Torleite Formation			
Turboscinetes	T. egertoni	Ettling				

=== Ginglymodi ===
==== Lepisosteiformes ====
Genus	Species	Locality	Formation	Material	Notes	Images
"Lepidotes"	"L." decoratus					
"Lepidotes"	"L." intermedius					
"Lepidotes"	"L." oblongus					
"Lepidotes"	"L." pustulosus					
"Lepidotes"	"L." subovatus					
"Lepidotes"	"L." unguiculatus					
Scheenstia	S. maximus					
Scheenstia	S. decoratus					
Scheenstia	S. zappi	Schamhaupten	Torleite Formation	Single almost complete specimen		

==== Semionotiformes ====
Genus	Species	Locality	Formation	Material	Notes	Images
Callipurbeckia	C. notopterus					
Macrosemimimus	M. fegerti	Ettling		Multiple complete specimens		

==== Macrosemiidae ====
Genus	Species	Locality	Formation	Material	Notes	Images
Histionotus	H. oberndorferi	Kelheim	Torleite Formation	Two incomplete specimens		
Macrosemius	M. rostratus	Eichstätt, Solnhofen, Painten	Altmühltal Formation, Torleite Formation	Dozens of complete specimens		
Macrosemius	M. fourneti	Brunn	Torleite Formation	One complete specimen		
Notagogus	N. decoratus					
Notagogus	N. denticulatus	Eichstätt, Schamhaupten, Painten, Brunn, Ettling?	Altmühltal Formation, Torleite Formation	Dozens of complete specimens		
Palaeomacrosemius	P. thiollieri	Eichstätt, Solnhofen, Ettling	Altmühltal Formation	Several complete specimens		
Propterus	P. elongatus	Eichstätt	Altmühltal Formation	Several complete specimens		
Propterus	P. microstomus	Eichstätt	Altmühltal Formation	Several complete specimens		
Eusemius?	E. beatae					
Voelklichthys	V. comitatus	Painten	Torleite Formation	Singular specimen		

=== Dapediiformes ===
Genus	Species	Locality	Formation	Material	Notes	Images
Heterostrophus	H. latus	Solnhofen	Altmühltal Formation			

=== Halecomorphi ===
==== Ionoscopidae ====
Genus	Species	Locality	Formation	Material	Notes	Images
Ainia	A. agassizi	Brunn	Torleite Formation			
Altmuehlfuro	A. boomerang					
Brachyichthys	B. radiato-puncatus					
Brachyichthys	B. typicus					
Ionoscopus	I. cyprinoides	Eichstätt	Altmühltal Formation			
Ionoscopus	I. desori	Zandt	Torleite Formation			
Ionoscopus	I. esocinus					
Ionoscopus	I. münsteri					
Ionoscopus	I. striatissimus					
"Furo"	"F." angustus	Solnhofen, Schamhaupten, Zandt	Altmühltal Formation, Torleite Formation			
"Furo"	"F." longiserratus	Eichstätt, Solnhofen, Kelheim, Zandt	Altmühltal Formation, Torleite Formation			
"Furo"	"F." latimanus	Solnhofen, Eichstätt	Altmühltal Formation			
Ophiopsis	O. muensteri	Kelheim, Brunn, Ettling				
Ophiopsiella	O. attenuata					
Ophiopsiella	O. breviceps					
Ophiopsiella	O. procera					
Schernfeldfuro	S. uweelleri	Eichstätt	Altmühltal Formation			
Zandtfuro	Z. tischlingeri	Zandt	Torleite Formation			

==== Amiiformes ====
Genus	Species	Locality	Formation	Material	Notes	Images
Amblysemius	A. bellicianus	Eichstätt	Altmühltal Formation			
Amblysemius	A. pachyurus					
Amblysemius	"A." granulatus	Kelheim	Altmühltal Formation			
Caturus	C. furcatus	Kelheim, Solnhofen, Ettling, Wattendorf?	Altmühltal Formation, Torleite Formation	Several complete specimens		
Caturus	C. brevicostatus	Kelheim, Eichstätt, Solnhofen	Altmühltal Formation	Several complete specimens		
Caturus	C. enkopicaudalis	Eichstätt, Solnhofen, Schernfeld, Langenaltheim, Painten	Altmühltal Formation, Painten Formation	Several complete specimens	Species of Caturus most prominently distinguished by the unique shape of its double emarginate caudal fin	
Caturus	"C." macrurus	Kelheim	Altmühltal Formation			
Caturus	"C." latus	Solnhofen	Altmühltal Formation			
Caturus	"C." granulatus	Kelheim	Altmühltal Formation			
Caturus	"C." ferox	Solnhofen	Altmühltal Formation			
"Furo"	"F." microlepidotus	Eichstätt	Altmühltal Formation			
Strobilodus	S. giganteus	Painten	Torleite Formation			
Liodesmus	L. gracilis	Solnhofen	Altmühltal Formation		Synonym of Caturus brevicostatus	
Nasrinotoudehichthys	N. sprattiformis	Zandt	Painten Formation			
Lophiurus?	L. minutus					
Amiopsis	A. lepidota	Eichstätt, Solnhofen, Ettling	Altmühltal Formation			
Solnhofenamia	S. elongata	Eichstätt	Altmühltal Formation			

=== Pleuropholidae ===
Genus	Species	Locality	Formation	Material	Notes	Images
Pleuropholis	P. laevissima	Daiting, Painten	Mörnsheim Formation, Torleite Formation			
Pleuropholis	P. pompecki					
Pleuropholis	P. wagneri					

=== Pachycormidae ===
Genus	Species	Locality	Formation	Material	Notes	Images
Asthenocormus	A. titanius	Eichstätt, Painten	Altmühltal Formation, Torleite Formation			
Hypsocormus	H. insignis	Obereichstätt, Solnhofen	Altmühltal Formation			
Hypsocormus	H. macrodon					
Leedsichthys?	L. sp					
Orthocormus	O. cornutus	Birkhof, Blumenberg, Schernfeld	Altmühltal Formation			
Orthocormus	O. roeperi	Brunn	Torleite Formation			
Orthocormus	O. teyleri?	Schamhaupten	Torleite Formation			
Pseudoasthenocormus	P. retrodorsalis	Langenaltheim	Altmühltal Formation			
Pachycormidae	Indeterminate	Wattendorf	Torleite Formation	Giant skull fragment of a presumably 4 meter long pachycormid		
Sauropsis	S. longimanus	Eichstätt, Blumenberg	Altmühltal Formation			
Sauropsis	S. depressus	Blumenberg, Schernfeld, Eichstätt	Altmühltal Formation			
Simocormus	S. macrolepidotus	Solnhofen, Eichstätt	Altmühltal Formation			

=== Aspidorhynchidae ===
Genus	Species	Locality	Formation	Material	Notes	Images
Aspidorhynchus	A. acutirostris	Eichstätt, Zandt, Painten	Altmühltal Formation, Torleite Formation			
Aspidorhynchus	A. ornatissimus					
Aspidorhynchus	A. sanzenbacheri	Ettling, Painten?	Torleite Formation			
Belonostomus	B. kochi	Kelheim, Ettling	Altmühltal Formation, Torleite Formation?			
Belonostomus	B. muensteri	Daiting, Mühlheim, Solnhofen, Langenaltheim, Zandt, Schamhaupten	Mörnsheim Formation, Altmühltal Formation, Torleite Formation			
Belonostomus	B. tenuirostris	Solnhofen, Zandt, Langenaltheim	Altmühltal Formation, Torleite Formation			
Belonostomus	B. speciosus	Solnhofen	Altmühltal Formation			
Belonostomus	B. spyraenoides	Eichstätt, Schernfeld, Wintershof	Altmühltal Formation			

=== "Pholidophoridae" ===
Genus	Species	Locality	Formation	Material	Notes	Images
Ankylophorus	Indeterminate.					
Eurycormus	E. speciosus	Eichstätt, Painten, Zandt	Altmühltal Formation, Torleite Formation			
Pholidophoristion	P. micronyx					
Pholidophoristion	P. ovatus	Ettling				
"Pholidophorus"						
"Pholidophorus"	"P." armatus					
"Pholidophorus"	"P." diagonalis					
"Pholidophorus"	"P." falcifer					
"Pholidophorus"	"P." microps					
"Pholidophorus"	"P." sculptus					
"Pholidophorus"	"P." latimanus					
"Pholidophorus"	"P." latus					
"Pholidophorus"	"P." longiserratus					
"Pholidophorus"	"P." smilis					
Siemensichthys	S. macrocephalus	Kapfelberg	Altmühltal Formation			
Siemensichthys	S. siemensi	Schamhaupten	Torleite Formation			

=== Crossognathiformes ===
Genus	Species	Locality	Formation	Material	Notes	Images
Bavarichthys	B. incognitus	Ettling	Torleite Formation?	Single complete skeleton	The oldest record of a crossognathiform in Europe	

=== Ichthyodectiformes ===
Genus	Species	Locality	Formation	Material	Notes	Images
Allothrissops	A. mesogaster					
Allothrissops	A. salmoneus	Eichstätt, Painten, brunn	Altmühltal Formation, Torleite Formation			
Ascalabothrissops	A. voelkli	Schamhaupten	Torleite Formation			
Pachythrissops	P. propterus	Kelheim, Zandt, Ettling	Altmühltal Formation, Torleite Formation			
Thrissops	T. formosus	Solnhofen, Eichstätt, Kelheim, Painten, Mühlheim, Ettling, Brunn	Altmühltal Formation, Painten Formation, Torleite Formation, Mörnsheim Formation			
Thrissops	T. subovatus	Solnhofen, Eichstätt, Kelheim, Painten, Ettling	Altmühltal Formation, Painten Formation, Torleite Formation			
Thrissops	T. ettlingensis	Ettling	Altmühltal Formation?			

=== Elopiformes ===
Genus	Species	Locality	Formation	Material	Notes	Images
Anaethalion	"A." angustissimus	Eichstätt, Painten	Altmühltal Formation, Torleite Formation			
Anaethalion	A. angustus	Langenaltheim, Eichstätt, Schernfeld	Altmühltal Formation			
Anaethalion	A. knorri					
Anaethalion	A. subovatus					
Anaethalion	A. zapporum	Schamhaupten	Torleite Formation			
Daitingichthys	D. tischlingeri	Daiting	Mörnsheim Formation			
Eichstaettia	E. mayri	Eichstätt	Altmühltal Formation			
Elopsomolos	E. frickhingeri	Blumenberg	Altmühltal Formation			
Elopsomolos	E. sp 1					
Elopsomolos	E. sp 2					
Elopsomolos	E. sp 3					

=== Osteoglossomorpha ===
Genus	Species	Locality	Formation	Material	Notes	Images
Ascalabos	A. voithii	Eichstätt, Schernfeld	Altmühltal Formation			
Tischlingerichthys	T. viohli					
Tharsis	T. dubius	Eichstätt, Painten	Altmühltal Formation, Torleite Formation			
Tharsis	T. elleri	Schernfeld	Altmühltal Formation			
Tharsis	T. sp	Wattendorf	Torleite Formation			
Ebertichthys	E. ettlingensis	Ettling	Torleite Formation?			
Leptolepides	L. haerteisi	Zandt, Schamhaupten	Torleite Formation			
Leptolepides	L. sprattiformis	Solnhofen, Eichstätt, Kelheim, Langenaltheim, Schernfeld, Blumenberg	Altmühltal Formation		Multiple Mass mortality plates of this species are known. It represents the most common vertebrate of the Solnhofen limestone.	
Orthogonikleithrus	O. hoelli	Ettling	Torleite Formation?			
Orthogonikleithrus	O. leichi	Ettling	Torleite Formation?			

=== Coelacanths ===
Genus	Species	Locality	Formation	Material	Notes	Images
Coccoderma	C. bavaricum	Kelheim	Altmühltal Formation			
Coccoderma	C. gigas	Kelheim	Altmühltal Formation			
Coccoderma	C. suevicum					
Coccoderma	C. nudum	Kelheim	Altmühltal Formation			
Libys	L. polypterus	Kelheim	Altmühltal Formation			
Libys	L. superbus	Zandt	Torleite Formation			
Undina	U. acutidens	Kelheim	Altmühltal Formation			
Undina	U. penicillata	Kelheim, Painten, Wattendorf	Altmühltal Formation, Torleite Formation			
Macropoma	M. willemoesi	Eichstätt	Altmühltal Formation			

== Reptiles ==
Color key: Taxon / Reclassified taxon / Taxon falsely reported as present / Dubious taxon or junior synonym / Ichnotaxon / Ootaxon / Morphotaxon

Notes
Uncertain or tentative taxa are in small text
~~crossed out~~ taxa are discredited.

=== Lizards ===
Name	Species	Locality	Formation	Material	Notes	Images
Ardeosaurus	A. brevipes	Eichstätt	Altmühltal Formation		Small Lepidosaur thought to be close to the base of Geckota	
Bavarisaurus	B. macrodactylus	Kelheim	Altmühltal Formation			
Eichstaettisaurus	E. schroederi	Eichstätt	Altmühltal Formation			
Limnoscansor	L. digitatellus	Solnhofen, Eichstätt	Altmühltal Formation			
Palaeolacerta	P. bavarica					
Schoenesmahl	S. dyspepsia	Kelheim	Altmühltal Formation		Bavariasaurid lizard that was found in the stomach of the Compsognathus Holotype	

=== Rhynchocephalians ===
Genus	Species	Locality	Formation	Material	Notes	Images
Homoeosaurus	H. maximillioni	Eichstätt, Painten, Schamhaupten, Kelheim	Altmühltal Formation, Torleite Formation			
Kallimodon	K. pulchellus	Eichstätt	Altmühltal Formation		Sapheosauridae	
Oenosaurus	O. muehlheimensis	Mühlheim	Mörnsheim Formation		Rhynchocephalian with dentition unique among tetrapods	
Piocormus	P. laticeps	Painten?	Torleite Formation			
Pleurosaurus	P. goldfussi	Eichstätt, Langenaltheim, Painten, Mühlheim, Wattendorf	Altmühltal Formation, Torleite Formation, Mörnsheim Formation		Acrosaurus frischmanni is a possible junior synonym	
Sapheosaurus	S. laticeps	Eichstätt, Painten	Altmühltal Formation, Torleite Formation		Large sapheosaurid reaching 70 cm in length, it may be semi-aquatic	
Sphenodraco	S. scandentis	Eichstätt	Altmühltal Formation	Nearly complete skeleton preserved on a slab and counterslab, housed in two separate institutions	Possibly the first known arboreal rhynchocephalian	
Sphenofontis	S. velserae	Brunn	Torleite Formation			
Vadasaurus	V. herzogi	Painten	Torleite Formation		Rhynchocephalian close to the base of Pleurosauridae	

=== Ichthyosaurs ===
Genus	Species	Locality	Formation	Material	Notes	Images
Aegirosaurus	A. leptospondylus	Eichstätt, Solnhofen	Altmühltal Formation			
Jabalisaurus	J. tethyensis	Eichstätt	Altmühltal Formation	A complete skeleton encased in soft tissue		
Ichthyosauria	Indeterminate	Painten	Torleite Formation			
Ichthyosauria	Indeterminate	Painten	Torleite Formation			
"Ichthyosaurus"	"I." posthumus	Eichstätt, Kelheim, Solnhofen	Altmühltal Formation		Nomen dubium. Known only from isolated teeth.	
Nannopterygius?	N. sp	Daiting	Mörnsheim Formation			

=== Turtles ===
Genus	Species	Locality	Formation	Material	Notes	Images
Achelonia	A. formosa	Wattendorf	Torleite Formation			
Cyrtura	C. temnospondyla	Solnhofen	Altmühltal Formation			
Eurysternum	E. wagleri	Solnhofen, Kelheim, Painten, Wattendorf	Altmühltal Formation, Torleite Formation			
Idiochelys	I. fitzingeri	Eichstätt	Altmühltal Formation			
Palaeomedusa	P. testa	Kelheim, Eichstätt, Solnhofen	Altmühltal Formation		Eurysternum crassipes and Thalassemys marina are synonyms.	
Platychelys	P. oberndorferi	Kelheim	Altmühltal Formation		Platychelyid sea turtle	
Solnhofia	S. parsonsi	Eichstätt, Painten	Altmühltal Formation, Torleite Formation			
Tropidemys	T. langii	Wattendorf	Torleite Formation			
Thalassemys	T. bruntrutana	Wattendorf	Torleite Formation			

=== Crocodylomorphs ===
Genus	Species	Locality	Formation	Material	Notes	Images
Aeolodon	A. priscus	Daiting	Mörnsheim Formation	Two partial skeletons	A teleosaur	
Alligatorellus	A. bavaricus	Eichstätt, Kelheim, Painten	Altmühltal Formation, Mörnsheim Formation	Partial skeleton	An atoposaurid	
Atoposaurus	A. oberndorferi	Eichstätt	Altmühltal Formation		An atoposaurid	
Cricosaurus	C. albersdoerferi	Painten	Torleite Formation	Complete skeleton preserving soft tissue		
Cricosaurus	C. bambergensis	Wattendorf	Torleite Formation	One almost complete skeleton		
Cricosaurus	C. elegans	Eichstätt, Solnhofen, Daiting	Altmühltal Formation, Mörnsheim Formation	Skull and vertebrae (NHM 43005) Partial skull (NHM 37006)	A metriorhynchid	
Cricosaurus	C. rauhuti	Mühlheim	Mörnsheim Formation	Partial 3D skull		
Crocodilaemus	C. sp	Brunn	Torleite Formation	Complete skeleton of a juvenile		
Dakosaurus	D. maximus	Eichstätt, Schernfeld, Schamhaupten, Painten, Kelheim	Altmühltal Formation, Torleite Formation	Isolated teeth (JME-SOS4577, JME-SOS2535)	A metriorhynchid	
Geosaurus	G. giganteus	Solnhofen, Daiting	Altmühltal Formation, Mörnsheim Formation	Skull and mandible (NHM 37020) Isolated tooth (NHM 37016)	A metriorhynchid	
Geosaurus	G. grandis	Daiting	Mörnsheim Formation			
Rhacheosaurus	R. gracilis	Eichstätt, Zandt, Daiting	Altmühltal Formation, Mörnsheim Formation, Torleite Formation	Skull and skeleton (NHM R.3948)	A metriorhynchid	
Machimosaurus	M. sp	Mühlheim	Mörnsheim Formation	Isolated teeth	A machimosaurid teleosaur	
Sericodon	S. jugleri			Isolated Teeth	An aeolodontine teleosaur	

=== Dinosaurs ===
Genus	Species	Locality	Formation	Material	Notes	Image
Archaeopteryx	A. albersdoerferi	Daiting	Mörnsheim Formation	Parts of the skull and wings		
Archaeopteryx	A. siemensii	Langenaltheim, Workerszell	Altmühltal Formation			
Archaeopteryx	A. lithographica	Langenaltheim, Eichstätt	Altmühltal Formation			
Alcmonavis	A. poeschli	Mühlheim	Mörnsheim Formation	Partial wing		
Compsognathus	C. longipes	Kelheim (Goldberg)	Altmühltal Formation	Complete skeleton	Stomach contents are preserved in the form of the lizard Schoenesmahl. A second specimen of the genus is known from the French Canjuers Lagerstätte.	
Juravenator	J. starki	Schamhaupten	Torleite Formation	Single complete skeleton with soft tissue		
Ostromia	O. crassipes	Jachenhausen	Torleite Formation	Partial limb bones		
Sciurumimus	S. albersdoerferi	Painten	Torleite Formation	Complete skeleton of a juvenile preserving soft tissue		
Wellnhoferia	W. grandis	Altmühltal	Altmühltal Formation	Almost complete skeleton	Possibly synonymous with Archaeopteryx.	

=== Pterosaurs ===
Genus	Species	Locality	Formation	Material	Notes	Images
Aerodactylus	A. scolopaciceps				Formerly classified as a species of Pterodactylus, closely related to Ardeadactylus, Aurorazhdarcho, and Cycnorhamphus.	
Anurognathus	A. ammoni			The holotype consists of a partial skeleton, while the second specimen is represented by a perfectly preserved juvenile including soft tissue.		
Ardeadactylus	A. longicollum			The holotype was destroyed in a WW2 air raid, but another more complete specimen is known from the Nusplingen limestone.	Formerly considered a species of Pterodactylus, it is more closely related to Gnathosaurus and Germanodactylus.	
Altmuehlopterus	A. rhamphastinus					
Aurorazhdarcho	A. micronyx					
Bellubrunnus	B. rothgaengeri	Brunn	Torleite Formation	Single complete skeleton of a juvenile		
Balaenognathus	B. maeuseri	Wattendorf	Torleite Formation			
Ctenochasma	C. elegans				Originally classified as Pterodactylus elegans	
Ctenochasma	C. gracile					
Ctenochasma	C. sp	Mühlheim	Mörnsheim Formation	Skull and two cervical vertebrae		
Cycnorhamphus	C. suevicus				Originally classified as Pterodactylus suevicus. This genus originally hails from the Nusplingen Limestone	
Diopecephalus	D. kochi					
Germanodactylus	G. cristatus				Originally classified as Pterodactylus cristatus	
Gnathosaurus	G. subulatus					
Laueropterus	L . vitriolus	Mülheim	Mörnsheim Formation	Partial skeleton and skull	A non-pterodactyloid monofenestratan	
Makrodactylus	M. oligodontus	Mühlheim	Mörnsheim Formation	Partial skeleton and skull	A non-pterodactyloid monofenestratan	
Spathagnathus	S. roeperi	Brunn	Torleite Formation	Isolated incomplete rostrum	Gnathosaurine ctenochasmatid with novel tooth and dental enamel features	
Pterodactylus	P. antiquus				Only one species is currently supported as valid, the rest represent growth stages, often of other species, synonyms, or nomina dubia.	Photographs of two fossil specimens with a mouse outline for scale
Petrodactyle	P. wellnhoferi	Mühlheim	Mörnsheim Formation			
Propterodactylus	P. frankerlae	Ulmense	Painten Formation	A complete skeleton	Notable for its transitional features between pterodactyloids and more basal monofenestratans	
Rhamphorhynchus	R. muensteri	Eichstätt, Solnhofen, Painten, Kelheim	Altmühltal Formation, Torleite Formation		Only one species is currently supported as valid, the rest represent growth stages, often of other species, synonyms, or nomina dubia.	
"Rhamphodactylus"	Indeterminate	Mühlheim	Mörnsheim Formation			
Scaphognathus	S. crassirostris	Eichstätt, Mühlheim	Altmühltal Formation, Mörnsheim Formation		A Solnhofen genus erected in 1861 by J. A. Wagner when he recognized the rhamphorhynchoid nature of "Pterodactylus" crassirostris after the discovery of a specimen with a preserved tail. The Solnhofen Limestone is the only known source of Scaphognathus fossils. S. crassirostris was originally named P. crassirostris in 1831 by August Goldfuss who mistook the tailless specimen for a new Pterodactylus species.	
Skiphosoura	S. bavarica	Mühlheim	Mörnsheim Formation	Mostly complete disarticulated skeleton	A large basal monofenstratan	

=== Sauropterygia ===
Genus	Species	Locality	Formation	Material	Notes	Images
Pliosauridae	Indeterminate	Kelheim, Painten	Altmühltal Formation, Torleite Formation	Isolated teeth of great size		

== Echinodermata ==
=== Crinoids ===
Genus	Species	Locality	Formation	Notes	Images
Liliocrinus	L. sp				
Millericrinus	M. mespiliformis				
Millericrinus	M. nobilis				
Balanocrinus	B. sigmaringensis				
Balanocrinus	B. subteres				
Pentacrinus	P. cf. pentagonalis				
Comaturella	C. pennata	Solnhofen, Zandt, Langenaltheimer Haardt	Almtühltal Formation, Painten Formation		
Comaturella	C. formosa	Zandt	Painten Formation		
Solanocrinites	S. costatus				
Solanocrinites	S. gracilis				
Solanocrinites	S. imperialis				
Saccocoma	S. pectinata			Saccocoma remains are the most common macroscopic fossils in the Solnhofen limestone.	
Saccocoma	S. tenella	Eichstätt, Solnhofen, Blumenberg	Altmühltal Formation	Saccocoma remains are the most common macroscopic fossils in the Solnhofen limestone.	

=== Ophiuroidea ===
Genus	Species	Locality	Formation	Notes	Images
Geocoma	G. carinata	Solnhofen, Zandt	Altmühltal Formation, Painten Formation		
Geocoma	G. planata				
Ophiopetra	O. lithographica	Kelheim, Hienheim	Painten Formation		
Ophiurella	O. speciosa	Solnhofen, Painten	Altmühltal Formation, Painten Formation		
Sinosura	S. kelheimense	Hienheim, Ried, Kelheim	Painten Formation		

=== Asteroidea ===
Genus	Species	Locality	Formation	Notes	Images
Archasteropecten	A. elegans				
Lithaster	L. jurassicus				
Pentasteria	P. tithonica	Hienheim	Painten Formation		
Pentasteria	P. lithographica	Zandt	Painten Formation		
Riedaster	R. reicheli	Ried	Painten Formation		
Terminaster	T. cancriformis	Böhmfeld	Altmühltal Formation		

=== Echinoidea ===
==== Cidaroidea ====
Genus	Species	Locality	Formation	Notes	Images
Diplocidaris	D. sp	Eichstätt	Altmühltal Formation		
Rhabdocidaris	R. boehmi				
Rhabdocidaris	R. mayri				
Rhabdocidaris	R. orbignyana	Brunn, Painten	Torleite Formation, Painten Formation		
Rhabdocidaris	R. trispinata				
Rhabdocidaris	R. sp	Painten	Painten Formation		
Plegiocidaris	P. blumenbachii				
Plegiocidaris	P. sp				
Paracidaris	P. sp				

==== Euechinoidea ====
Genus	Species	Locality	Formation	Notes	Images
Diadematacea	Indeterminate				
Echinothurioidea	Indeterminate				
Polydiadema	P. sp				
Diademopsis	D. sp				
Hemipedina	H. sp				
Pedina	P. lithographica				
Pedina	P. sp	Painten	Painten Formation		
Phymopedina	P. marchamensis	Painten	Painten Formation		
Phymopedina	P. sp				
Hemicidaris	H. intermedia	Eichstätt, Zandt, Painten	Altmühltal Formation, Painten Formation		
Acrocidaris	A. sp				
Diplopodia	D. subangularis				
Pseudodiadema	P. lithographica	Ried, Breitenhill	Painten Formation		
Pseudodiadema	P. pseudodiadema				
Tetragramma	T. planissima	Painten	Painten Formation		

==== Other Echinoids ====
Genus	Species	Locality	Formation	Notes	Images
Phymosoma	P. sp	Mörnsheim, Breitenhill	Mörnsheim Formation, Painten Formation		
Pseudosalenia	P. aspera	Brunn, Schamhaupten	Painten Formation, Torleite Formation		
Pygaster	P. sp				
Holectypus	H. corallinus				
Holectypus	H. sp				
Kieripygurus	K. jurensis				
Pygurus	P. sp	Eichstätt, Kelheim, Schamhaupten, Painten	Altmühltal Formation, Painten Formation		
Nucleolites	N. sp	Brunn, Kelheim	Painten Formation, Torleite Formation		
Collyropsis	C. carinata				
Collyropsis	C. sp				
Stomechinus	S. perlatus	Kapfelberg	Altmühltal Formation?		

=== Holothuroidea ===
Genus	Species	Locality	Formation	Notes	Images
Jumaraina	J. sp				
Achistrum	A. sp				
Hemisphaerantos	H. sp				
Priscopedatus	P. sp				
Synallactidae	Indeterminate				

== Molluscs ==
=== Bivalvia ===
==== Protobranchia ====
Genus	Species	Locality	Formation	Notes	Images
Nuculida?	Indeterminate				
Solemya	S. sp	Pfalzpaint	Altmühltal Formation	a solemyidan	

==== Autobranchia ====
Genus	Species	Locality	Formation	Notes	Images
Modiolus	M. sp			a mytilidan	
Arcomytilus	A. furcatus	Eichstätt	Altmühltal Formation	a mytilidan	
Lithophaga?	L. sp			a mytilidan	
Grammatodon	G. sp			an arcidan	
Pseudomytiloides	P. sp			a pteriidan	
Bakevellia?	B. sp			a pteriidan	
Gervillia?	G. sp	Pfalzpaint	Altmühltal Formation	a pteriidan	
Inoceramus	I. sp	Eichstätt, Langenaltheim	Altmühltal Formation	a pteriidan	
Pinna	P. sp			a pteriidan	
Liostrea	L. socialis	Eichstätt, Painten	Altmühltal Formation, Painten Formation	an ostreidan	
Liostrea	L. roemeri	Daiting, Painten	Mörnsheim Formation, Painten Formation	an ostreidan	
Actinostreon	A. solitarium			an ostreidan	
Atreta	A .sp	Langenaltheim	Altmühltal Formation	a pectinidan	
Aulacomyella	A. sp			a pectinidan	
Buchia	B. tenuistriata	Wegscheid	Altmühltal Formation	a pectinidan	
Camptonectes?	C. sp			a pectinidan	
Chlamys	C. textoria			a pectinidan	
Cingentolium	C. sp			a pectinidan	
Entolium	E. sp	Zandt	Painten Formation	a pectinidan	
Eopectens	E. velatus	Blumenberg, Wegscheid, Kelheim	Altmühltal Formation, Painten Formation	a pectinidan	
Eopectens	E. subtilis	Langenaltheim	Altmühltal Formation	a pectinidan	
Plicatula	P. sp			a pectinidan	
Propeamussium	P. nonarium			a pectinidan	
Radulopectens	R. strictus			a pectinidan	
Spondylopecten	S. sp			a pectinidan	
Plagiostoma	P. phillipsi	Schernfeld	Altmühltal Formation	a limid	
Pseudolimea	P. sp			a limid	

=== Cephalopods ===
==== Nautiloidea ====
Genus	Species	Locality	Formation	Notes	Images
Pseudaganides	P. franconicus	Solnhofen?	Altmühltal Formation	a nautilid	
Pseudaganides	P. sp	Mühlheim	Mörnsheim Formation	a nautilid	
Pseudonautilus	P. sp	Mühlheim	Mörnsheim Formation	a nautilid	

==== Ammonoidea ====
Genus	Species	Locality	Formation	Notes	Images
Phylloceras	P. serum	Daiting	Mörnsheim Formation	a phylloceratid	
Glochiceras	G. cf. lens			a opellidid	
Streblites	S. sp	Eichstätt, Blumenberg	Altmühltal Formation	a streblitinaen	
Fontannesiella	F. prolithographica	Solnhofen, Daiting, Mörnsheim	Altmühltal Formation, Mörnsheim Formation	a taremelliceratinaen	
Fontannesiella	F. cf. franciscanum	Eichstätt	Altmühltal Formation	a taremelliceratinaen	
Fontannesiella	F. cf. euglyptum	Langenaltheimer Haardt	Altmühltal Formation	a taremelliceratinaen	
Lingulaticeras	L. planulatum			a taremelliceratinaen	
Lingulaticeras	L. solenoides	Wegscheid	Altmühltal Formation	a taremelliceratinaen	
Lingulaticeras	L. sp			a taremelliceratinaen	
Metahaploceras	M. acallopistum			a taremelliceratinaen	
Metahaploceras	M. rebouletianum			a taremelliceratinaen	
Metahaploceras	M. subnudatum			a taremelliceratinaen	
Neochetoceras	N. bous	Blumenberg, Birkhof	Altmühltal Formation	a taremelliceratinaen	
Neochetoceras	N. mucronatum			a taremelliceratinaen	
Neochetoceras	N. praecursor			a taremelliceratinaen	
Neochetoceras	N. steraspis	Solnhofen, Eichstätt, Hummelberg	Atlmühltal Formation, Mörnsheim Formation	a taremelliceratinaen	
Paralingulaticeras	P. haeberleini			a taremelliceratinaen	
Paralingulaticeras	P. lithographicum	Solnhofen	Altmühltal Formation	a taremelliceratinaen	
Paralingulaticeras	P. nodosum			a taremelliceratinaen	
Paralingulaticeras	P. percevali			a taremelliceratinaen	
Taramelliceras	T. hemipleurum			a taremelliceratinaen	
Aspidoceras	A. hoplisum	Solnhofen, Wegscheid	Atlmühltal Formation	an aspidoceratid	
Aspidoceras	A .sp	Brunn	Torleite Formation	an aspidoceratid	
Physodoceras	P. episoides			an aspidoceratid	
Physodoceras	P. hermanni	Brunn	Torleite Formation	an aspidoceratid	
Physodoceras	P. nattheimense			an aspidoceratid	
Physodoceras	P. pipini			an aspidoceratid	
Sutneria	S. apora	Birkhof, Wintershof	Altmühltal Formation	an aspidoceratid	
Sutneria	S. bracheri			an aspidoceratid	
Sutneria	S. rebholzi			an aspidoceratid	
Sutneria	S. subeumela	Brunn	Torleite Formation	an aspidoceratid	
Sutneria	S. sp			an aspidoceratid	
Hybonotella	H. mundula	Langenaltheimer Haardt	Altmühltal Formation	an aspidoceratid	
Hybonoticeras	H. hybonotum	Solnhofen, Blumenberg	Altmühltal Formation	an aspidoceratid	
Hybonoticeras	H. pseudohybonotum			an aspidoceratid	
Hybonoticeras	H. sp			an aspidoceratid	
Gravesia	G. gigas	Hienheim, Ried, Wegscheid	Painten Formation	a perisphinctid	
Gravesia	G. sp			a perisphinctid	
Berckhemeria	B. cf. scherzingeri			a perisphinctid	
Virgataxioceras	V. setatum			an ataxioceratid	
Virgataxioceras	V. supinum			an ataxioceratid	
Virgataxioceras	V. sp			an ataxioceratid	
Euvirgalithacoceras	E. supremum	Solnhofen, Eichstätt	Atlmühltal Formation	an ataxioceratid	
Euvirgalithacoceras	E. eystettense	Eichstätt	Altmühltal Formation	an ataxioceratid	
Hoelderia	H. sp	Wintershof	Altmühltal Formation	an ataxioceratid	
Lithacoceras	L. eigeltingense	Zandt	Painten Formation	an ataxioceratid	
Lithacoceras	L. eystettense			an ataxioceratid	
Lithacoceras	L. cf. liptingense	Langenaltheimer Haardt	Altmühltal Formation	an ataxioceratid	
Lithacoceras	L. cf. riedense			an ataxioceratid	
Lithacoceras	L. cf. ulmense			an ataxioceratid	
Lithacoceras	L. sp	Schernfeld, Eichstätt	Altmühltal Formation	an ataxioceratid	
Pseudodiscosphinctes	P. ardescicus			an ataxioceratid	
Silisphinctes	S. cf. russi	Zandt	Painten Formation	an ataxioceratid	
Silisphinctes	S. sp	Wegscheid	Altmühltal Formation	an ataxioceratid	
Subplanites	S. moernsheimensis	Daiting	Mörnsheim Formation	an ataxioceratid	
Subplanites	S. postrueppellianus	Solnhofen, Blumenberg, Wintershof, Eichstätt	Altmühltal Formation	an ataxioceratid	
Subplanites	S. rueppellianus	Solnhofen, Wegscheid	Altmühltal Formation	an ataxioceratid	
Subplanites	S. viohli	Eichstätt	Altmühltal Formation	an ataxioceratid	
Subplanites	S. laisackerensis	Birkhof	Altmühltal Formation	an ataxioceratid	
"Torquatisphinctes"	"S". filiplex			an ataxioceratid	
"Torquatisphinctes"	"S". isolatus			an ataxioceratid	
Aulacostephanus	A. cf. subundorae	Painten	Torleite Formation?, Painten Formation	an aulacostephanid	

==== Belemnoidea ====
Genus	Species	Locality	Formation	Notes	Images
Acanthoteuthis	A. leichi			A belemnoteuthid	
Acanthoteuthis	A. speciosa	Solnhofen, Eichstätt, Birkhof	Altmühltal Formation	A belemnoteuthid	
Belemnoteuthis	B. mayri	Wintershof	Altmühltal Formation	A belemnoteuthid	
Hibolithes	H. hasatus	Solnhofen, Breitenhill, Painten	Altmühltal Formation, Painten Formation, Torleite Formation	A mesohibolitidaen	
Hibolithes	H. semisulcatus			A mesohibolitidaen	
Pavloviteuthis	P. kapitzkei	Wegscheid	Altmühltal Formation	A belemnoid	
Rhaphibelus	R. acicula	Eichstätt. Blumenberg, Wegscheid	Altmühltal Formation	A belemnitidan	
Winkleriteuthis	W. problematicus	Schernfeld	Altmühltal Formation	A belemnoid	

==== Vampyromorpha ====
Genus	Species	Locality	Formation	Notes	Images
Boreopeltis	B. sagittata	Solnhofen	Altmühltal Formation	A plesioteuthid	
Engeseriteuthis	E. arcuatus	Schamhaupten	Painten Formation	A muensterelloid	
Plesioteuthis	P. prisca	Eichstätt, Solnhofen, Wegscheid, Schamhaupten	Altmühltal Formation, Painten Formation	A plesioteuthid	
Plesioteuthis	P. subovata	Eichstätt	Altmühltal Formation	A plesioteuthid	
Senefelderiteuthis	S. tricarinata	Eichstätt, Daiting	Altmühltal Formation, Mörnsheim Formation	A plesioteuthid	
Trachyteuthis	T. hastiformis	Daiting, Painten, Eichstätt, Brunn	Mörnsheim Formation, Altmühltal Formation, Painten Formation, Torleite Formation	A trachyteuthid	
Trachyteuthis	T. teudopsiformis	Blumenberg, Schamhaupten	Altmühltal Formation, Painten Formation	A trachyteuthid	
Teudopsinia	T. grossheidei	Eichstätt	Altmühltal Formation	A teudopseid	
Tyrionella	T. fauseri	Schernfeld	Altmühltal Formation	A patelloctopodid	
Donovaniteuthis	D. schoepfeli			A leptoteuthid possibly synonymous with Leptoteuthis	
Leptoteuthis	L. gigas	Solnhofen, Eichstätt, Blumenberg	Altmühltal Formation	A leptoteuthid and the largest cephalopod known from the Solnhofen Limestone	
Listroteuthis	L. conica	Daiting	Mörnsheim Formation	A muensterellid. Holotype specimen destroyed during WW2	
Bavaripeltis	B. bavarica	Solnhofen	Altmühltal Formation	A mastigophorid=	
Doryanthes	D. munsterii	Eichstätt, Blumenberg, Mörnsheim	Mörnsheim Formation, Altmühltal Formation	A mastigophorid	
Palaeololigo	P. albersdoerferi	Eichstätt	Altmühltal Formation	A palaeololiginid	
Palaeololigo	P. oblonga	Schernfeld	Altmühltal Formation	A palaeololiginid	
Celaenoteuthis	C. incerta	Solnhofen, Eichstätt, Birkscheid	Altmühltal Formation	A muensterelloid	
Muensterella	M. scutellaris	Eichstätt, Solnhofen, Wegscheid, Wintershof, Painten, Mörnsheim	Mörnsheim Formation, Altmühltal Formation, Painten Formation	A muensterellid	
Muensterella	M. spinosa	Daiting	Mörnsheim Formation	A muensterellid	

== Crustacea ==
=== Cirripedia ===
Genus	Species	Locality	Formation	Notes	Images
Archaeolepas	A. redtenbacheri	Ried, Hienheim, Kehlheim	Painten Formation	Specimens of this Genus are often found in small groups attache to the ammonite Gravesius	
Eolepas	E. quenstedti	Blumenberg	Altmühltal Formation	This genus often occurs attached to the flanks of perisphinctid ammonites but it is also found attached to sponges of the genus Codites	
Martillepas("Pollicipes")	M. holisi	Brunn	Torleite Formation	Commonly found attached to ammonites	
Litholepas	L. klausreschi	Blumenberg	Altmühltal Formation	The species is based on 13 complete specimens attached to a sponge of the genus Codites	

=== Malocastrata ===
Genus	Species	Locality	Formation	Notes	Images
Sculda	S. pennata	Solnhofen, Eichstätt, Zandt, Öchselberg	Altmühltal Formation, Painten Formation	A stomatopod	
Sculda	S. pusilla			A dubious species of stomatopod	
Sculda	S. spinosa	Eichstätt	Altmühltal Formation	A stomatopod	
Spinosculda	S. ehrlichi	Eichstätt, ´Zandt, Wegscheid	Altmühltal Formation, Painten Formation	A stomatopod	
Gigantosculda	G. ehrlichfeckei	Blumenberg, Schernfeld	Altmühltal Formation	A stomatopod	
Tyrannosculda	T. laurea	Schernfeld	Altmühltal Formation	A stomatopod	
Anthonema	A. problematicum	Eichstätt, Schernfeld	Altmühltal Formation	This species of krill is known from mass mortality plates	
Elder	E. ungulatus	Solnhofen, Eichstätt, Schernfeld, Zandt	Altmühltal Formation, Painten Formation	A glass shrimp	
Francocaris	F. grimmi	Eichstätt, Schernfeld, Zandt, Mühlheim	Mörnsheim Formation,Altmühltal Formation, Painten Formation	A glass shrimp	
Naranda	N. anomala	Eichstätt, Zandt	Altmühltal Formation, Painten Formation	A glass shrimp	

=== Isopoda ===
Genus	Species	Locality	Formation	Notes	Images
Bopyridae	Indeterminate			Presence indicated by characteristic markings on the exoskeletons of other crustaceans	
Brunnaega	B. roeperi	Brunn	Torleite Formation	A cymothoidid	
Brunnella	B. rothgaengeri	Brunn	Torleite Formation	A cymothoidid	
Palaega	P. kunthi	Solnhofen, Schernfeld, Wegscheid, Zandt	Altmühltal Formation, Painten Formation	A cymothoidid	
Palaega	P. sp			A cymothoidid	
Schweglerella	S. strobli	Solnhofen	Altmühltal Formation	A sphaeromatid	
Urda	U. rostrata	Solnhofen, Eichstätt	Altmühltal Formation	indeterminate isopod	
Urda	U. punctata	Eichstätt	Altmühltal Formation	indeterminate isopod	
Niveotanais	N. brunnensis	Brunn	Torleite Formation	A tanadacean	

=== Decapoda ===
==== Penaeoidea ====
Genus	Species	Locality	Formation	Notes	Images
Acanthochirana	A. angulata	Eichstätt, Wegscheid, Zandt	Altmühltal Formation, Painten Formation	An aegerid	
Acanthochirana	A. cordata	Eichstätt, Wegscheid, Zandt	Altmühltal Formation, Painten Formation	An aegerid	
Acanthochirana	A. longipes	Eichstätt	Altmühltal Formation	An aegerid	
Aeger	A. elegans	Solnhofen, Eichstätt, Wegscheid, Zandt	Altmühltal Formation, Painten Formation	An aegerid	
Aeger	A. spinipes	Eichstätt, Wegscheid, Langenaltheim, Schernfeld	Altmühltal Formation	An aegerid	
Aeger	A. tipularius	Solnhofen, Eichstätt, Schernfeld	Altmühltal Formation	An aegerid	
Epipenaeus(Carpopenaeus)	E. peterbuergeri	Breitenhill	Painten Formation	A carpopenaid	
Albertoppelia	A. kuempeli	Eichstätt, Schamhaupten, Breitenhill	Altmühltal Formation, Painten Formation	A penaeidid	
Antrimpos	A. nonodon	Solnhofen, Eichstätt, Breitenhill	Altmühltal Formation, Painten Formation	A penaeidid	
Antrimpos	A. speciosus	Solnhofen, Eichstätt, Zandt	Altmühltal Formation, Painten Formation	A penaeidid	
Antrimpos	A. undenarius	Solnhofen, Zandt	Altmühltal Formation, Painten Formation	A penaeidid	
Bylgia	"B." haeberleini			A penaeidid	
Bylgia	"B." hexadon			A penaeidid	
Bylgia	B. ruedeli	Painten, Breitenhill	Painten Formation	A penaeidid	
Bylgia	B. spinosa	Eichstätt, Schernfeld, Breitenhill	Altmühltal Formation, Painten Formation	A penaeidid	
Bylgia	B. anjobea	Breitenhill	Painten Formation	A penaeidid	
Drobna	D. deformis	Eichstätt, Schernfeld, Zandt	Altmühltal Formation, Painten Formation	A penaeidid	
Dusa	D. denticulata	Eichstätt	Altmühltal Formation	A penaeidid	
Dusa	D. monocera	Eichstätt, Wegscheid, Painten, Zandt	Altmühltal Formation, Painten Formation	A penaeidid	
Dusa	D. reschi	Eichstätt, Schernfeld	Altmühltal Formation	A penaeidid	
Eystaettia	E. intermedius	Eichstätt, Schernfeld, Wegscheid, Zandt	Altmühltal Formation, Painten Formation	A penaeidid	
Franconipenaeus	F. meyeri	Solnhofen, Eichstätt, Wegscheid	Altmühltal Formation	A penaeidid	
Koelga	K. curvirostris	Eichstätt, Zandt	Altmühltal Formation, Painten Formation	A penaeidid	
Koelga	K. muensteri	Eichstätt	Altmühltal Formation	A penaeidid	
Libanocaris	L. annettae	Eichstätt, Schernfeld, Breitenhill	Altmühltal Formation, Painten Formation	A penaeidid	
Pseudodusa	P. frattigianii	Eichstätt	Altmühltal Formation	A penaeidid	

==== Caridae ====
Genus	Species	Locality	Formation	Notes	Images
Schmelingia	S. wulfi	Eichstätt	Altmühltal Formation	A palaemonid	
Udora	U. brevispina	Solnhofen, Eichstätt, Wegscheid, Zandt	Alltmühltal Formation, Painten Formation	A procaridoid	
Udora	U. koschnyi	Eichstätt	Altmühltal Formation	A procaridoid	
Udorella	U. agassizi	Kelheim	Painten Formation	A procaridoid	
Harthofia	H. bergeri	Eichstätt, Schernfeld, Wegscheid	Altmühltal Formation	A alvinocarid	
Harthofia	H. blumenbergi	Eichstätt, Schernfeld, Wegscheid	Altmühltal Formation	A alvinocarid	
Harthofia	H. polzi	Eichstätt, Zandt	Altmühltal Formation, Painten Formation	A alvinocarid	
Harthofia	H. heidenreichetfauseri	Eichstätt, Wegscheid	Altmühltal Formation	A alvinocarid	
Alcmonacaris	A. winkleri	Eichstätt, Schernfeld	Altmühltal Formation	A carid	
Bavaricaris	haereri	Wegscheid, Blumenberg	Altmühltal Formation	Potentially a palaemonid	
Blaculla	B. nikoides	Solnhofen, Eichstätt, Schernfeld, Wegscheid	Altmühltal Formation	A carid	
Blaculla	B. sieboldi	Eichstätt, Mühlheim	Mörnsheim Formation, Altmühltal Formation	A carid	
Blaculla	B. haugi	Eichstätt, Schernfeld, Wegscheid	Altmühltal Formation	A carid	
Blaculla	B. felthausetsauteri	Eichstätt, Schernfeld	Altmühltal Formation	A carid	
Blaculla	B. anjobea	Eichstätt, Wegscheid	Altmühltal Formation	A carid	
Buergerocaris	B. psittacoides	Solnhofen, Eichstätt, Schernfeld, Zandt	Altmühltal Formation, Painten Formation	A carid	
Ctenodusa	C. bronni	Eichstätt, Painten	Altmühltal Formation, Painten Formation	A carid	
Hefriga	H. frischmanni	Eichstätt, Wegscheid, Zandt	Altmühltal Formation, Painten Formation	A carid	
Hefriga	H. proboscideawulfi	Zandt	Painten Formation	A carid	
Hefriga	H. norbertwinkleri	Eichstätt, Schernfeld	Altmühltal Formation	A carid	
Hefriga	H. rogerfrattigianii	Eichstätt	Altmühltal Formation	A carid	
Hefriga	H. serrata	Eichstätt, Wegscheid, Breitenhill	Altmühltal Formation, Painten Formation	A carid	
Hefriga	H. schlechtingerae	Eichstätt, Wegscheid	Altmühltal Formation	A carid	
Pleopteryx	P, kuempeli	Solnhofen, Eichstätt, Schernfeld, Zandt	Altmühltal Formation, Painten Formation	A carid	
Schernfeldia	S. schweigerti	Schernfeld	Altmühltal Formation	A carid	
Occultocaris	O. feckei	Schernfeld	Altmühltal Formation	A carid	
Palaeobresilia	P. kurthetriegeri	Eichstätt, Schamhaupten	Altmühltal Formation,Painten Formation	The oldest known member of the bresiloidea	

==== Astacidea ====
Genus	Species	Locality	Formation	Notes	Images
Pseudastacus	P. pustulosus	Eichstätt, Ettling	Altmühltal Formation	A stenochirid	
Pseudastacus	P. muensteri	Eichstätt	Altmühltal Formation	A stenochirid	
Stenochirus	S. angustus	Zandt	Painten Formation	A stenochirid	
Stenochirus	S. mayeri	Solnhofen, Eichstätt, Daiting	Mörnsheim Formation, Altmühltal Formation	A stenochirid	
Malmuncina	M. wulfi	Eichstätt, Zandt	Altmühltal Formation, Painten Formation	A uncinid	
Uncina	U. ultima	Blumenberg	Altmühltal Formation	A uncinid	

==== Glypheidea ====
Genus	Species	Locality	Formation	Notes	Images
Eryma	E. elongatum	Eichstätt	Altmühltal Formation	A erymid	
Eryma	E. modestiforme	Solnhofen, Eichstätt, Zandt	Altmühltal Formation, Painten Formation	A erymid	
Eryma	E. punctatum	Eichstätt, Painten, Zandt, Breitenhill	Altmühltal Formation, Painten Formation	A erymid	
Eryma	E. verrucosa	Eichstätt, Painten, Hienheim	Altmühltal Formation, Painten Formation	A erymid	
Eryma	(Galicia)E. veltheimii	Painten, Kelheim	Painten Formation	A erymid	
Erymastacus	E. major	Eichstätt	Altmühltal Formation	A erymid	
Palaeastacus	P. fuciformis	Solnhofen, Eichstätt, Schernfeld, Zandt	Altmühltal Formation, Painten Formation	A erymid	
Palaeastacus	P. poeschli	Mühlheim	Mörnsheim Formation	A erymid	
Palaeastacus	P. rothgaengerae	Brunn	Torleite Formation	A erymid	
Pustulina	P. minuta	Solnhofen, Eichstätt	Altmühltal Formation	A erymid	
Pustulina	P. suevica	Eichstätt, Painten	Altmühltal Formation, Painten Formation	A erymid	
Stenodactylina	S. devillezi	Schernfeld	Altmühltal Formation	A erymid	
Gigacerina	G. saemanni	Brunn	Torleite Formation	A glypheid	
Glyphea	G. jurensis	Solnhofen	Altmühltal Formation	A glypheid	
Glyphea	G. pseudoscyllarus	Eichstätt, Schernfeld, Painten, Zandt, Breitenhill	Altmühltal Formation, Painten Formation	A glypheid	
Glyphea	G. veltheimi	Solnhofen	Altmühltal Formation	A glypheid	
Glyphea	G. viohli	Solnhofen, Eichstätt	Altmühltal Formation	A glypheid	
Glyphea	G. nov. spec. (Type A)	Solnhofen, Eichstätt, Schernfeld	Altmühltal Formation	A glypheid	
Glyphea	G. nov. spec. (Type B)	Eichstätt, Zandt	Altmühltal Formation, Painten Formation	A glypheid	
Glypheopsis	G. tenuis	Painten, Zandt	Painten Formation	A glypheid	
Squamosoglyphea	S. redenbacheri			A glypheid	
Squamosoglyphea	S. squamosa	Kelheim	Painten Formation	A glypheid	
Squamosoglyphea	S. rogeri			A glypheid	
Mecochirus	M. longimanatus	Solnhofen, Eichstätt	Altmühltal Formation	A mecochirid M. bajeri and M. brevimanus represent females of M. longimanatus	

==== Thalassinidae ====
Genus	Species	Locality	Formation	Notes	Images
Aperiopyxis	A. wulfetzergiebeli	Eichstätt	Altmühltal Formation	a axiid?	
Etallonia	E. longimana	Solnhofen, Zandt	Altmühltal Formation, Painten Formation	a axiid?	
Etallonia	E. hoellorum			a axiid?	
Etallonia	E. raineralberti	Brunn	Torleite Formation	a axiid?	
Magila	M. deformis			a axiid?	
Magila	M. desmarestii	Solnhofen, Eichstätt, Wegscheid	Altmühltal Formation	a axiid?	
Magila	M. latimana	Eichstätt, Zandt	Altmühltal Formation, Painten Formation	a axiid?	
Megachela	M. frickhingeri	Eichstätt, Breitenhill	Altmühltal Formation, Painten Formation	a axiid?	
Reschia	R. barbarea	Eichstätt	Altmühltal Formation	indeterminate thalassinidaen	

==== Polychelida ====
Genus	Species	Locality	Formation	Notes	Images
Coleia	C. longipes	Eichstätt	Altmühltal Formation	A coleiid	
Palaeopentacheles	P. roettenbacheri	Eichstätt, Wegscheid	Altmühltal Formation	A palaeopentachelid	
Cycleryon	C. elongatus	Zandt, Breitenhill	Painten Formation	A eryonid	
Cycleryon	C. orbiculatus	Eichstätt, Schernfeld, Painten, Mühlheim	Mörnsheim Formation,Altmühltal Formation, Painten Formation	A eryonid C. subrotundus is a juvenile of this species	
Cycleryon	C. propinquus	Solnhofen, Eichstätt	Altmühltal Formation	A eryonid C. spinimanus is a female form of this species	
Cycleryon	C. wulfi	Eichstätt	Altmühltal Formation	A eryonid	
Eryon	E. cuvieri	Solnhofen, Eichstätt, Langenaltheim	Altmühltal Formation	A eryonid	
Adamanteryon	A. fourneti	Painten	Painten Formation	A eryonid	
Knebelia	K. bilobata	Eichstätt, Wegscheid	Altmühltal Formation	A eryonid	
Knebelia	K. schuberti	Painten	Painten Formation	A eryonid	
Rogeryon	R. oppeli	Eichstätt	Altmühltal Formation	A eryonid	
Soleryon	S. schorri	Wattendorf	Torleite Formation	A eryonid	
Soleryon	S. sp	Zandt	Painten Formation	A eryonid	
Palinurina	P. longipes	Eichstätt, Wegscheid, Painten, Zandt	Altmühltal Formation, Painten Formation	A palinurid Phyllosoma is the larval form of this genus	
Palinurina	P. tenera	Eichstätt	Altmühltal Formation	A palinurid	
Phalangites	P. priscus	Eichstätt, Zandt	Altmühltal Formation, Painten Formation	larvae of a palinurid	
Cancrinos	C. claviger	Eichstätt, Langenaltheim, Painten, Mühlheim	Mörnsheim Formation, Altmühltal Formation, Painten Formation	A cancrinid	

==== Anomura ====
Genus	Species	Locality	Formation	Notes	Images
Aulavescus	A. paintenensis	Schamhaupten	Painten Formation	A galatheoidean	
Gastrosacus	G. wetzleri	Schamhaupten	Painten Formation	A galatheoidean	
Orhomalus	O. deformis	Solnhofen, Eichstätt	Altmühltal Formation	A hermit crab	
Paleopagurus	P. sp	Schamhaupten	Painten Formation	A hermit crab	

==== Brachyura ====
Genus	Species	Locality	Formation	Notes	Images
Abyssophthalmus	A. mirus	Zandt	Painten Formation	A longodromitid	
Bucculentum	B. arnosavelkouli	Mühlheim	Mörnsheim Formation	A bucculentid	
Goniodromites	G. serratus	Eichstätt, Painten, Schamhaupten, Breitenhill, Zandt	Altmühltal Formation, Painten Formation	A goniodromitid	
Pithonoton	P. marginatum	Zandt	Painten Formation	A goniodromitid	
Planoprosopon	P. heydeni	Schamhaupten	Painten Formation	A longodromitid	

== Other Arthropods ==
=== Xiphosura ===
Genus	Species	Locality	Formation	Notes	Images
Mesolimulus	M. walchi	Solnhofen, Eichstätt, Schernfeld, Wegscheid, Kelheim, Ettling	Altmühltal Formation, Painten Formation	A limulid often found associated with Trackways	

=== Pantopoda ===
Genus	Species	Locality	Formation	Notes	Images
Eurycide?	E. golem	Unknown	Altmühltal Formation	An ascorhynchid	
Colossopantopodus	C. nanus	Unknown	Altmühltal Formation	A colossendeidaen	

=== Thylacocephalans ===
Genus	Species	Locality	Formation	Notes	Images
Clausocaris	C. lithographica	Solnhofen, Eichstätt, Wegscheid	Altmühltal Formation	A clausocarid	
Dollocaris	D. michelorum	Wegscheid	Altmühltal Formation	A dollocarid	
Mayrocaris	M. bucculata	Solnhofen, Schernfeld, Zandt	Altmühltal Formation, Painten Formation	A dollocarid	
Falcatacaris	F. bastelbergeri	Solnhofen	Altmühltal Formation	A thylacocephalan	
Ovalicaris	O. wulforum	Blumenberg	Altmühltal Formation	A thylacocephalan	

== Other Invertebrata ==
Genus	Species	Locality	Formation	Notes	Images
Ammonella	A. quadrata	Pfalzpaint	Altmühltal Formation	Greatly resembles the Cambrian Protospongia	
Hruodospongia	H. lithographica	Wintershof	Altmühltal Formation	An axinellid sponge, the third sponge genus known from Solnhofen	
Neochoiaella	N. frattigianii	Langenaltheim	Altmühltal Formation	An extreme Lazarus taxon, resembles the Cambrian choiid sponges.	
