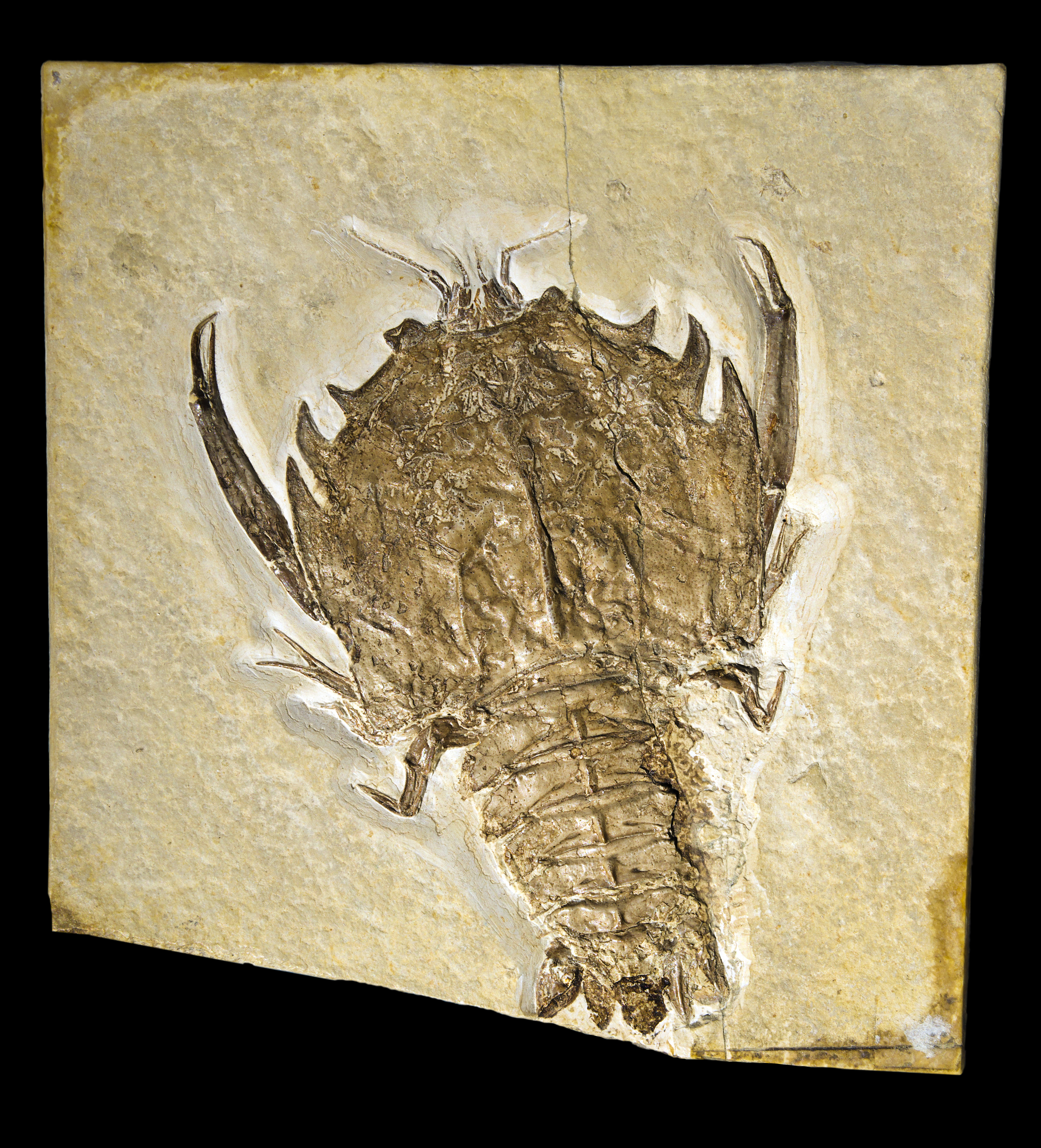
- Eryon cuvieri

Scientific classification
- Kingdom: Animalia
- Phylum: Arthropoda
- Class: Malacostraca
- Order: Decapoda
- Suborder: Pleocyemata
- Family: †Eryonidae
- Genus: †Eryon; A. G. Desmarest, 1817

= Eryon =

Eryon Temporal range: Late Jurassic

Extinct genus of crustaceans

Eryon is an extinct genus of decapod crustaceans from the Late Jurassic of Germany. Its remains are known from the Solnhofen limestone. It reached a length of around 10 cm (3.9 in), and may have fed on particulate matter on the sea bed. It went extinct sometime after the Late Jurassic, which ended approximately 145 million years ago (Ma). There is no specific date for the extinction of the Eryon genus itself mentioned in the records, only that its existence is confined to the fossil records of the Late Jurassic period.
