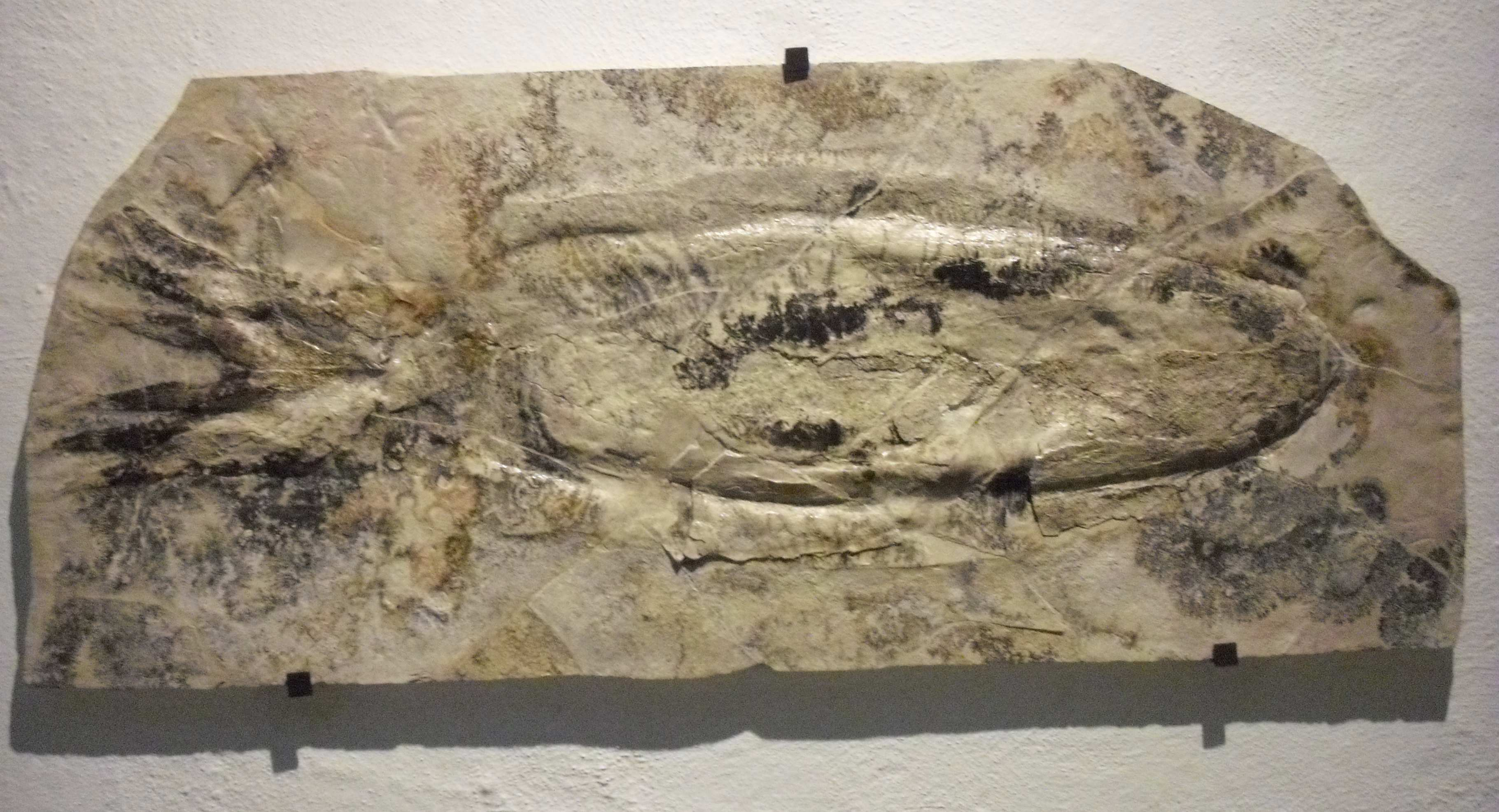

Scientific classification
- Domain: Eukaryota
- Kingdom: Animalia
- Phylum: Mollusca
- Class: Cephalopoda
- Order: Vampyromorphida
- Suborder: †Loligosepiina
- Family: †Leptotheuthidae
- Genus: †Leptotheuthis
- Species: †L. gigas

Binomial name
- †Leptotheuthis gigas Meyer, 1834

Synonyms
- Leptoteuthis d'Orbigny, 1845 (Unjustified Emendation)

= Leptotheuthis =

Extinct genus of molluscs

Leptotheuthis is a monospecific genus of cephalopod known primarily from gladii, with soft parts often preserved in the German Solnholfen limestone. The name is sometimes misspelled as Leptoteuthis, after an unjustified emendation published in 1845.
