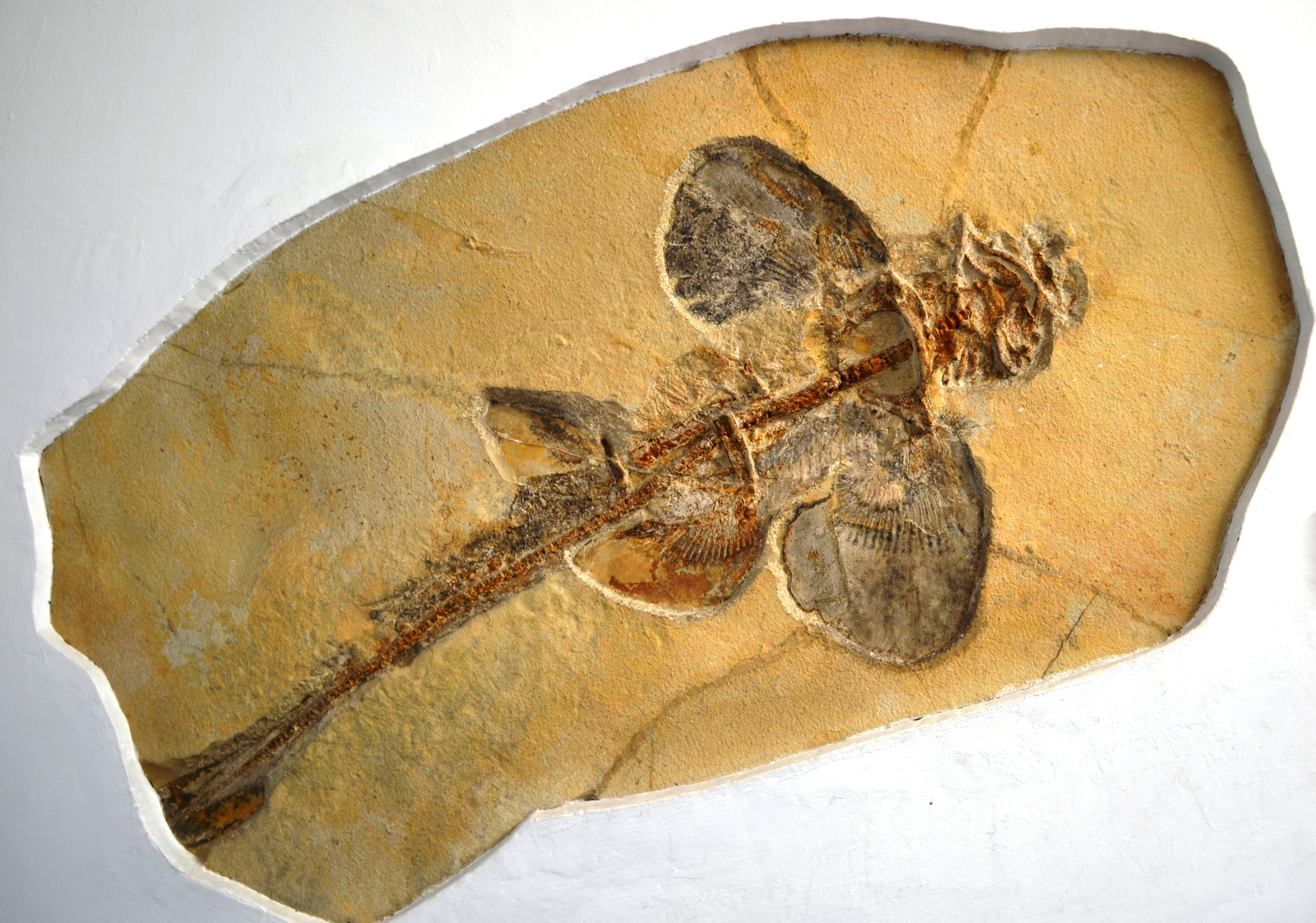
- Protospinax annectans

Scientific classification
- Kingdom: Animalia
- Phylum: Chordata
- Class: Chondrichthyes
- Subclass: Elasmobranchii
- Division: Selachii
- Superorder: Squalomorphi
- Genus: †Protospinax; Woodward, 1918

Type species
- †Protospinax annectans Woodward, 1918

Species
- †P. annectans Woodward, 1918; †P. carvalhoi Underwood & Ward, 2004; †P. lochensteinensis Thies, 1983; †P. planus Underwood, 2002

= Protospinax =

Protospinax Temporal range: Bathonian–Tithonian

Extinct genus of cartilaginous fishes

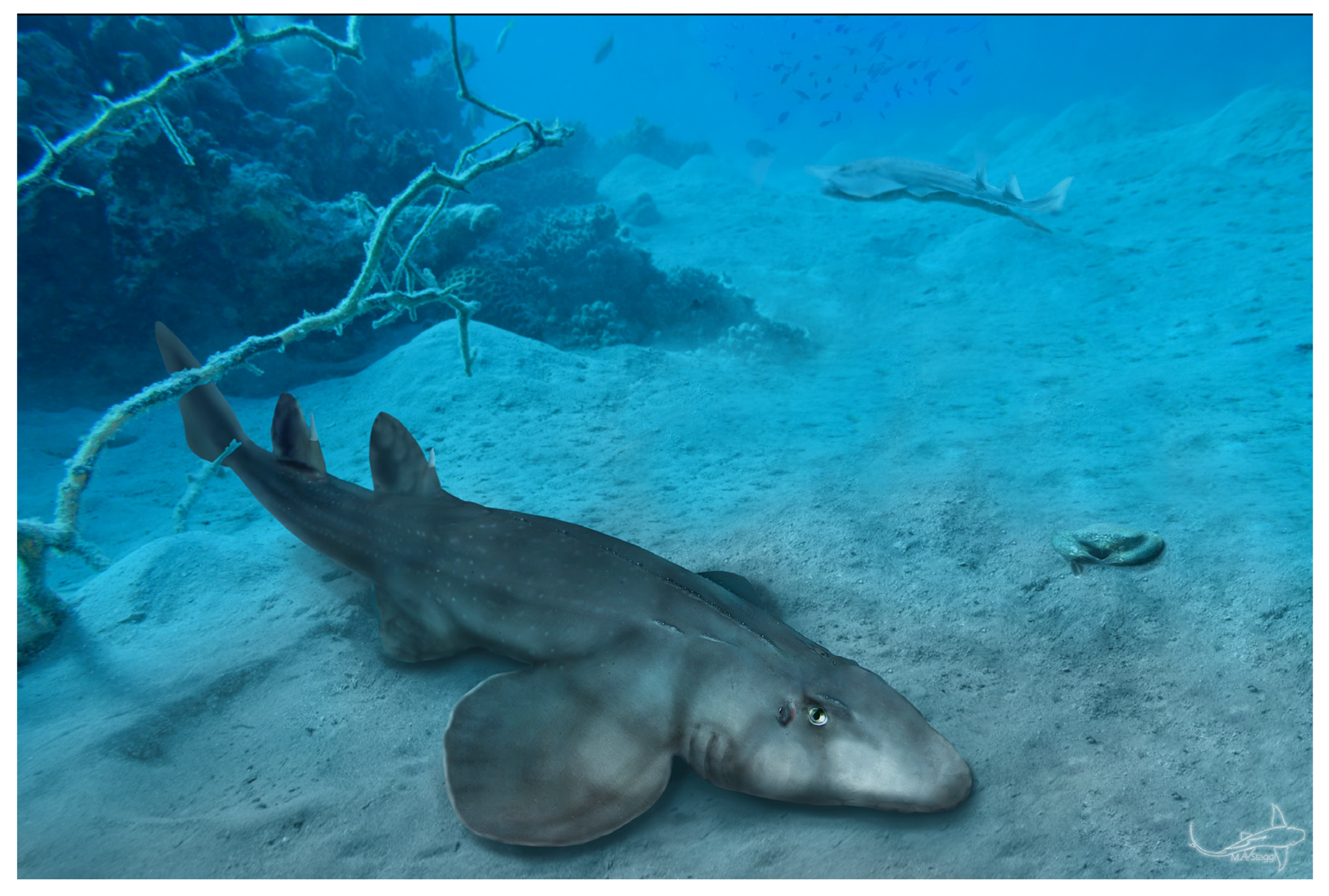
Life reconstruction of Protospinax annectans

Protospinax is an extinct genus of cartilaginous fish from the Middle to Late Jurassic of Europe and Russia. The type species, P. annectans, was found in the Solnhofen limestones of southern Bavaria. Formerly known from only two specimens, further museum specimens of P. annectans were discovered at the Museum of Comparative Zoology of Harvard University in the 1990s, having been misidentified as Squatina and Heterodontus. Six more species, all known only from isolated teeth, have been assigned to Protospinax, though only four including the type species remain valid. It was a relatively small shark, with the largest uncatalogued specimen of P. annectans measuring about 1.63 metres (5.3 ft) long.

Protospinax is a difficult taxon to accommodate in taxonomies. A 2023 study found it to be a squalomorph shark; one analysis placed it closest to angelsharks and sawsharks, but the authors concluded that its exact position within Squalomorphi is ultimately tentative due to a lack of unambiguous supporting traits.

In 2025, Begat and colleagues assigned three nominal species previously assigned to Protospinax to represent new genera. P. bilobatus has been reinterpreted as a junior synonym of P. magnus, which in turn has been given a new genus name Jurascyllium; the other species P. muftius has been given a separate genus name, Archaeoscyllium. They also suggested that the Early Jurassic (Toarcian) record likely represents an indeterminate species of Protospinax, and that among the putative Early Cretaceous records, only the Valanginian record from France can be reliably referred to this genus.
