= Alcmonacaris =

Alcmonacaris Temporal range: Upper Jurassic

Scientific classification
- Kingdom: Animalia
- Phylum: Arthropoda
- Clade: Pancrustacea
- Class: Malacostraca
- Order: Decapoda
- Suborder: Pleocyemata
- Infraorder: Caridea
- Family: incertae sedis
- Genus: †Alcmonacaris; Polz, 2009
- Species: †A. winkleri

Binomial name
- †Alcmonacaris winkleri Polz, 2009

Extinct genus of crustaceans

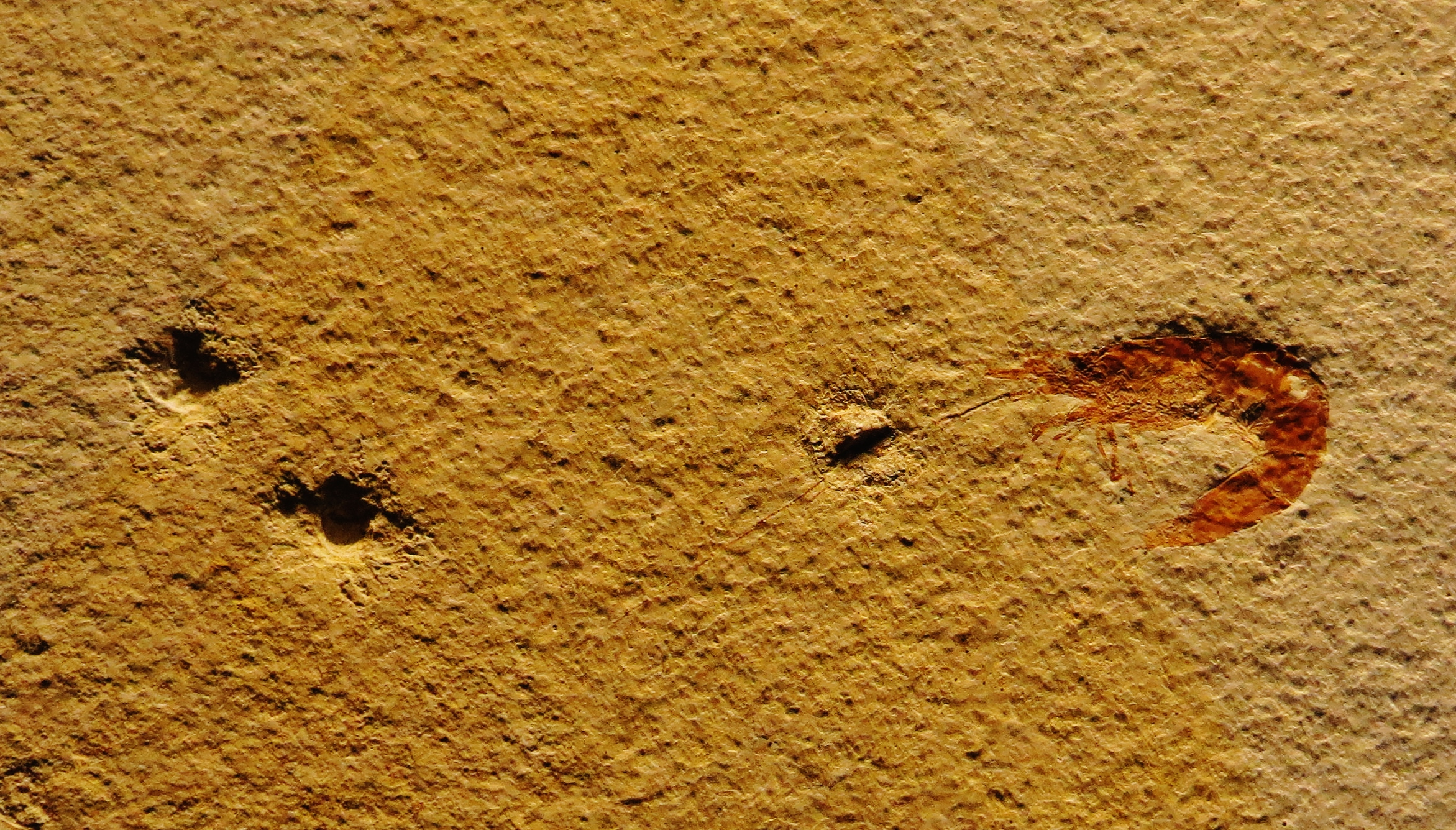
Alcmonacaris winkleri

Alcmonacaris winkleri is an extinct Late Jurassic species of shrimp in its own genus, Alcmonacaris, which cannot yet be placed in a family. It was described in 2009 from a specimen in the Solnhofen limestone.
