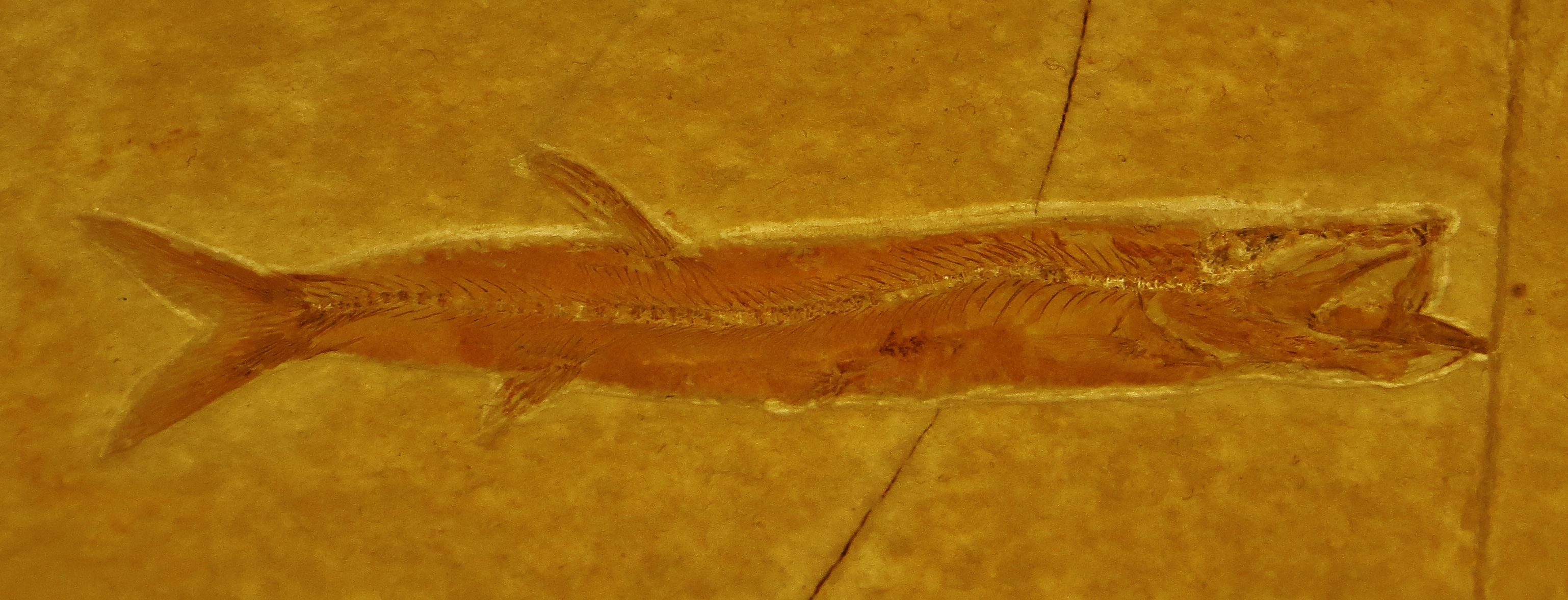
- Specimen at the Museum Bergér

Scientific classification
- Kingdom: Animalia
- Phylum: Chordata
- Class: Actinopterygii
- Order: Elopiformes
- Genus: †Eichstaettia; Arratia, 1987
- Species: †E. mayri

Binomial name
- †Eichstaettia mayri (Nybelin, 1967)

Synonyms
- Anaethalion mayri Nybelin, 1967

= Eichstaettia =

Eichstaettia Temporal range: Early Tithonian

Extinct genus of fishes

Eichstaettia ("of Eichstätt") is an extinct genus of marine ray-finned fish that lived during the early Tithonian stage of the Late Jurassic epoch. It contains a single species, E. mayri from the Eichstätt Formation of Germany, which is part of the wider Solnhofen Limestone. It was an early stem-group elopiform, making it distantly related to modern tarpons and ladyfish. It was initially described as a species of Anaethalion.

== See also ==
- Prehistoric fish
- List of prehistoric bony fish
