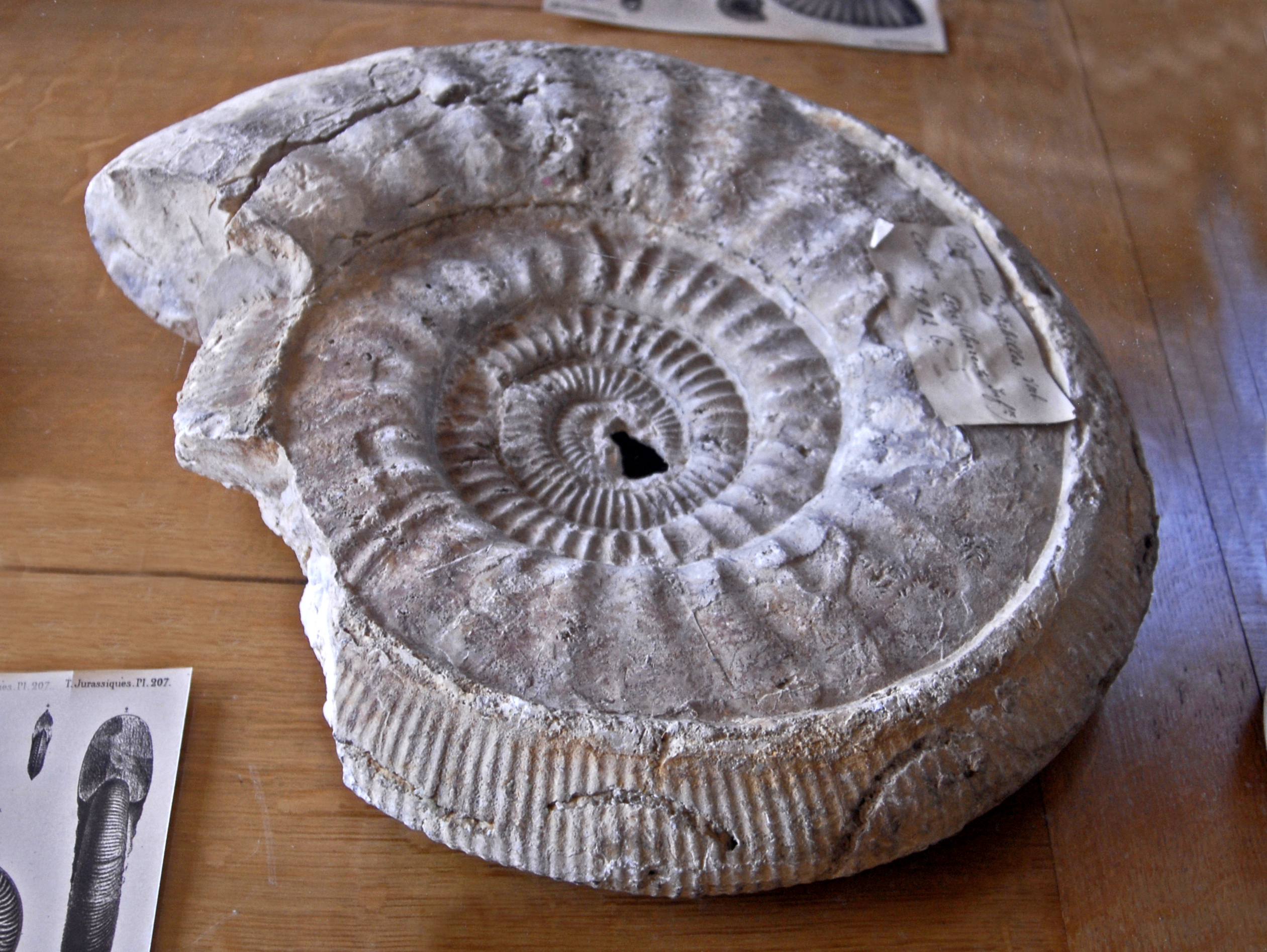
- Fossil of Lithacoceras achilles from France, on display at Galerie de paléontologie et d'anatomie comparée in Paris

Scientific classification
- Kingdom: Animalia
- Phylum: Mollusca
- Class: Cephalopoda
- Subclass: †Ammonoidea
- Order: †Ammonitida
- Superfamily: †Perisphinctoidea
- Family: †Ataxioceratidae; Buckman 1921

= Ataxioceratidae =

Ataxioceratidae Temporal range: from Jurassic to Cretaceous, 160–140.2 Ma

Extinct family of molluscs

Ataxioceratidae is an extinct Ammonite cephalopod family included in the superfamily Perisphinctoidea. These fast-moving nektonic carnivores lived during the Jurassic and Cretaceous periods.

== Genera ==
- Catutosphinctes
- Choicensisphinctes
- Katroliceras
- Lithacoceras
- Lithacosphinctes
- Orthosphinctes

== Distribution ==
Fossils of species within this genus have been found in the Cretaceous of Yemen, as well as in Jurassic sediments of Antarctica, Argentina, Canada, China, Cuba, France, Germany, Hungary, India, Iran, Italy, Madagascar, Nepal, Somalia, Spain, United States.
