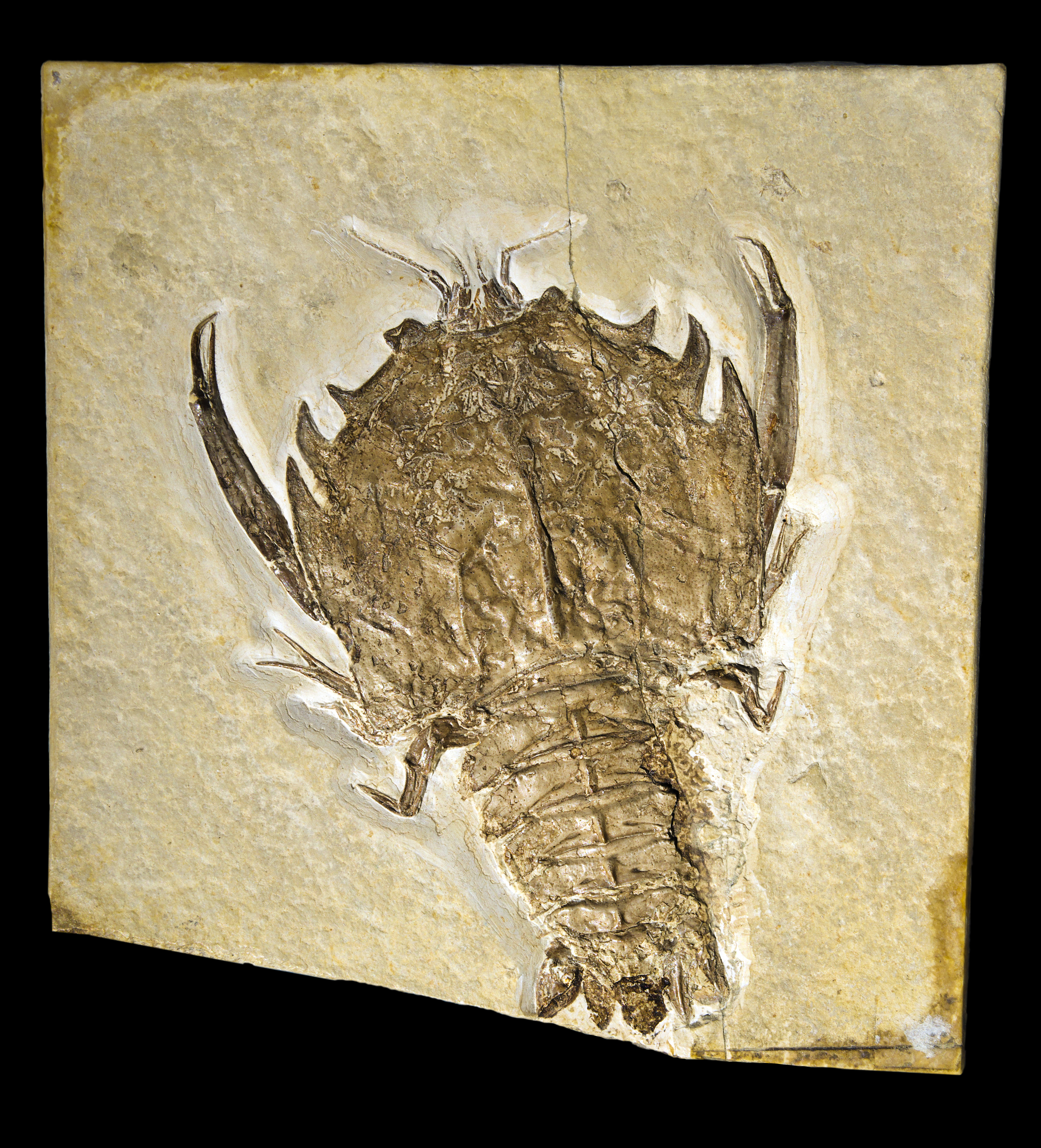
- Eryon acrtiformis

Scientific classification
- Kingdom: Animalia
- Phylum: Arthropoda
- Clade: Pancrustacea
- Class: Malacostraca
- Order: Decapoda
- Suborder: Pleocyemata
- Superfamily: Eryonoidea
- Family: †Eryonidae; De Haan, 1841

Genera
- Cycleryon; Eryon; Knebelia; Rosenfeldia

= Eryonidae =

Eryonidae Temporal range: Upper Triassic–Lower Cretaceous

Family of crustaceans

Eryonidae is a family of fossil decapod crustaceans which lived from the Upper Triassic to the Lower Cretaceous. It contains four genera: An aggregation of three unidentified eryonids was reported in 2012 inside a Late Jurassic ammonoid of the species Harpoceras falciferum; they represent the earliest evidence of gregarious behaviour in decapods.

- Cycleryon Glaessner, 1965
- Eryon A. G. Desmarest, 1817
- Knebelia Van Straelen, 1922
- Rosenfeldia Garassino, Teruzzi & Dalla Vecchia, 1996
