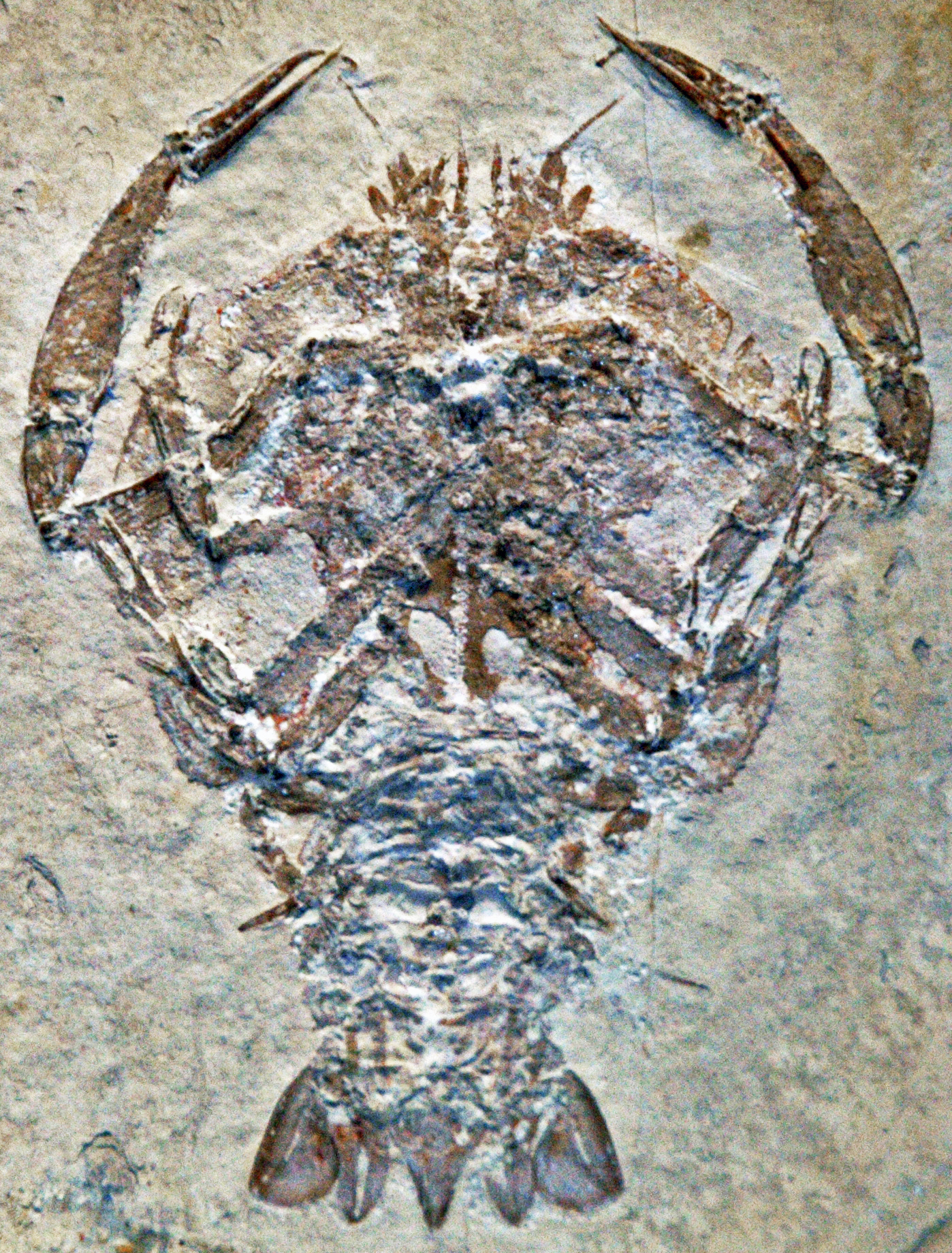
- Cycleryon propinquus from Germany, Carnegie Museum of Natural History, Pittsburgh

Scientific classification
- Domain: Eukaryota
- Kingdom: Animalia
- Phylum: Arthropoda
- Class: Malacostraca
- Order: Decapoda
- Suborder: Pleocyemata
- Family: †Eryonidae
- Genus: †Cycleryon; Glaessner, 1965

Type species
- †Macrourites propinquus von Schlotheim, 1822

Species
- C. propinquus (von Schlotheim, 1822); C. orbiculatus (Münster, 1839); C. elongatus (Münster, 1839); C. wulfi Garassino & Schweigert, 2004; C. bourseaui Audo et al., 2014

= Cycleryon =

Cycleryon Temporal range: Kimmeridgian–Tithonian

Extinct genus of crustaceans

Cycleryon is an extinct genus of decapod crustaceans. The type species is Cycleryon propinquus.

These epifaunal carnivores lived during the Late Jurassic (Kimmeridgian-Tithonian) of Germany and France.

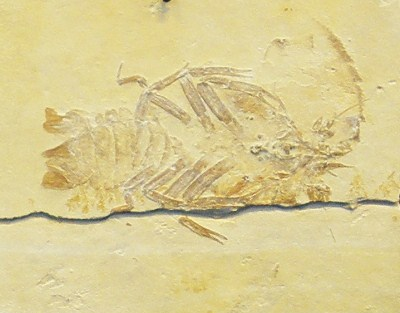
Cycleryon orbiculatus
