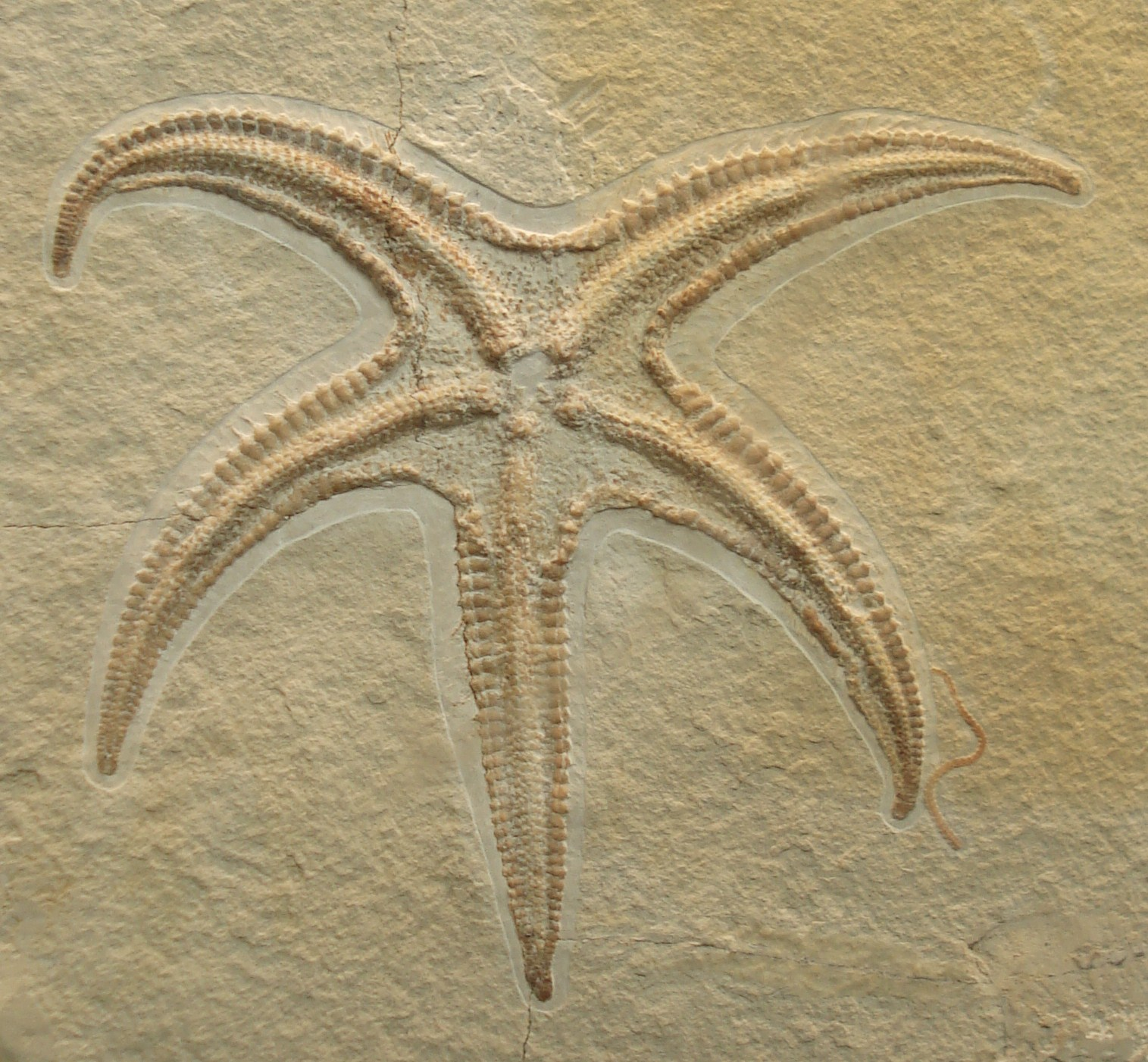

Scientific classification
- Kingdom: Animalia
- Phylum: Echinodermata
- Class: Asteroidea
- Order: Paxillosida
- Family: Astropectinidae
- Genus: † Riedaster Kutscher and Röper, 1999
- Species: † R. reicheli

Binomial name
- † Riedaster reicheli Kutscher and Röper, 1999

= Riedaster =

Riedaster reicheli Temporal range: late Jurassic

Extinct species of starfish

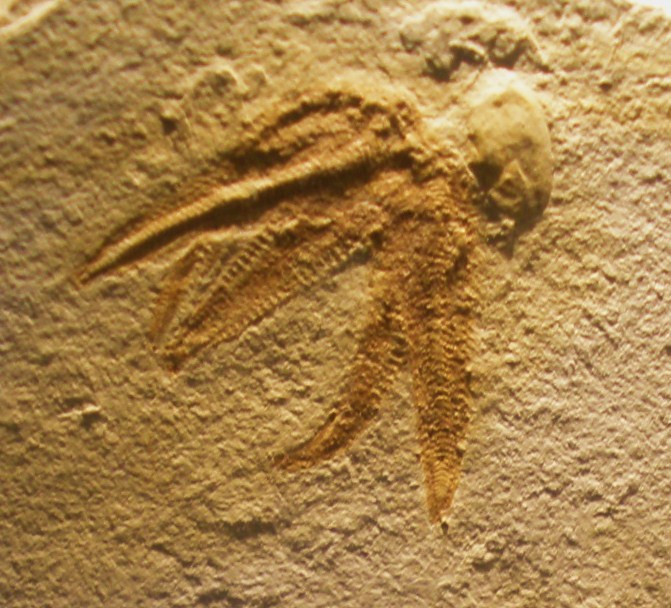
Whole body fossil of Riedaster reicheli

Riedaster reicheli is an extinct species of starfish in the family Astropectinidae, and the only species in the genus Riedaster. Riedaster reicheli was first described by Kutscher and Röper in 1999 from a three-dimensional body fossil. Its type locality is Papierschiefer, which is in a shallow subtidal mudstone in the Papierschiefer Formation in the Ried district of Germany. It is the type species of the genus Riedaster and dates back to the Late Jurassic.
