= Solnhofen Limestone =

Geological formation preserving rare fossils in Germany

Altmühltal Formation
- Stratigraphic range: Tithonian
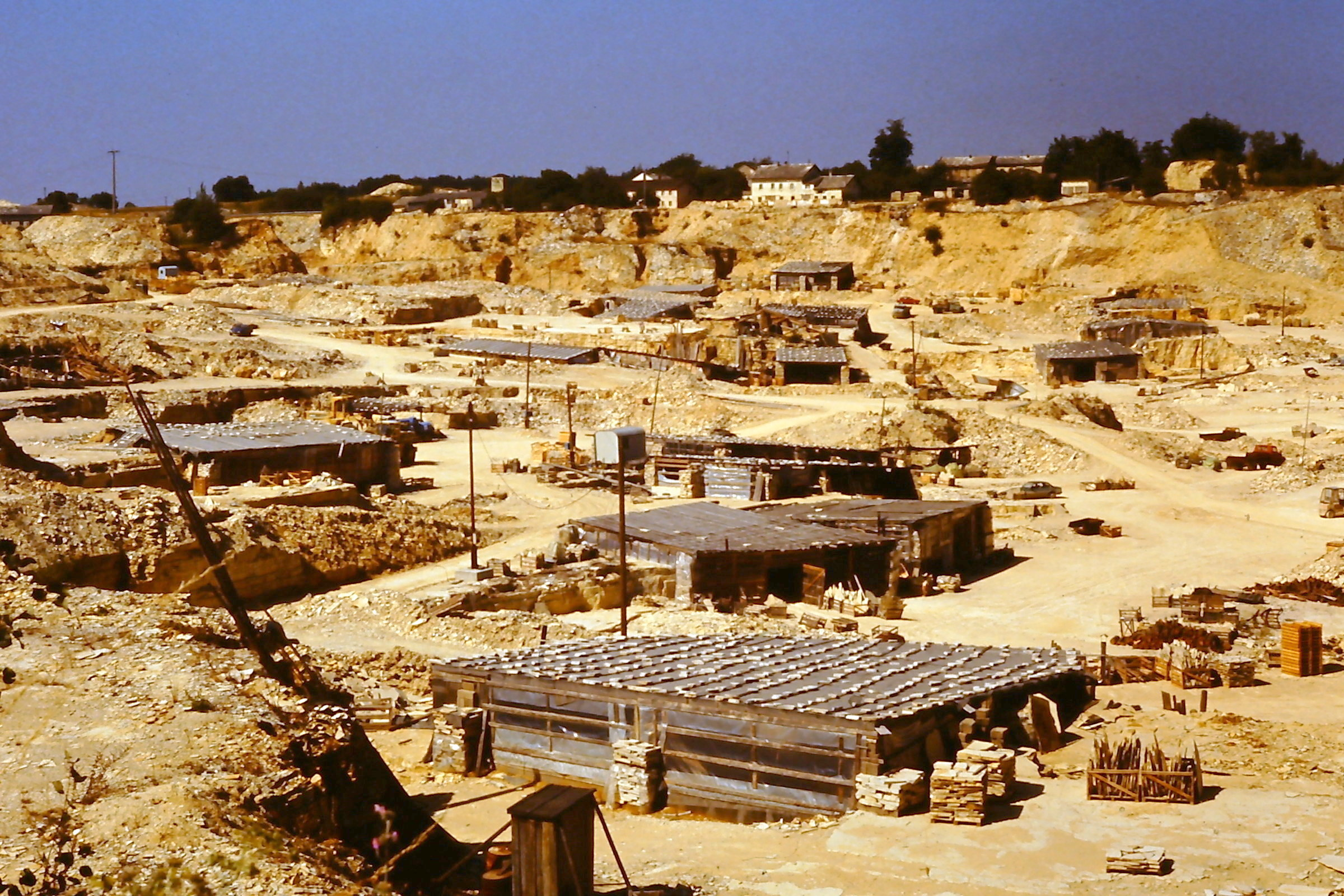
- Outcrop of the Solnhofen Limestone
- Type: Geological formation
- Underlies: Mörnsheim Formation
- Overlies: Rögling Formation

Lithology
- Primary: Lithographic limestone

Location
- Coordinates: 48.9000°N 11.0000°E
- Approximate paleocoordinates: 40.1°N 19.2°E
- Region: Bavaria
- Country: Germany

Type section
- Named for: Solnhofen
- Solnhofen Limestone (Germany) Solnhofen Limestone (Bavaria)

The Solnhofen Limestone or Solnhofen Plattenkalk, formally known as the Altmühltal Formation, is a Jurassic Konservat-Lagerstätte that preserves a rare assemblage of fossilized organisms, including highly detailed imprints of soft bodied organisms such as sea jellies. The most familiar fossils of the Solnhofen Plattenkalk include the early feathered theropod dinosaur Archaeopteryx preserved in such detail that they are among the most famous and most beautiful fossils in the world. The Solnhofen beds lie in the German state of Bavaria (Bayern), halfway between Nuremberg (Nürnberg) and Munich (München) and were originally quarried as a source of lithographic limestone. The Jura Museum situated in Eichstätt, Germany has an extensive exhibit of Jurassic fossils from the quarries of Solnhofen and surroundings, including marine reptiles, pterosaurs, and one specimen of the early bird Archaeopteryx.

== Paleoenvironment and preservation ==
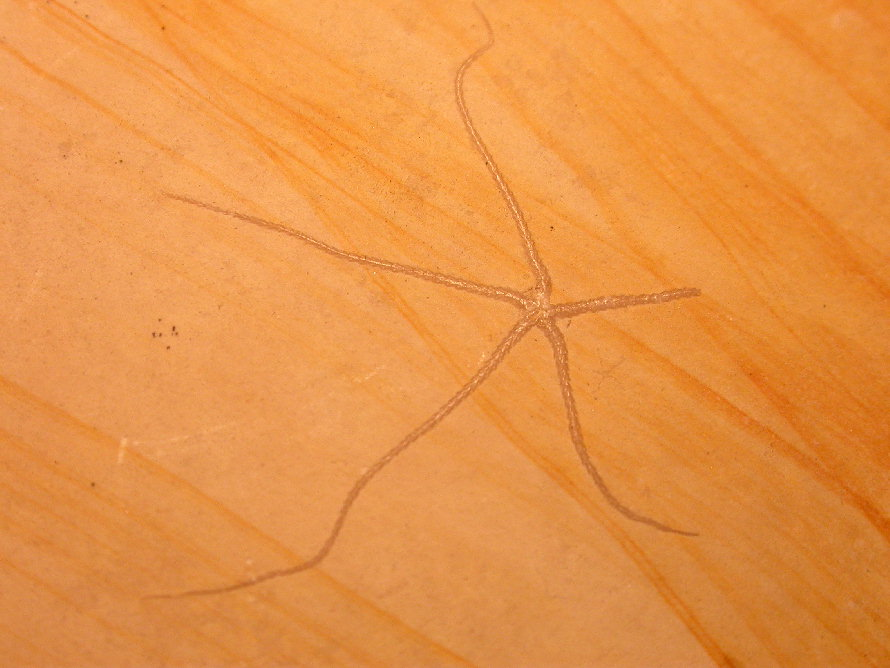
A brittle star fossil from the Solnhofen Limestone

During the Late Jurassic, this area was an archipelago at the edge of the Tethys Sea. This included placid lagoons that had limited access to the open sea and where salinity rose high enough that the resulting brine could not support life. Since the lowest water was devoid of oxygen, many ordinary scavengers were absent. Any organism that fell, drifted, or was washed into the lagoons from the ocean or the land became buried in soft carbonate mud. Thus, many delicate creatures avoided consumption by scavengers or being torn apart by currents. The wings of dragonflies, the imprints of stray feathers, and terrestrial plants that washed into the lagoons were all preserved. The fossils are not numerous, but some of them are spectacular, and their range gives a comprehensive picture of a local Jurassic ecosystem.

At times, the lagoons almost dried out, exposing sticky carbonate muds that trapped insects and a few small dinosaurs. Over 600 species have been identified, including twenty-nine kinds of pterosaur ranging from the size of a sparrow to 1.2 m (4 ft) in length.

The fine-grained texture of the mud silt forming the limestone from the Solnhofen area (which is composed mainly of the towns of Solnhofen and Eichstätt) is ideal for making lithographic plates, and extensive quarrying in the 19th century revealed many fossil finds, as commemorated in the name Archaeopteryx lithographica, all the specimens of which come from these deposits. The closest modern analogue to the Solnhofen conditions is said to be Orca Basin in the northern Gulf of Mexico, though that area is much deeper than the Solnhofen lagoons.

=== IUGS geological heritage site ===
In respect of the locality being a 'first-class paleontological site displaying high-quality reference material for scientists worldwide, including all known specimens of Archaeopteryx ', the International Union of Geological Sciences (IUGS) included the 'Jurassic Solnhofen-Eichstätt Archaeopteryx Serial Site' in its assemblage of 100 'geological heritage sites' around the world in a listing published in October 2022. The organisation defines an IUGS Geological Heritage Site as 'a key place with geological elements and/or processes of international scientific relevance, used as a reference, and/or with a substantial contribution to the development of geological sciences through history.'

== Paleobiota ==
Significant members of the Solnhofen paleofauna include Archaeopteryx, pterosaurs, and marine invertebrates.

== Psilomelane dendrites ==
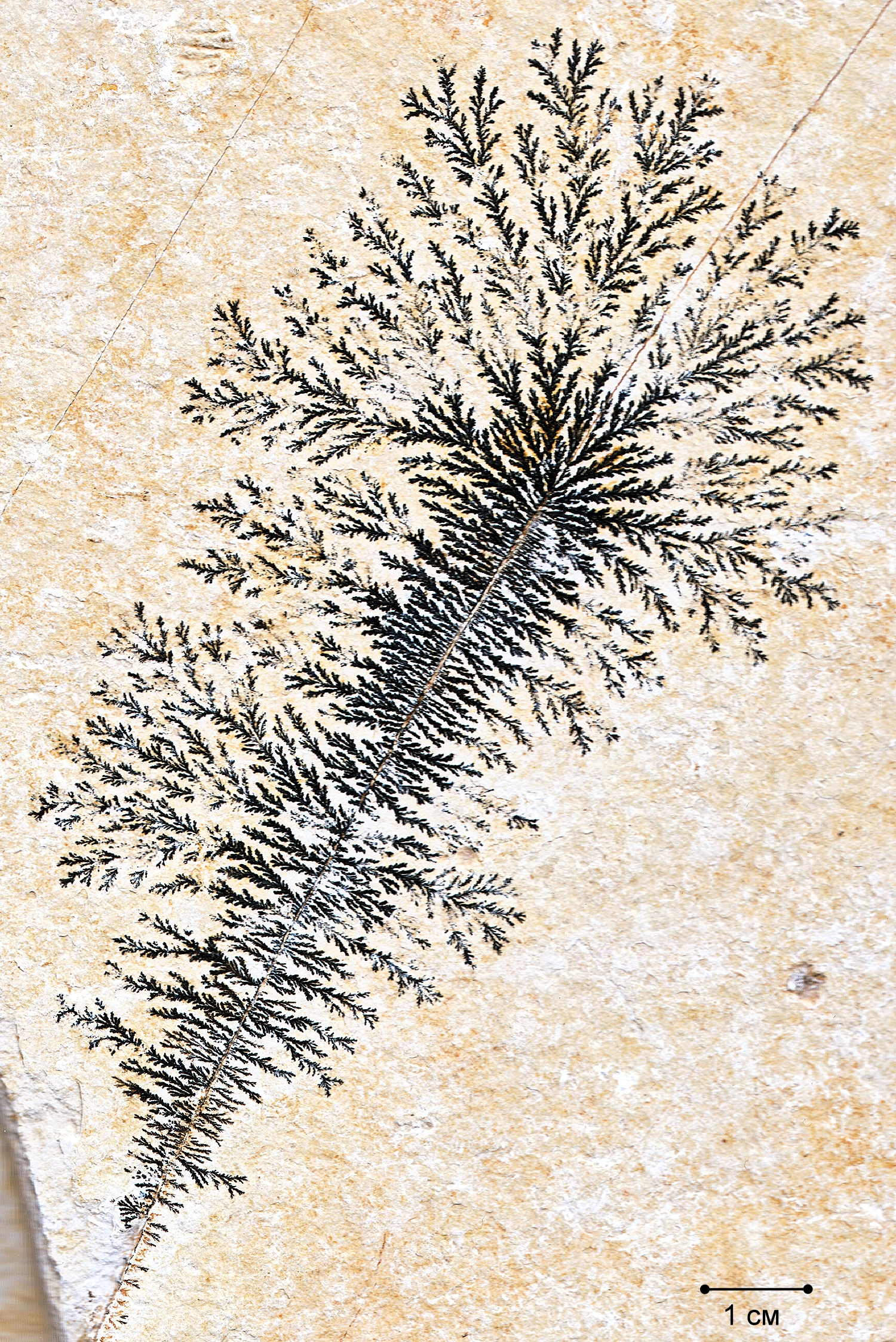
Dendrites associated with a fissure on a bedding plane.

Dendrites, branched dark brown to black fractal tree-structure, are quite common in the limestone. Such formations are not plant fossil remains, but iron and manganese oxides (psilomelane, (Ba,H_{2}O)_{2}Mn_{5}O_{10}) that crystallized out of solutions on bedding planes of the Solnhofen limestone. Dendrites have a chemical-mineralogical origin and are formed by a diffusion process.

== Cultural items made from Solnhofen Limestone ==
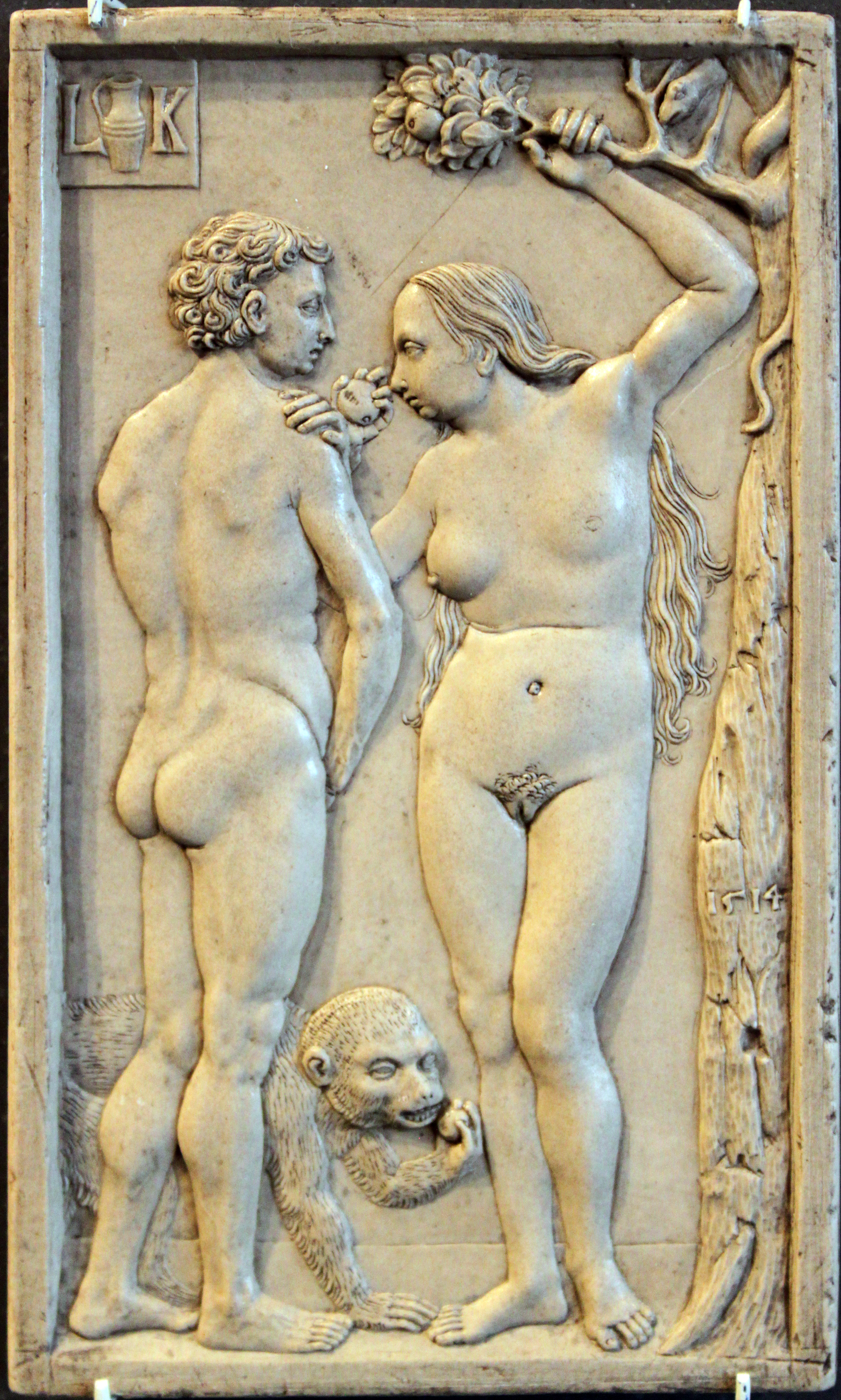
Adam and Eve (Fall of Man), 1514 by Ludwig Krug, Bode-Museum Berlin

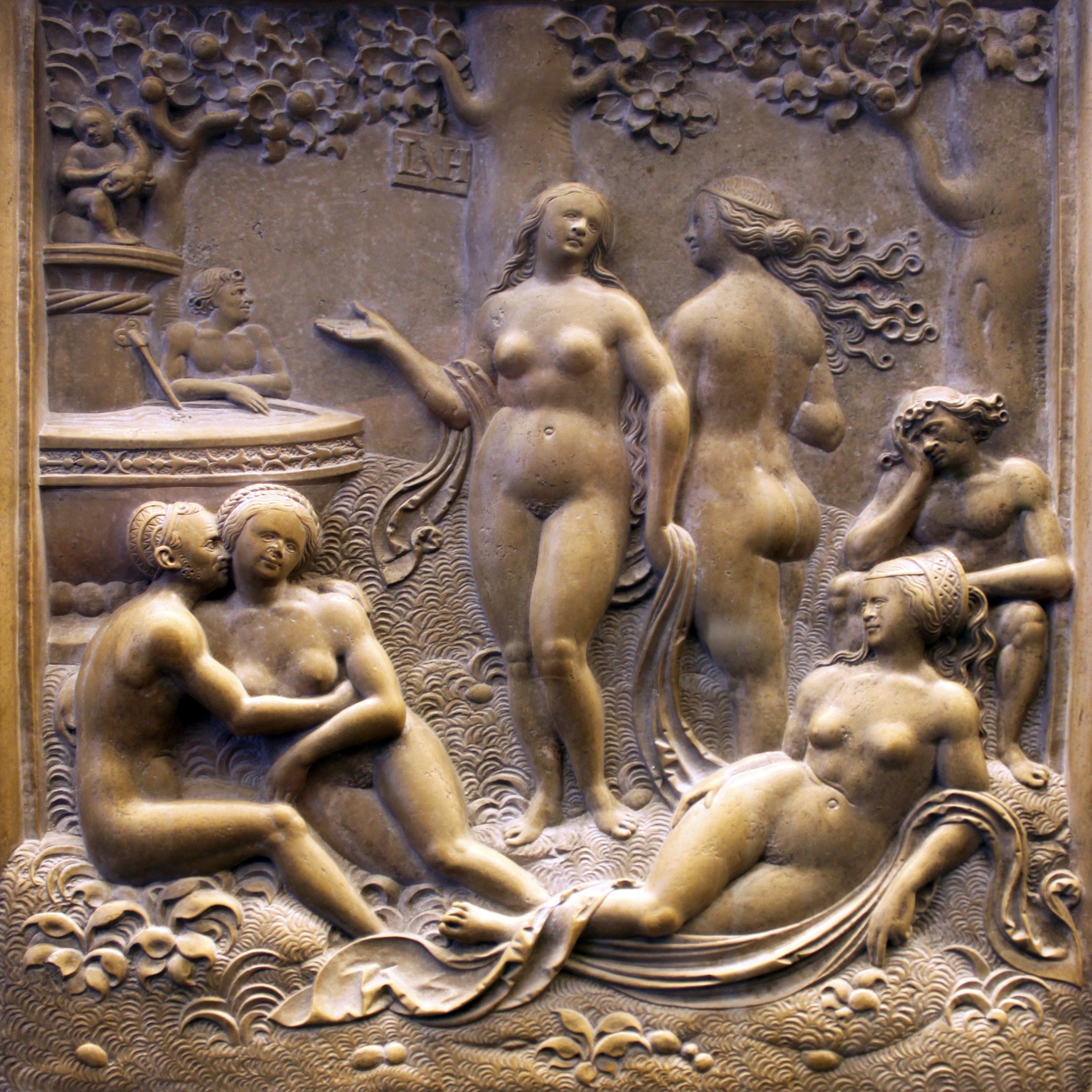
Garden of Love/Fountain of Youth, 1525 by Loy Hering (Bode-Museum Berlin)

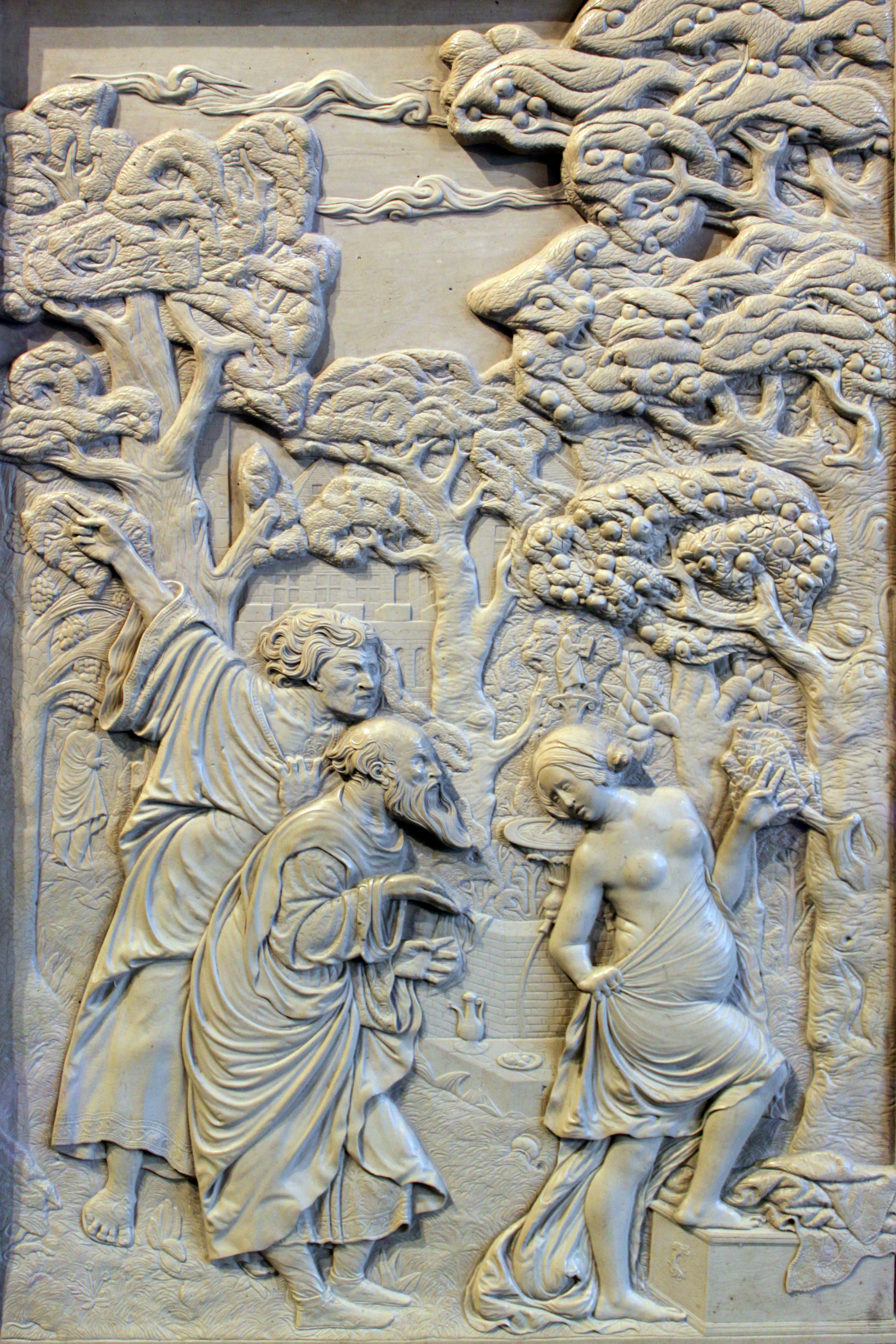
Susannah and the Elders, 1530 by Victor Kayser (Bode-Museum Berlin)

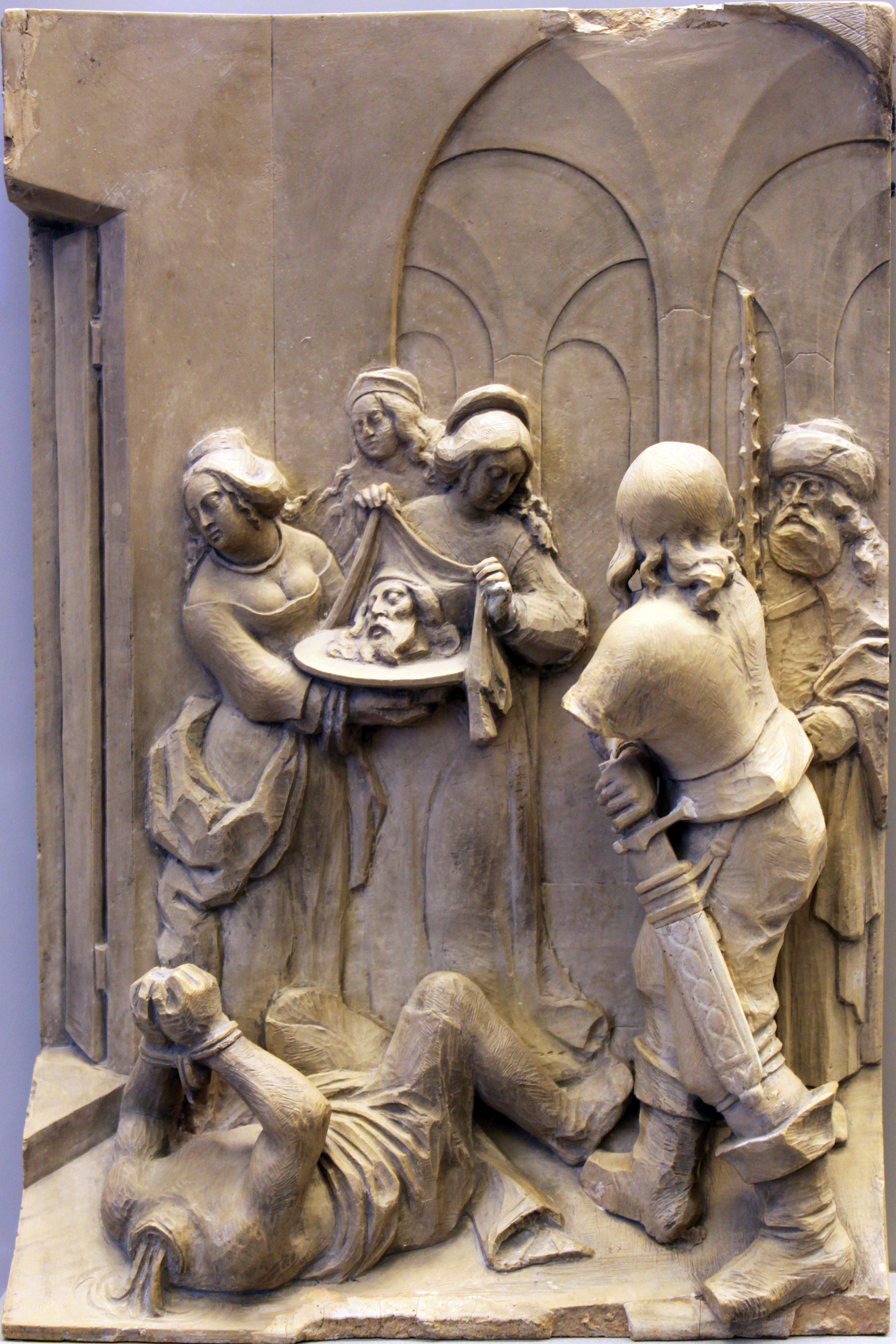
Salome Receives the Head of St. John the Baptist in the Dungeon, 1648 by Georg Schweigger

== See also ==
- Jura Museum
- List of fossil sites (with link directory)
- List of types of limestone
- List of dinosaur-bearing rock formations
- South German Jurassic
