= 1839 in paleontology =

Paleontology or palaeontology is the study of prehistoric life forms on Earth through the examination of plant and animal fossils. This includes the study of body fossils, tracks (ichnites), burrows, cast-off parts, fossilised feces (coprolites), palynomorphs and chemical residues. Because humans have encountered fossils for millennia, paleontology has a long history both before and after becoming formalized as a science. This article records significant discoveries and events related to paleontology that occurred or were published in the year 1839.

== Arthropods ==
=== Crustaceans ===
Name	Novelty	Status	Authors	Age	Unit	Location	Notes	Images
Aeger	Gen. et. sp. nov.	Valid	Münster	Late Jurassic (Tithonian)	Solnhofen Limestone	Germany	An aegerid, type species is A. spinipes.	
Antrimpos	Valid	Jr synonym	Münster	Late Jurassic (Tithonian)	Solnhofen Limestone	Germany	A penaeid, type species is A. speciosus.	
Aura	Gen. et. sp. nov.	Valid	Münster	Late Jurassic (Tithonian)	Solnhofen Limestone	Germany	Type species is A. desmarestii, now a junior synonym of Eryma.	
Blaculla	Gen. et. sp. nov.	Valid	Münster	Late Jurassic (Tithonian)	Solnhofen Limestone	Germany	Type species is B. nikoides.	
Bolina	Gen. et. sp. nov.	Jr synonym	Münster	Late Jurassic (Tithonian)	Solnhofen Limestone	Germany	Type species is B. pustulosa, now a junior synonym of Pseudastacus pustulosus. The species B. angusta was also assigned, and is now a junior synonym of Stenochirus angustus.	
Bombur	Gen. et. sp. nov.	Valid	Münster	Late Jurassic (Tithonian)	Solnhofen Limestone	Germany	A penaeid, type species is B. complicatus.	
Brisa	Gen. et. sp. nov.	Jr synonym	Münster	Late Jurassic (Tithonian)	Solnhofen Limestone	Germany	Type species is B. lucida, now a junior synonym of Glyphea pseudoscyllarus.	
Brome	Gen. et. sp. nov.	Valid	Münster	Late Jurassic (Tithonian)	Solnhofen Limestone	Germany	An indeterminate decapod, type species is B. ventrosa.	Its unclear how it looked like...
Bylgia	Gen. et. sp. nov.	Valid	Münster	Late Jurassic (Tithonian)	Solnhofen Limestone	Germany	A penaeid, type species is B. hexadon.	
Cancrinos	Gen. et. sp. nov.	Valid	Münster	Late Jurassic (Tithonian)	Solnhofen Limestone	Germany	A cancrinid, type species is C. claviger.	
Drobna	Gen. et. sp. nov.	Valid	Münster	Late Jurassic (Tithonian)	Solnhofen Limestone	Germany	A penaeid, type species is D. deformis.	
Dusa	Gen. et. sp. nov.	Valid	Münster	Late Jurassic (Tithonian)	Solnhofen Limestone	Germany	A penaeid, type species is D. monocera.	
Elder	Gen. et. sp. nov.	Valid	Münster	Late Jurassic (Tithonian)	Solnhofen Limestone	Germany	Type species is E. ungulatus.	
Hefriga	Gen. et. sp. nov.	Valid	Münster	Late Jurassic (Tithonian)	Solnhofen Limestone	Germany	Type species is H. serrata.	
Kolga	Gen. et. sp. nov.	Jr synonym	Münster	Late Jurassic (Tithonian)	Solnhofen Limestone	Germany	Type species is K. quindens, now a junior synonym of Antrimpos.	
Magila	Gen. et. sp. nov.	Valid	Münster	Jurassic	Solnhofen Limestone	Germany	An axiid, type species is M. latimana.	
Orphnea	Gen. et. comb. nov.	Jr synonym	Münster	Late Jurassic (Tithonian)	Solnhofen Limestone	Germany	Type species is O. pseudoscyllarus, now assigned to Glyphea.	
Palinurina	Gen. et. sp. nov.	Valid	Münster	Late Jurassic (Tithonian)	Solnhofen Limestone	Germany	An palinurid, type species is P. longipes.	
Rauna	Gen. et. sp. nov.	Valid	Münster	Late Jurassic (Tithonian)	Solnhofen Limestone	Germany	A penaeid, includes the species R. angusta.	
Udora	Gen. et. sp. nov.	Valid	Münster	Late Jurassic (Tithonian)	Solnhofen Limestone	Germany	Type species is U. brevispina.	

== Archosaurs ==
=== Newly named pseudosuchians ===
Data courtesy of George Olshevsky's dinosaur genera list.

Name	Status	Authors	Notes
Ephoenosaurus	Nomen nudum	Anonymous	In addition to never being formally described, it may be a subjective synonym of the crocodilian Machimosaurus

=== Pterosaurs ===
- Graf Munster received a complete skeleton of "Pterodactylus" munsteri which revealed the presence of a long bony tail in this species.

== Paleontologists ==
- Birth of Harry Govier Seeley, the paleontologist who invented the Saurischian/Ornithischian dinosaur dichotomy.
