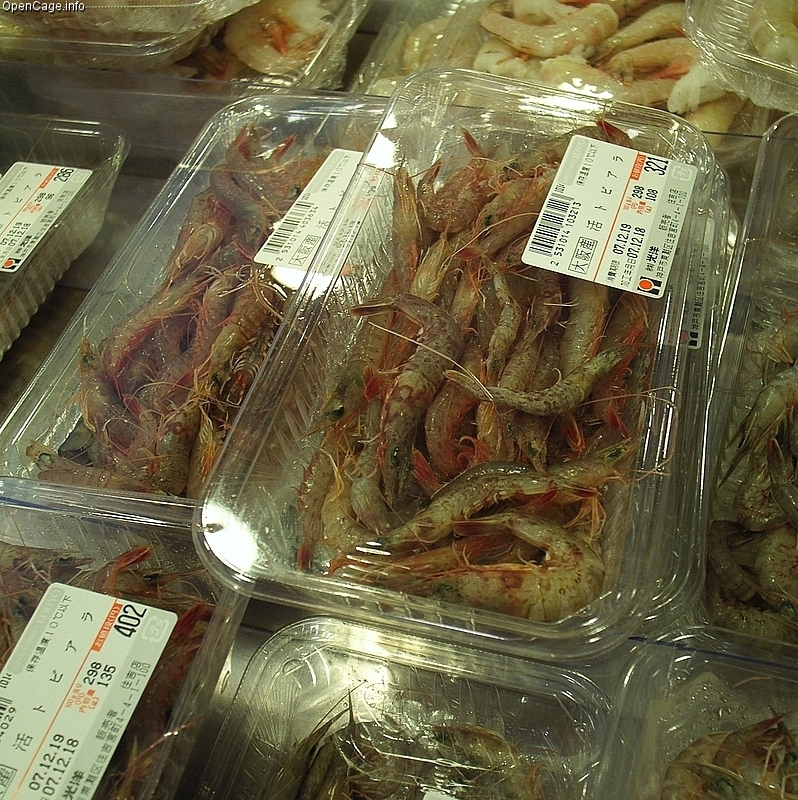
- Trachysalambria curvirostris for sale at a market

Scientific classification
- Kingdom: Animalia
- Phylum: Arthropoda
- Clade: Pancrustacea
- Class: Malacostraca
- Order: Decapoda
- Suborder: Dendrobranchiata
- Family: Penaeidae
- Genus: Trachysalambria
- Species: T. curvirostris

Binomial name
- Trachysalambria curvirostris (Stimpson, 1860)

Synonyms
- Metapenaeus palaestinensis Steinitz, 1932; Penaeus curvirostris Stimpson, 1860; Trachypenaeus curvirostris (Stimpson, 1860); Trachysalambria palaestinensis (Steinitz, 1932)

= Trachysalambria curvirostris =

Species of crustacean

Trachysalambria curvirostris (formerly Trachypenaeus curvirostris) is a species of prawn that lives in shallow waters of the Indo-West Pacific. It is one of the most important species targeted by prawn fishery, with annual harvests of more than 300,000 t, mostly landed in China.

== Distribution and ecology ==
T. curvirostris is widely distributed across the Indo-West Pacific, from East Africa and the Red Sea to Japan and Australia. It has also entered the Mediterranean Sea as a Lessepsian migrant, through the Suez Canal. It lives at depths of 10–300 metres (33–984 ft) over sandy or muddy bottoms.

== Description ==
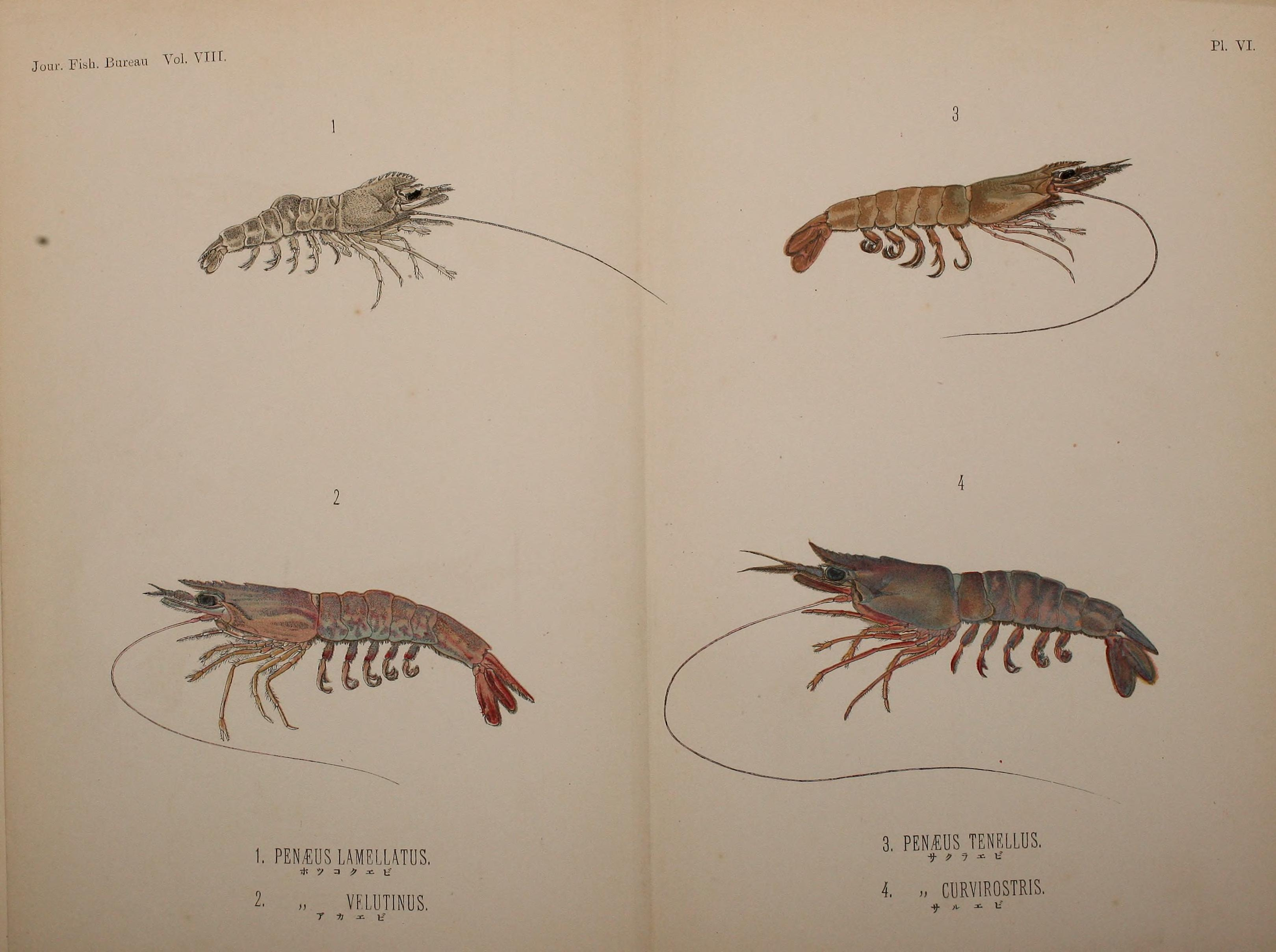
Fig. 4. Penaeus curvirostris now known as T. curvirostris.

Trachysalambria curvirostris is a small prawn, with males reaching a total length of up to 81 millimetres (3.2 in), and females reaching 105 mm (4.1 in). The exoskeleton is "densely pubescent" (covered in thick down). The rostrum is straight or slightly curved upwards, and bears 7–11 teeth on the dorsal (upper) side. The last four segments of the pleon have a median crest, while the second segment has a tubercle on the mid-line.

T. curvirostris can be distinguished from similar species that occur in the same areas (such as Megokris sedili and Megokris granulosus) by the form of the petasma and thelycum (male and female reproductive structures), and by the colouration of the uropods; these are red or reddish brown, with conspicuous white margins in T. curvirostris, but yellowish with grey or brown margins and centre in M. sedili, and red or reddish brown with golden margins in M. granulosus.

== Life cycle ==
The biology of T. curvirostris is poorly known; in the waters around Korea, mating takes place in June, July and August. Females lay up to 100,000 eggs, each one around 223 micrometres (0.0088 in) in diameter, with the female's fecundity being directly related to her body size. Over the next 15 hours, the eggs grow to 400 μm (0.016 in) in diameter; at this point, they hatch into the first nauplius larva.

The nauplii have only three pairs of appendages: two pairs of antennae, and the mandibles. The larva passes through a further five naupliar stages by ecdysis, with increasing numbers of setae (bristles) appearing on the appendages at each stage. Around 41 hours after hatching, the larva moults into the first protozoea stage, by which time the body is 0.732 millimetres (0.0288 in) long. The body is now differentiated into a cephalothorax and an abdomen, bears several thoracic appendages, and the larva now begins to ingest food. After a further two protozoea stages, the larva hatches into the first mysis stage. This is typically 7 days after hatching, and the animal is typically around 2.2 mm (0.087 in) long. There are a further two mysis stages before the first post-larval stage, at a length of around 3.4 mm (0.13 in). In this stage, the pleopods (swimmerets; abdominal appendages) become functional, and the animal closely resembles the adult form.

Females live for 14–15 months, and reach sexual maturity at a carapace length of 15–17 mm (0.59–0.67 in). Males live for 13–14 months. In Korean waters, the adults migrate into shallower water in April.

== Fishery ==
Global capture production of Southern rough shrimp (Trachysalambria curvirostris) in thousand tonnes from 1968 to 2022, as reported by the FAO

A fishery for T. curvirostris was started in the mid 20th century, growing to over 300,000 t annually in the 21st century. It is a commercially important species in Korea, Japan, China and Taiwan, and is also fished on smaller scales in Madagascar, the Red Sea, the Gulf of Aden and the Arabian Sea. Although it is abundant around the coasts of Australia, T. curvirostris is too small to be commercially viable there. The fishery for T. curvirostris is carried out with otter trawls, gill nets and as an artisanal fishery. It is easier to catch at night, and is fished only in waters less than 60 m (200 ft) deep.

Worldwide, T. curvirostris is one of the five most important single species targeted by shrimp and prawn fisheries, with most of the harvest being landed in China. In Korea, T. curvirostris is the dominant species in the shrimp fishery, accounting for more than 50% of landings (other abundant prawn species in the area include Penaeus chinensis, Metapenaeus joyneri and Metapenaeopsis dalei).

== Taxonomy ==
The species was first described by William Stimpson in 1860, as a species in the genus Penaeus, with a type locality of Shimoda, Shizuoka, Japan. In 1901, Alcock erected a new genus Trachypeneus (later emended to Trachypenaeus after a petition to the International Commission on Zoological Nomenclature by Lipke Holthuis). In 1934, Martin Burkenroad introduced Trachysalambria as a subgenus of Trachypenaeus, assigning T. curvirostris as its type species. This subgenus was in turn elevated to the rank of genus in 1997, by Isabel Pérez Farfante and Brian Kensley.

Common names for the species include "cocktail shrimp", "hardback prawn", "southern rough prawn", and the name preferred by the Food and Agriculture Organization, "southern rough shrimp".
