= Metapenaeopsis andamanensis =

Scientific classification
- Kingdom: Animalia
- Phylum: Arthropoda
- Class: Malacostraca
- Order: Decapoda
- Suborder: Dendrobranchiata
- Family: Penaeidae
- Genus: Metapenaeopsis
- Species: M. andamanensis

Binomial name
- Metapenaeopsis andamanensis (Wood-Mason in Wood-Mason & Alcock, 1891)

Species of crustacean

Metapenaeopsis andamensis, commonly referred to as the rice velvet shrimp, is a species of prawn in the family Penaeidae. It lives in depths 150 to 350 m, and grows to 135 mm.
