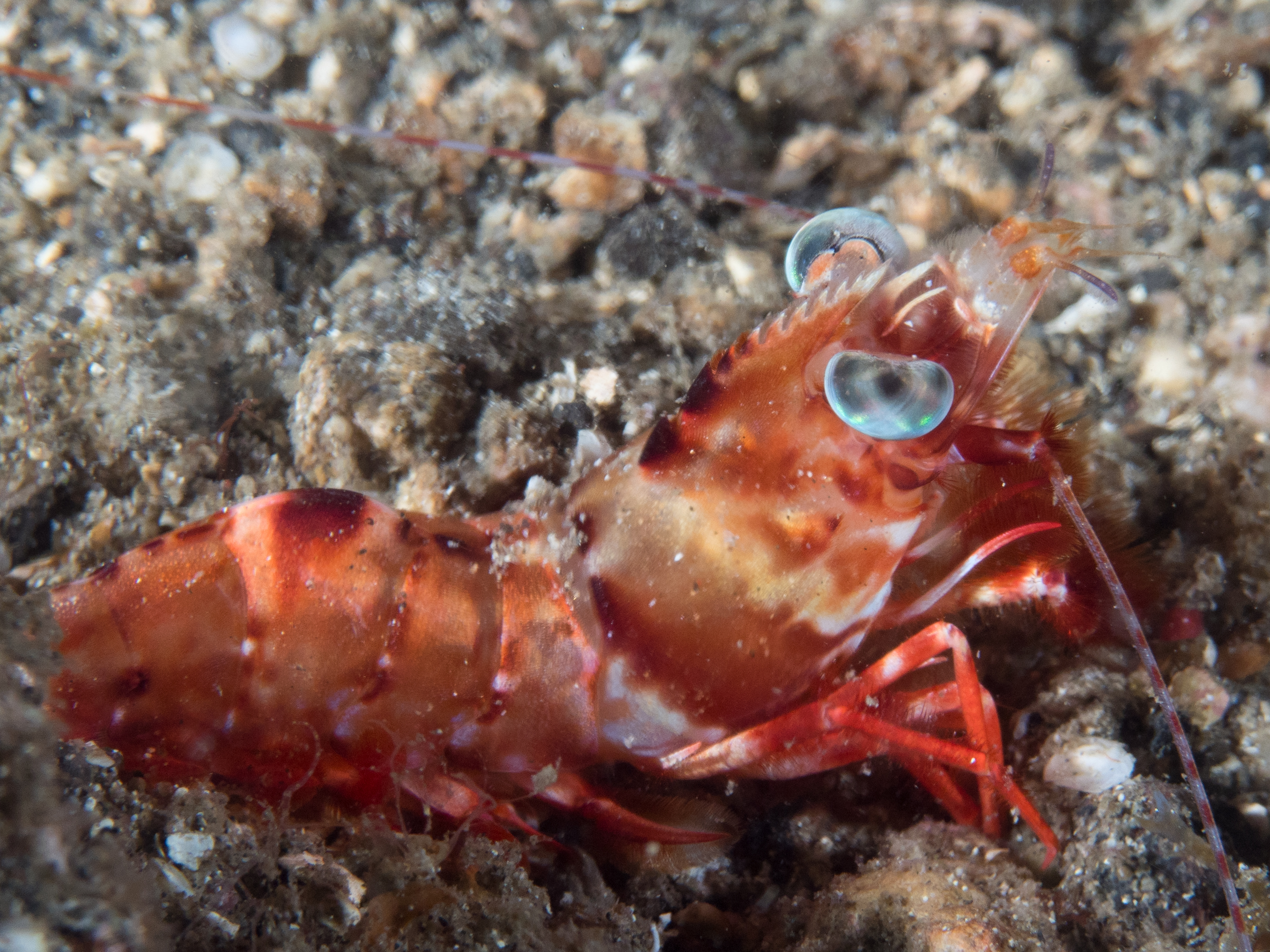

Scientific classification
- Kingdom: Animalia
- Phylum: Arthropoda
- Clade: Pancrustacea
- Class: Malacostraca
- Order: Decapoda
- Suborder: Dendrobranchiata
- Family: Penaeidae
- Genus: Metapenaeopsis
- Species: M. lamellata

Binomial name
- Metapenaeopsis lamellata (De Haan, 1844)

= Metapenaeopsis lamellata =

Species of crustacean

Metapenaeopsis lamellata, commonly known as the humpback prawn or humpback shrimp, is a species of prawn in the genus Metapenaeopsis. It grows up to 6.6 cm in length.

== Distribution ==
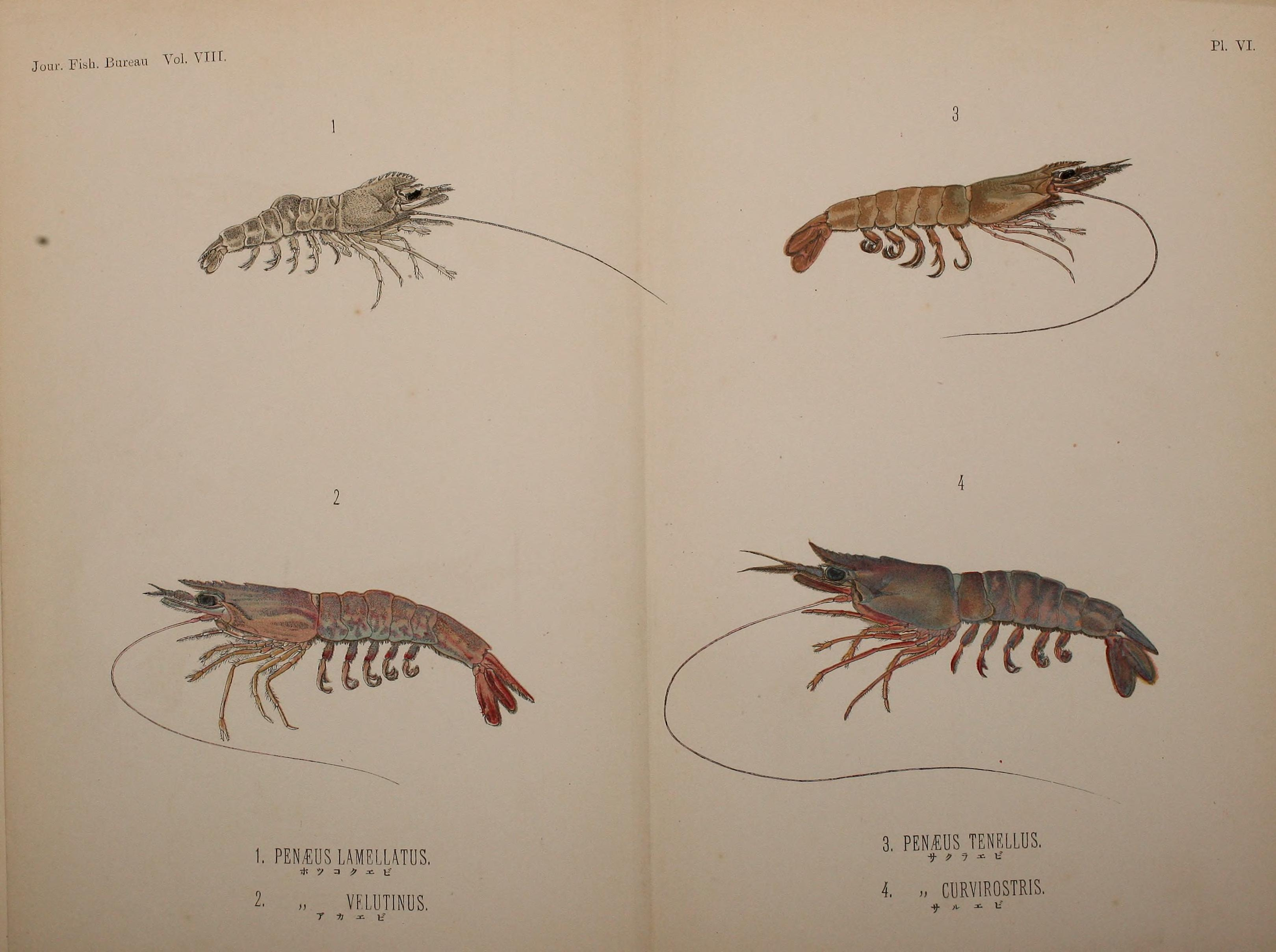
Fig. 1. Penaeus lamellatus now known as M. lamellata.

Metapenaeopsis lamellata is found in the Indo-West Pacific Ocean, from Japan through to Australia. It inhabits coral and sand at a depth of between 31 and 100 meters.

== Interest to fisheries ==
This species is commercially fished in Japan, and is listed among the important species in the fisheries. Not of great commercial value.
