= Metapenaeopsis acclivis =

Scientific classification
- Domain: Eukaryota
- Kingdom: Animalia
- Phylum: Arthropoda
- Class: Malacostraca
- Order: Decapoda
- Suborder: Dendrobranchiata
- Family: Penaeidae
- Genus: Metapenaeopsis
- Species: M. acclivis

Binomial name
- Metapenaeopsis acclivis (Rathbun, 1902)

Species of crustacean

Metapenaeopsis acclivis, commonly referred to as the Tora velvet shrimp, is a species of prawn in the family Penaeidae. It is Benthic, living between 9 – 46 m below the surface. It is found in the north-west Pacific, and grows up to 99 mm.
