= Trachysalambria palaestinensis =

Scientific classification
- Domain: Eukaryota
- Kingdom: Animalia
- Phylum: Arthropoda
- Class: Malacostraca
- Order: Decapoda
- Suborder: Dendrobranchiata
- Family: Penaeidae
- Genus: Trachysalambria
- Species: T. palaestinensis

Binomial name
- Trachysalambria palaestinensis (Steinitz, 1932)

Synonyms
- Metapenaeus palaestinensis Steinitz, 1932; Trachypenaeus palaestinensis Steinitz, 1932

Species of prawn

Trachysalambria palaestinensis is a species of prawn in the family Penaeidae which are distributed from the Bay of Haifa in northern Israel through the Suez Canal and into the Persian Gulf. They have been observed as far west in the Mediterranean Sea as Sicily.
