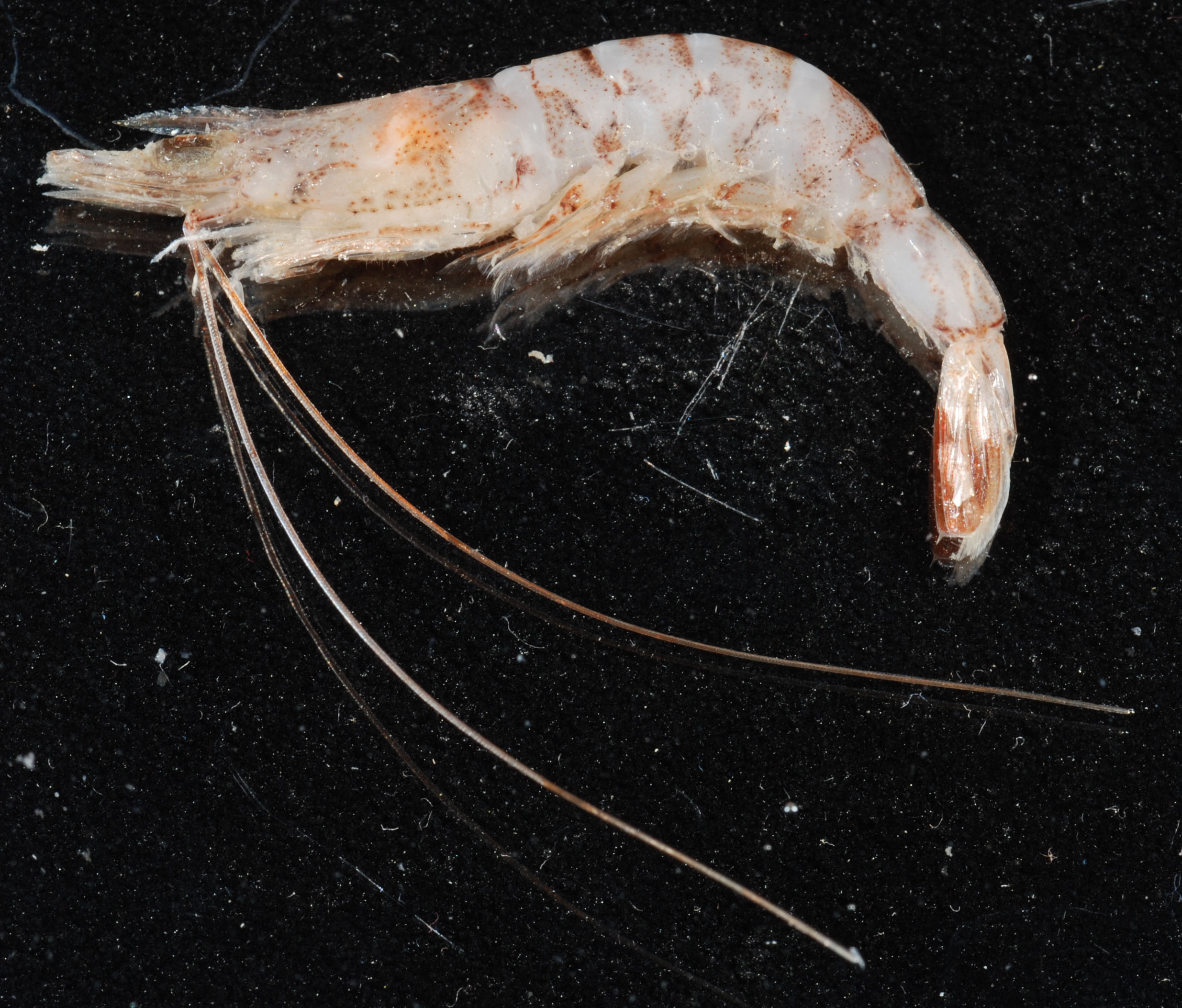
- Rimapenaeus constrictus, roughneck shrimp, 40 mm (1.6 in)

Scientific classification
- Domain: Eukaryota
- Kingdom: Animalia
- Phylum: Arthropoda
- Class: Malacostraca
- Order: Decapoda
- Suborder: Dendrobranchiata
- Family: Penaeidae
- Genus: Rimapenaeus
- Species: R. constrictus

Binomial name
- Rimapenaeus constrictus (Stimpson, 1871)

= Rimapenaeus constrictus =

Species of crustacean

Rimapenaeus constrictus, common name roughneck shrimp, is a species of prawn found along the coast of the Atlantic Ocean. It has been recorded in coastal regions of Bermuda, Brazil, Canada and the United States.
