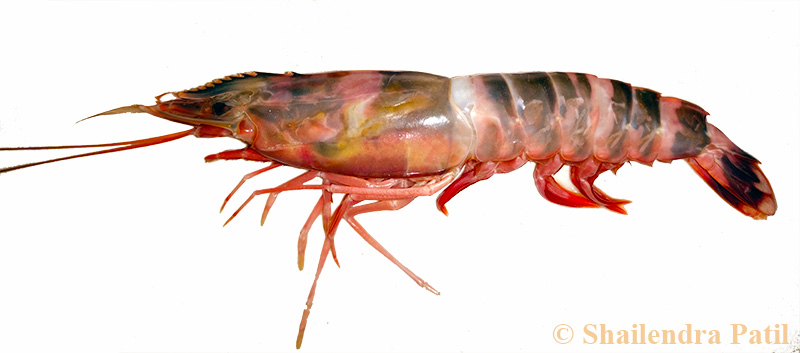

Scientific classification
- Kingdom: Animalia
- Phylum: Arthropoda
- Class: Malacostraca
- Order: Decapoda
- Family: Penaeidae
- Genus: Parapenaeopsis
- Species: P. sculptilis

Binomial name
- Parapenaeopsis sculptilis (Heller, 1862)

= Parapenaeopsis sculptilis =

Species of crustacean

Parapenaeopsis sculptilis, commonly known as the rainbow shrimp, is a marine crustacean that is widely reared for food.

== Distribution ==
Its natural distribution is the Indo-West Pacific.
