= Bombur =

Bombur may refer to:

- Bombur (crustacean), a genus of fossil prawns in the family Penaeidae
- Bombur (Middle-earth), a character in JRR Tolkien's novel The Hobbit
- Bombur, a dwarf in Norse mythology, named in Voluspo in the Elder Edda
