= Metapenaeopsis commensalis =

Scientific classification
- Domain: Eukaryota
- Kingdom: Animalia
- Phylum: Arthropoda
- Class: Malacostraca
- Order: Decapoda
- Suborder: Dendrobranchiata
- Family: Penaeidae
- Genus: Metapenaeopsis
- Species: M. commensalis

Binomial name
- Metapenaeopsis commensalis (Borrad., 1898)

Species of crustacean

Metapenaeopsis commensalis is a species of prawn in the family Penaeidae first described by Lancelot Alexander Borradaile in 1898.
