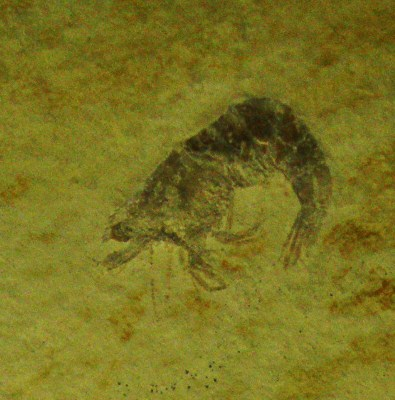
- Koelga muensteri

Scientific classification
- Domain: Eukaryota
- Kingdom: Animalia
- Phylum: Arthropoda
- Class: Malacostraca
- Order: Decapoda
- Suborder: Dendrobranchiata
- Family: Penaeidae
- Genus: †Koelga; Münster, 1839

Species
- Koelga curvirostris Münster, 1839; Koelga muensteri Schweigert & Garassino, 2004

= Koelga =

Koelga Temporal range: Tithonian

Extinct genus of crustaceans

Koelga is an extinct genus of prawn in the order Decapoda. It contains the species Koelga curvirostris and Koelga muensteri.
