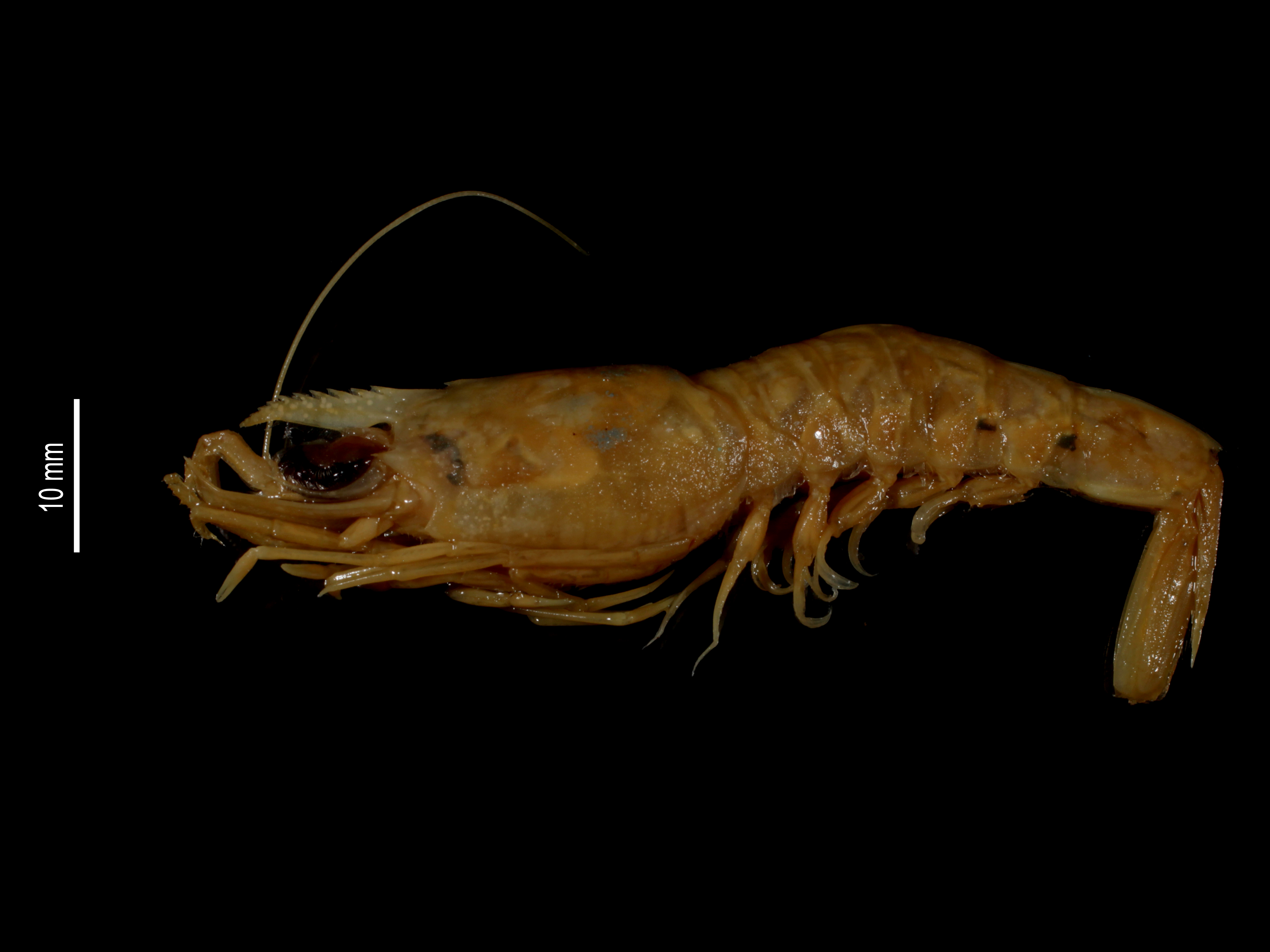

Scientific classification
- Domain: Eukaryota
- Kingdom: Animalia
- Phylum: Arthropoda
- Class: Malacostraca
- Order: Decapoda
- Suborder: Dendrobranchiata
- Family: Penaeidae
- Genus: Metapenaeopsis
- Species: M. mogiensis

Binomial name
- Metapenaeopsis mogiensis (M.J. Rathbun, 1902)

= Metapenaeopsis mogiensis =

Species of crustacean

Metapenaeopsis mogiensis, commonly known as the Mogi velvet shrimp, is a species of prawn in the family Penaeidae. It can grow up to 9 cm in length.

== Distribution ==
M. mogiensis is found in the Indo-west Pacific, in the Red Sea through to Japan. It tends to live between 11 and 30 meters below the surface.

== Interest to fisheries ==
Minor, though this species has been listed among commercially important shrimp in India.
