= Metapenaeopsis kishinouyei =

Scientific classification
- Domain: Eukaryota
- Kingdom: Animalia
- Phylum: Arthropoda
- Class: Malacostraca
- Order: Decapoda
- Suborder: Dendrobranchiata
- Family: Penaeidae
- Genus: Metapenaeopsis
- Species: M. kishinouyei

Binomial name
- Metapenaeopsis kishinouyei (Rathbun, 1902)

Species of crustacean

Metapenaeopsis kishinouyei is a species of prawn in the genus Metapenaeopsis, the velvet shrimps. The specific epithet is a tribute to the Japanese fisheries biologist Kamakichi Kishinouye (岸上 鎌吉, 1867–1929).
