= Aquaculture in Solomon Islands =

Aquaculture in Solomon Islands became an important activity in 1983 when an Australian farmer established a private prawn farm in western Guadalcanal, approximately 25 km from Honiara. Still, aquaculture has not proven to be a commercially viable option for the Solomon Islands.
