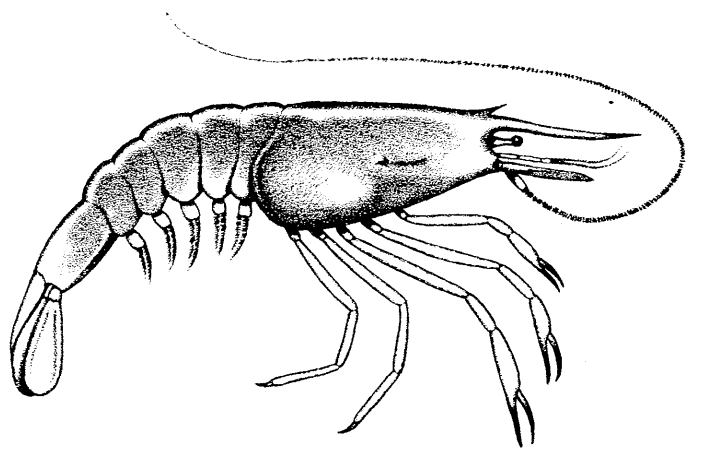
- Life reconstruction of A. karojoi

Scientific classification
- Kingdom: Animalia
- Phylum: Arthropoda
- Clade: Pancrustacea
- Class: Malacostraca
- Order: Decapoda
- Suborder: Dendrobranchiata
- Family: Penaeidae
- Genus: †Ambilobeia; Garassino & Pasini, 2002
- Species: †A. karojoi

Binomial name
- †Ambilobeia karojoi Garassino & Pasini, 2002

= Ambilobeia =

Ambilobeia Temporal range: Olenekian

Extinct genus of crustaceans

Ambilobeia is an extinct genus of prawn from the Isalo II Formation in Ambilobé, Madagascar during the Olenekian stage of the Early Triassic period. It contains the species Ambilobeia karojoi.

== Discovery and naming ==
The holotype, MSNM 125459, was discovered by an unknown French palaeontologist in a deforested outcrop in the Isalo II Formation near Bobasatrana, Madagascar during 1990s and was donated to the Museo Civico di Storia Naturale di Milano before 2002 by Mr. Karojo, a local Malagasy prospector. The majority of specimens described by Garassino & Pasini (2002) were collected during the 1980s and 1990s following local Malagasy surveys of decapod fossils.

The species Ambilobeia karojoi was named and described in 2002 by Alessandro Garassino and Giovanni Pasini, and many other specimens have been discovered since its naming in 2002.

== Description ==
Ambilobeia is one of the earliest known prawn species that existed in the Southern Hemisphere after the Permian–Triassic extinction event, and it grew up to roughly 8 centimetres (3.1 in) long.

Morphologically, Ambilobeia is characterized and differentiated from Ifasya by a slender carapace, an elongate rostrum without supra- or subrostral teeth, and the first three pereiopods bearing short, thin chelae.

== Gallery ==
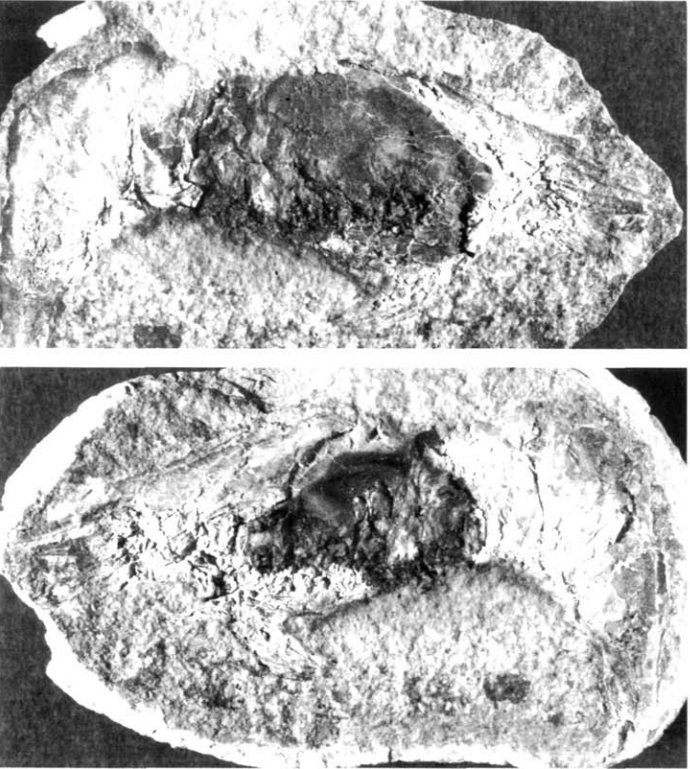
Holotype of A. karojoi (MSNM 125459), Isalo II Formation, Bobasatrana, Madagascar

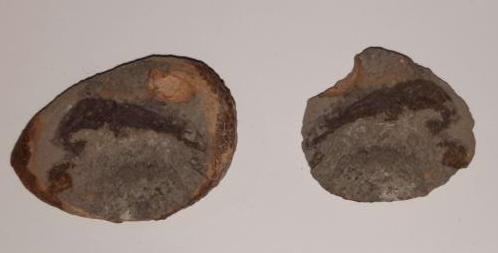
Specimen of cf. Ambilobeia from Madagascar
