= Metapenaeopsis miersi =

Scientific classification
- Domain: Eukaryota
- Kingdom: Animalia
- Phylum: Arthropoda
- Class: Malacostraca
- Order: Decapoda
- Suborder: Dendrobranchiata
- Family: Penaeidae
- Genus: Metapenaeopsis
- Species: M. miersi

Binomial name
- Metapenaeopsis miersi (Holthuis, 1952)

Crustacean species

Metapenaeopsis miersi is a crustacean species in the family Penaeidae described by Lipke Bijdeley Holthuis in 1952.
