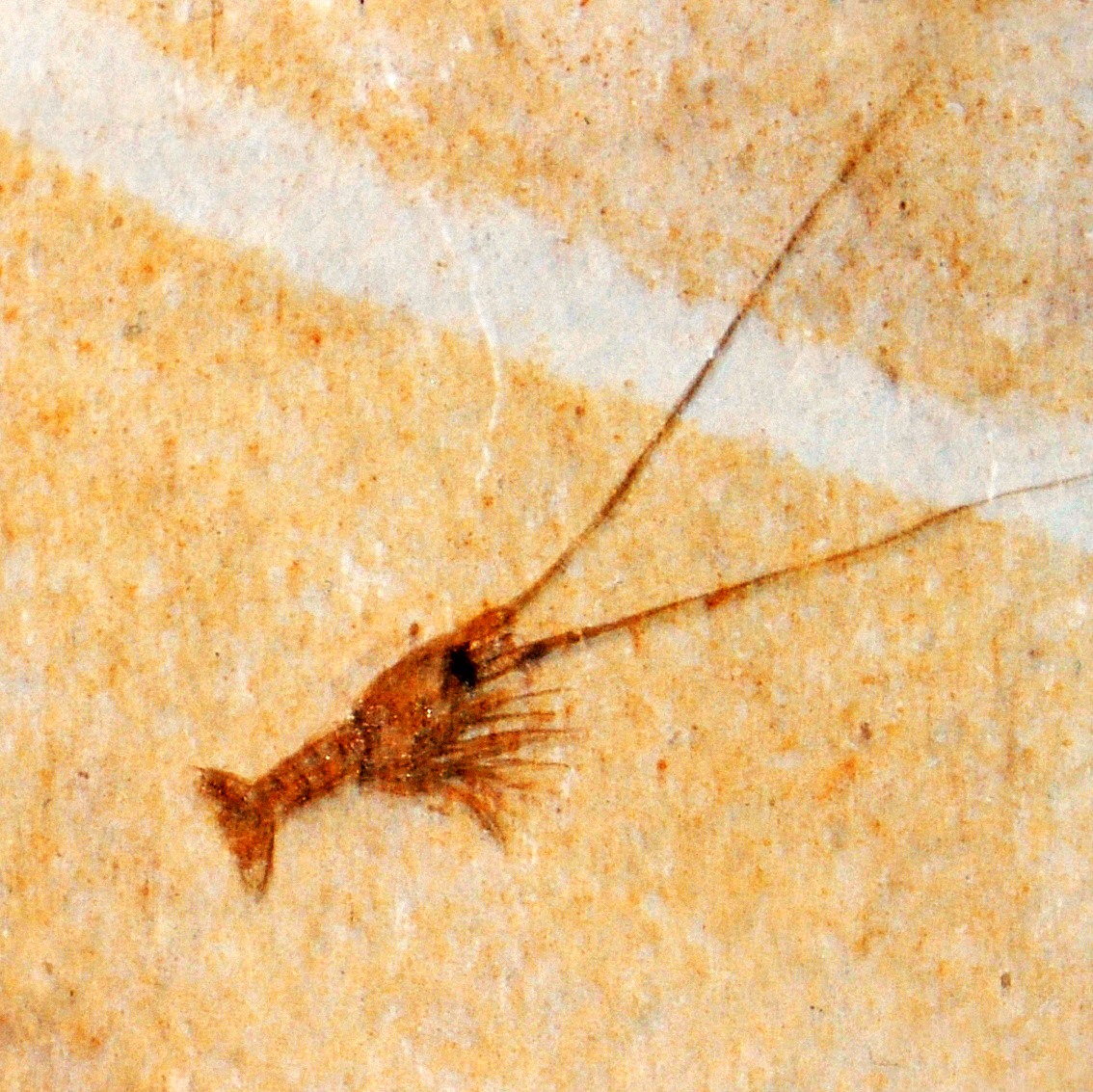
- Fossil of Palinurina species, Jurassic of Solnhofen, Germany

Scientific classification
- Kingdom: Animalia
- Phylum: Arthropoda
- Class: Malacostraca
- Order: Decapoda
- Suborder: Pleocyemata
- Family: Palinuridae
- Genus: †Palinurina; Munster, 1839

= Palinurina =

Palinurina Temporal range: Jurassic

Extinct genus of crustaceans

Palinurina is an extinct genus of crustaceans, belonging to the decapods. These animals lived between the Lower Jurassic and the Upper Jurassic (about 195 - 150 million years ago) and their fossils can be found in Europe (England and Germany). This crustacean is considered one of the oldest lobsters.

== Species ==
Species within this genus include:

- Palinurina longipes Munster 1839
- Palinurina tenera Oppel 1862

== Description ==
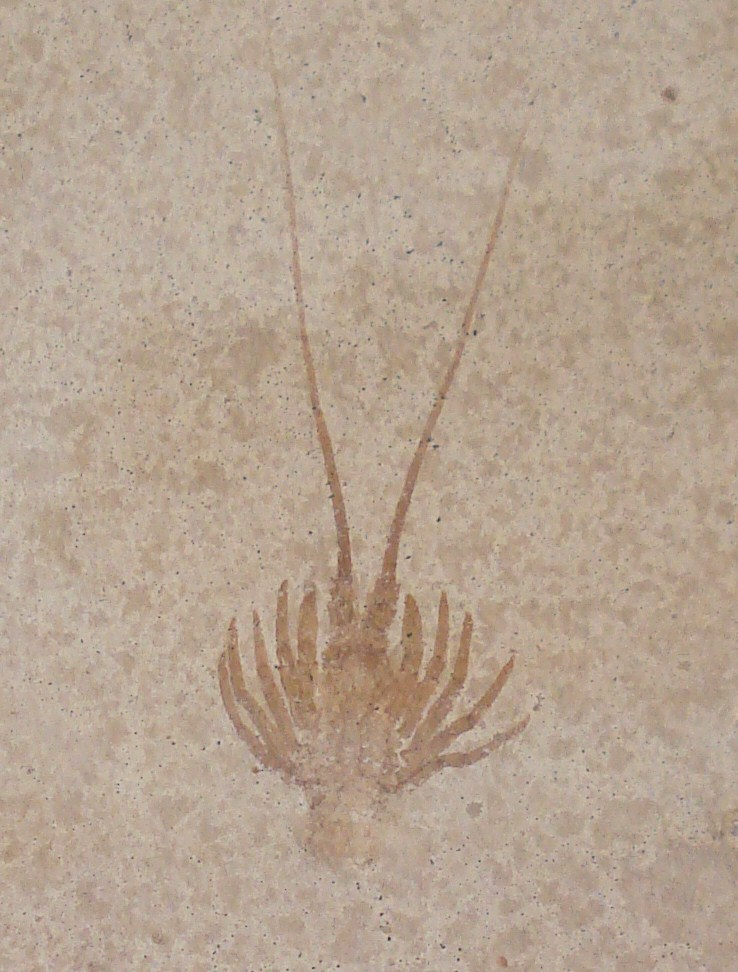
Fossil of Palinurina longipes

These species was rather small compared to the current lobsters, and the side generally did not exceed 5 centimeters in length (without antennae).

The appearance was however very similar to today's forms, with a more or less rectangular carapace, an exoskeleton covered with small tubercles, very elongated antennae and five pairs of elongated and strong legs.

Both the species have been found in the Solnhofen field in Bavaria. They can be distinguished by some antenna characteristics: Palinurina tenera had antennas segmented with smooth margin, while in Palinutina longipes margin was notched.

Palinurina is very similar to another archaic lobster, Archaeopalinurus, originating from the Italian upper Triassic.

Between the two genera, however, there were some morphological differences, mainly with regard to the shape and ornamentation of the caudal fan, to the length of the legs and antennae.

== Bibliography ==
- Georg zu Münster (1839). Decapoda Macroura. Abbildung und Beschreibung der fossilen langschwänzigen Krebse in den Kalkschiefern von Baiern. Beiträge zur Petrefacten-Kunde. 2. Bayreuth, Germany. pp. 43–45.
- Forste r R., 1973 - Untersuchungen an oberjurassischen Palinuridae (Crustacea, Decapoda). Mitt. Bayer. Staatssamml. Palaont. hist. Geol., 13: 31–46, Monaco di Baviera.
- Alessandro Garassino & Günter Schweigert (2006). "The Upper Jurassic Solnhofen decapod crustacean fauna: review of the types from old descriptions. Part I. Infraorders Astacidea, Thalassinidea, and Palinura". Memorie della Società Italiana di Scienze Naturali e del Museo Civico di Storia Naturale di Milano 34.
