= Paracancrinos =

Paracancrinos Temporal range: Cenomanian

Scientific classification
- Kingdom: Animalia
- Phylum: Arthropoda
- Class: Malacostraca
- Order: Decapoda
- Suborder: Pleocyemata
- Family: †Cancrinidae
- Genus: †Paracancrinos; Haug et al., 2016
- Species: †P. libanensis

Binomial name
- †Paracancrinos libanensis (Garassino & Schweigert, 2006)

Synonyms
- Cancrinos libanensis Garassino & Schweigert, 2006

Extinct genus of crustaceans

Paracancrinos is a prehistoric genus of crustacean that lived during the Upper Cretaceous in what is now Lebanon. It contains a single species, P. libanensis, which was originally described as a species of Cancrinos in 2006, but was moved to its own genus in 2016.
