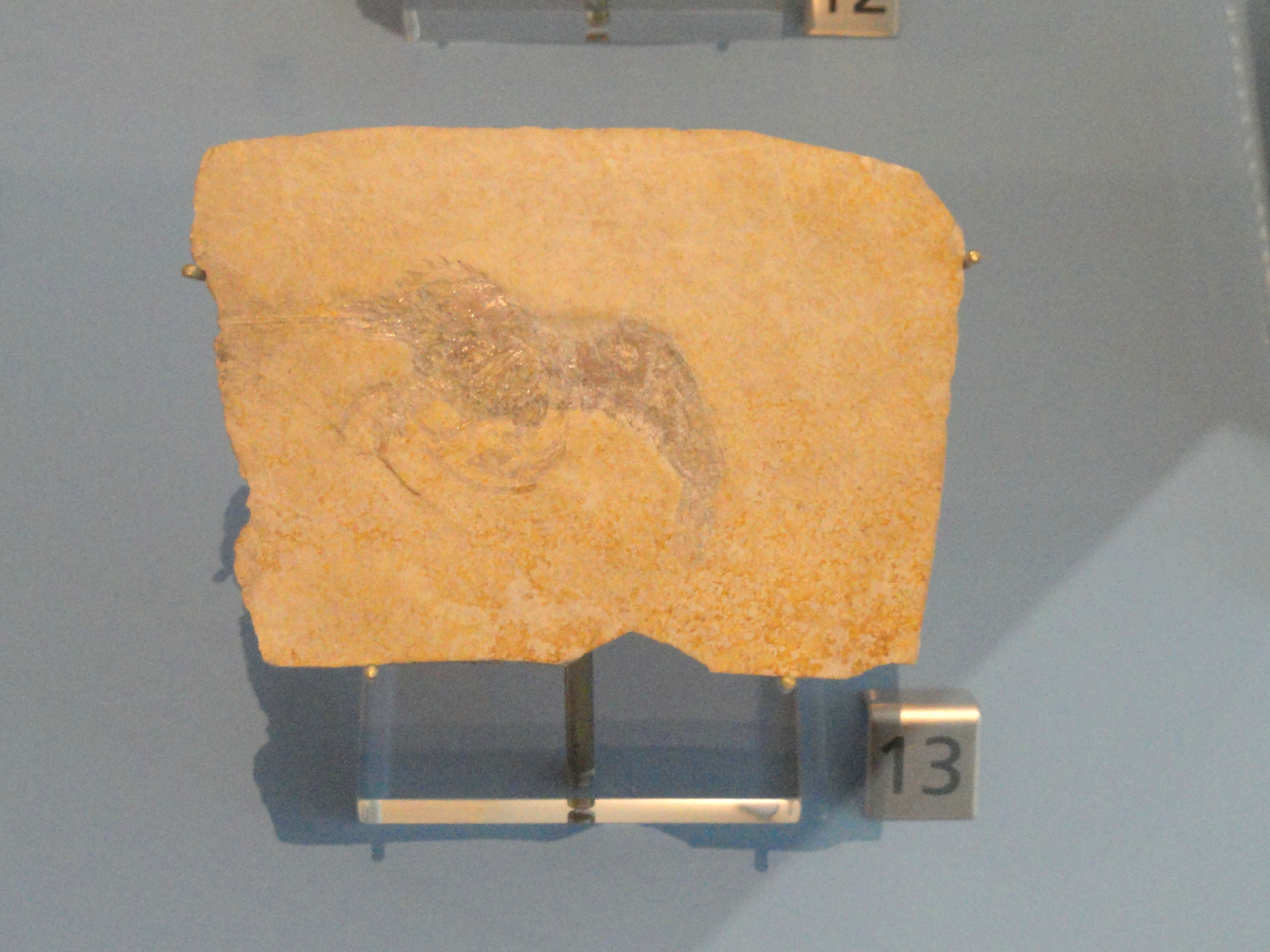

Scientific classification
- Kingdom: Animalia
- Phylum: Arthropoda
- Class: Malacostraca
- Order: Decapoda
- Suborder: Dendrobranchiata
- Family: Penaeidae
- Genus: †Drobna
- Species: †D. deformis

Binomial name
- †Drobna deformis Münster, 1839

= Drobna =

Drobna Temporal range: Late Jurassic

Extinct genus of crustaceans

Drobna deformis is an extinct species of prawn, the only species in the genus Drobna.
