= Longitergite =

Longitergite Temporal range: Lower Miocene

Scientific classification
- Kingdom: Animalia
- Phylum: Arthropoda
- Class: Malacostraca
- Order: Decapoda
- Suborder: Dendrobranchiata
- Family: Penaeidae
- Genus: †Longitergite; Garassino & Teruzzi, 1996

Extinct genus of crustaceans

Longitergite is an extinct genus of prawn which existed in Russia during the Lower Miocene period. It contains a single species, Longitergite miocenicus.
