= Heteropenaeus =

Scientific classification
- Domain: Eukaryota
- Kingdom: Animalia
- Phylum: Arthropoda
- Class: Malacostraca
- Order: Decapoda
- Suborder: Dendrobranchiata
- Family: Penaeidae
- Genus: Heteropenaeus de Man, 1896
- Species: H. longimanus

Binomial name
- Heteropenaeus longimanus de Man, 1896

Genus of crustaceans

Heteropenaeus is a monotypic genus of shrimps belonging to the family Penaeidae. Its only species is Heteropenaeus longimanus, known by the common name longarm prawn.

The longarm prawn is widespread throughout the tropical waters of the central Indo-Pacific region, from Indonesia to Philippines and from south Japan to New-Caledonia.
