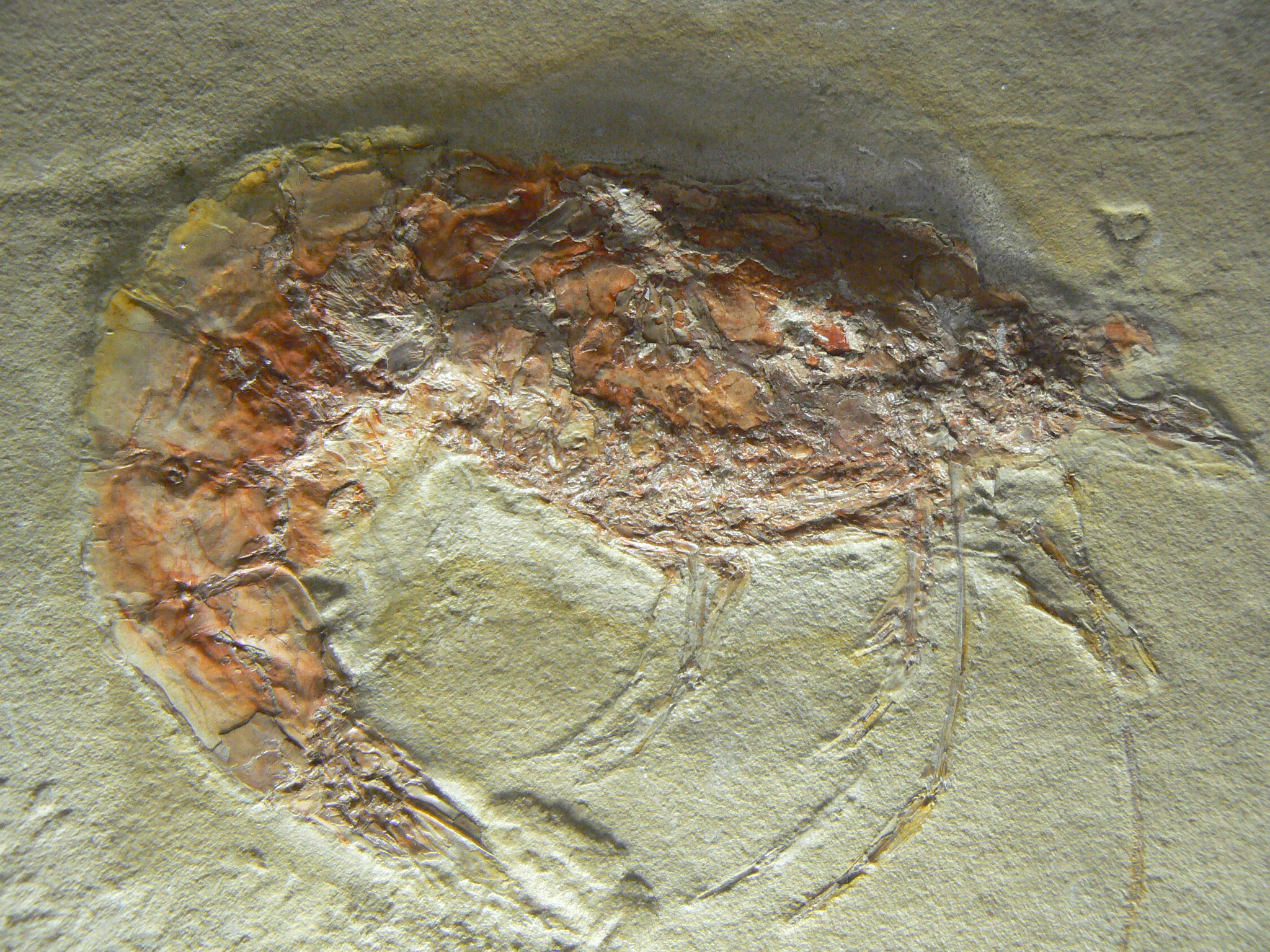
- Antrimpos speciosus

Scientific classification
- Domain: Eukaryota
- Kingdom: Animalia
- Phylum: Arthropoda
- Class: Malacostraca
- Order: Decapoda
- Suborder: Dendrobranchiata
- Family: Penaeidae
- Genus: Antrimpos; Münster, 1835

= Antrimpos =

Antrimpos Temporal range: Triassic–Jurassic

Extinct genus of crustaceans

Antrimpos is an extinct genus of crustacean which existed during the Triassic and Jurassic periods. It contains 15 species, including Antrimpos speciosus.
