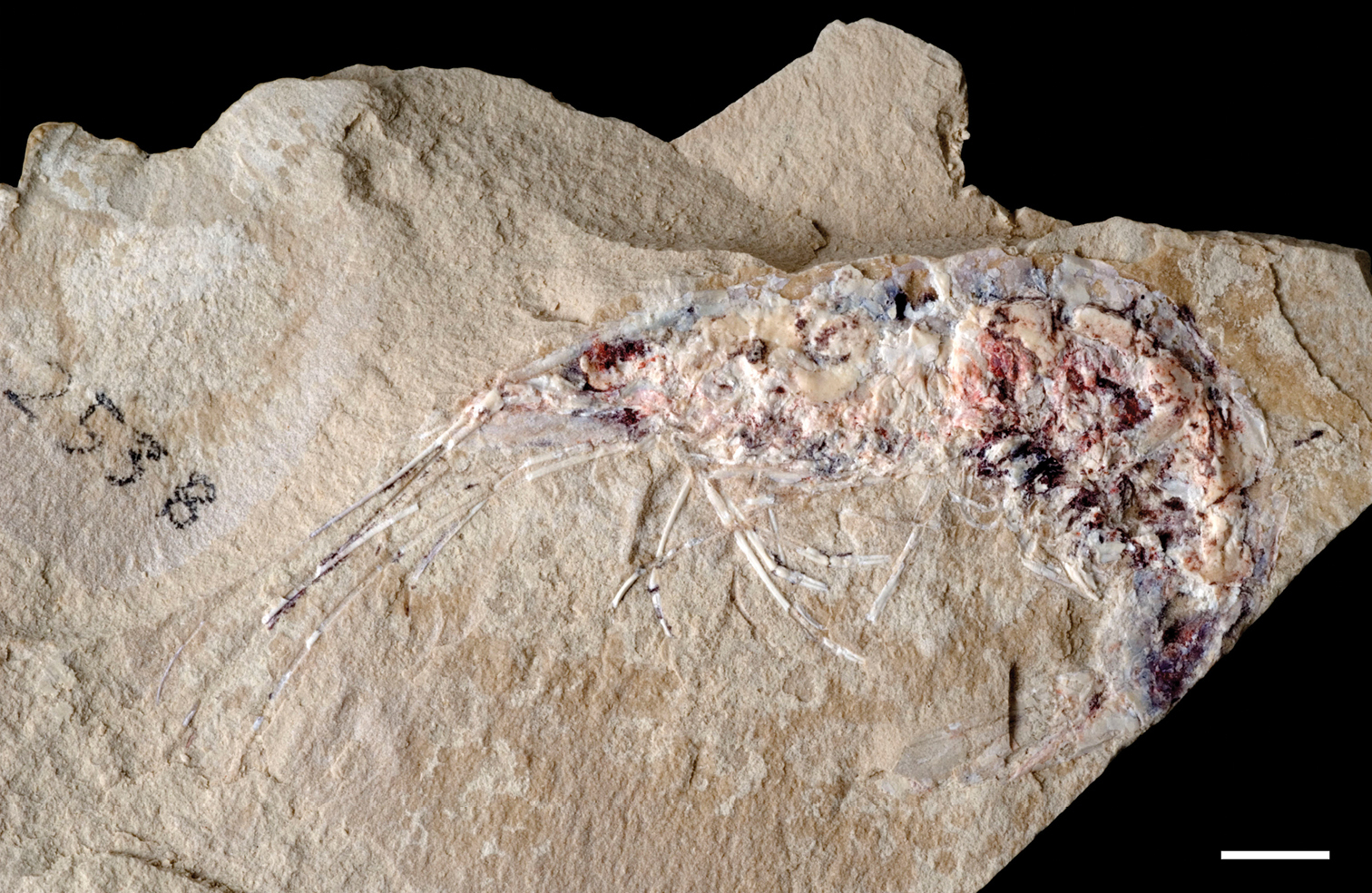
- Fossil from Oum Tkout, Douira Formation

Scientific classification
- Kingdom: Animalia
- Phylum: Arthropoda
- Class: Malacostraca
- Order: Decapoda
- Suborder: Dendrobranchiata
- Family: Penaeidae
- Genus: †Cretapenaeus; Garassino, Pasini & Dutheil, 2006
- Species: †C. berberus

Binomial name
- †Cretapenaeus berberus Garassino, Pasini & Dutheil, 2006

= Cretapenaeus =

Cretapenaeus Temporal range: Late Cretaceous

Extinct genus of crustaceans

Cretapenaeus berberus is an extinct species of prawn which existed in Morocco during the Late Cretaceous period. It is the only species in the genus Cretapenaeus.
