= Metapenaeopsis dalei =

Scientific classification
- Domain: Eukaryota
- Kingdom: Animalia
- Phylum: Arthropoda
- Class: Malacostraca
- Order: Decapoda
- Suborder: Dendrobranchiata
- Family: Penaeidae
- Genus: Metapenaeopsis
- Species: M. dalei

Binomial name
- Metapenaeopsis dalei (M.J. Rathbun, 1902)

Species of shrimp

Metapenaeopsis dalei, commonly known as the Kishi velvet shrimp, is a species of prawn in the family Penaeidae. It is found in the Indo-west Pacific, around Japan, Korea, and North China, between the depths of 33 and 132 meters. M. dalei grows up to 7.6 cm in length.
