= Rauna angusta =

Rauna angusta Temporal range: Upper Jurassic

Scientific classification
- Kingdom: Animalia
- Phylum: Arthropoda
- Class: Malacostraca
- Order: Decapoda
- Suborder: Dendrobranchiata
- Family: Penaeidae
- Genus: †Rauna; Münster, 1839
- Species: †R. angusta

Binomial name
- †Rauna angusta Münster, 1839

Species of crustacean

Rauna is an extinct genus of prawn, containing the single species Rauna angusta, described from the Solnhofen limestones of southern Germany.
