= Pseudobombur =

Pseudobombur Temporal range: Eocene

Scientific classification
- Kingdom: Animalia
- Phylum: Arthropoda
- Class: Malacostraca
- Order: Decapoda
- Suborder: Dendrobranchiata
- Family: Penaeidae
- Genus: †Pseudobombur; Secretan, 1975
- Species: †P. nummuliticus

Binomial name
- †Pseudobombur nummuliticus Secretan, 1975

Extinct genus of crustaceans

Pseudobombur is an extinct genus of crustacean in the order Decapoda, containing the species Pseudobombur nummuliticus.
