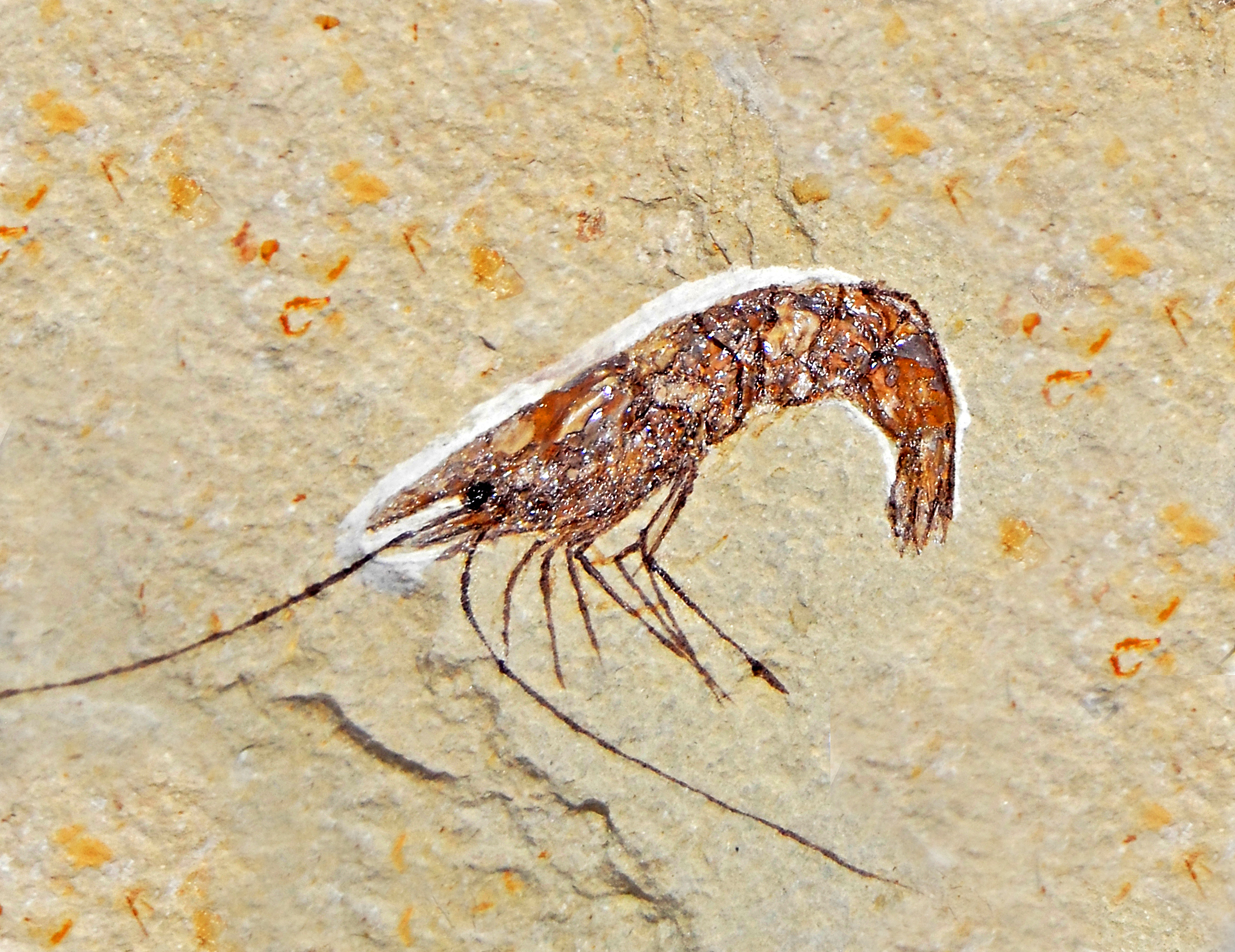
- Macropenaeus incertus from Lebanon

Scientific classification
- Kingdom: Animalia
- Phylum: Arthropoda
- Class: Malacostraca
- Order: Decapoda
- Suborder: Dendrobranchiata
- Family: Penaeidae
- Genus: Macropenaeus; Garassino, 1994
- Species: M. incertus

Binomial name
- Macropenaeus incertus (Roger, 1946)

Synonyms
- Penaeus incertus Roger, 1946

= Macropenaeus =

Macropenaeus Temporal range: Barremian–Cenomanian

Extinct genus of crustaceans

Macropenaeus is an extinct genus of prawn in the order Decapoda, containing two species: the type species M. incertus, known from the Late Cretaceous (Cenomanian) of Lebanon, and M. sidiaichensis known from the Early Cretaceous (Barremian) of Tunisia.

The tail, segmented carapace, and long legs are clearly defined. The long, slender antennae are nicely displayed. The fossil dendrobranchiate shrimp Macropenaeus was originally described from the Upper Cretaceous (Cenomanian) limestones of Hadjoula, northwest Lebanon. A new species, M. sidiaichensis sp. nov., was recovered from the Sidi Aïch Formation in the Northern Chotts Range, southern Tunisia. The Barremian occurrence of the genus in Tunisia suggests that Macropenaeus most likely originated in northern Africa and then migrated to Arabia in the Cenomanian. The association of the fossil shrimp with conchostracans, plant fragments, and fish indicates the interaction of freshwater and marine conditions that characterized the northern African margin as part of widespread coastal complex, paralic environments during the Barremian.
