= Satyrocaris =

Satyrocaris Temporal range: Upper Triassic

Scientific classification
- Kingdom: Animalia
- Phylum: Arthropoda
- Class: Malacostraca
- Order: Decapoda
- Suborder: Dendrobranchiata
- Family: Penaeidae
- Genus: †Satyrocaris; Garassino & Teruzzi, 1993

Extinct genus of crustaceans

Satyrocaris is an extinct genus of prawn in the family Penaeidae that existed during the Triassic in what is now Italy. It was described by Garassino and Teruzzi in 1993, and the type species is Satyrocaris cristatus.
