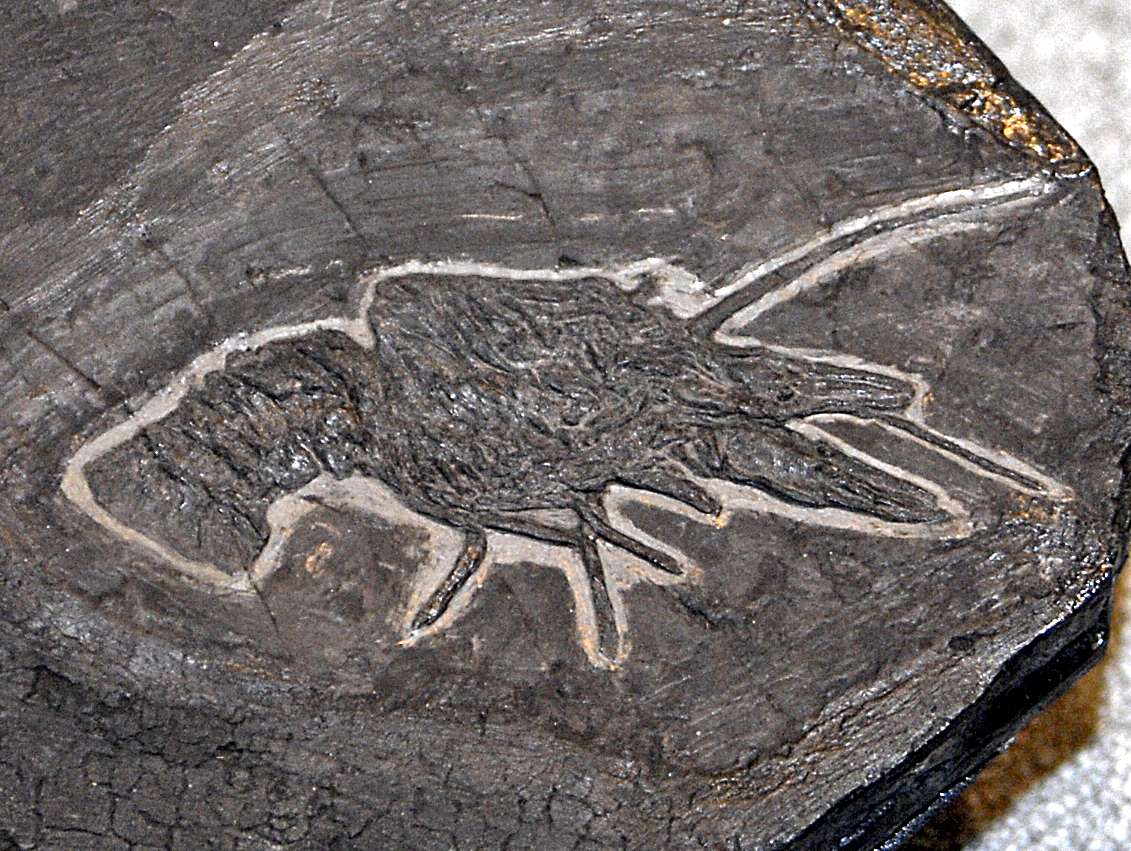
- Longichela from Berbenno (Italy)

Scientific classification
- Kingdom: Animalia
- Phylum: Arthropoda
- Class: Malacostraca
- Order: Decapoda
- Suborder: Dendrobranchiata
- Family: Penaeidae
- Genus: †Longichela; Garassino & Teruzzi, 1993
- Species: †L. orobica

Binomial name
- †Longichela orobica Garassino & Teruzzi, 1993

= Longichela =

Longichela Temporal range: 205.6–201.6 Ma Norian

Extinct genus of crustaceans

Longichela orobica is an extinct species of prawn which lived in the Norian, and is the only species in the genus Longichela.

== Distribution ==
Fossils of this species were found only in the Triassic marine strata of Lombardy (Northern Italy).
