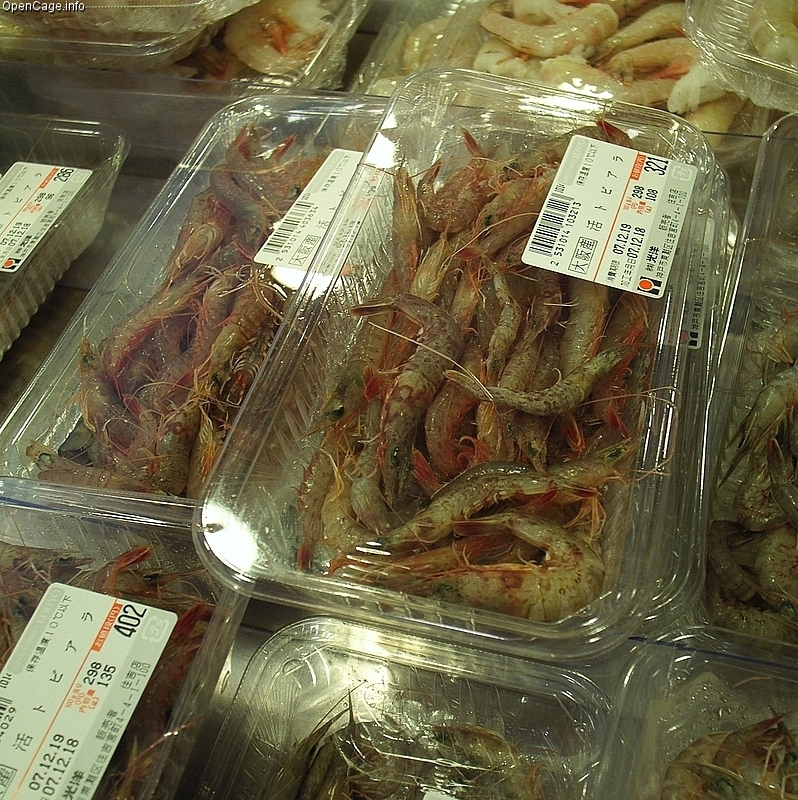
- Trachysalambria curvirostris

Scientific classification
- Domain: Eukaryota
- Kingdom: Animalia
- Phylum: Arthropoda
- Class: Malacostraca
- Order: Decapoda
- Suborder: Dendrobranchiata
- Family: Penaeidae
- Genus: Trachysalambria; Burkenroad, 1934

Type species
- Trachysalambria curvirostris (Stimpson, 1860)

= Trachysalambria =

Genus of crustaceans

Trachysalambria is a genus of prawns. It was erected in 1934 by Martin Burkenroad, as a subgenus of Trachypenaeus, with T. curvirostris as its type species. That subgenus was elevated to the rank of genus in 1997 by Isabel Pérez Farfante and Brian Kensley. It contains the following species:

- Trachysalambria albicoma (Hayashi & Toriyama, 1980)
- Trachysalambria aspera (Alcock, 1905)
- Trachysalambria brevisuturae (Burkenroad, 1934)
- Trachysalambria crosnieri Chan, Cleva & Chu, 2016
- Trachysalambria curvirostris (Stimpson, 1860)
- Trachysalambria dentata Chan, Cleva & Chu, 2016
- Trachysalambria longipes (Paul'son, 1875)
- Trachysalambria malaiana (Balss, 1933)
- Trachysalambria nansei Sakaji & Hayashi, 2003
- Trachysalambria palaestinensis (Steinitz, 1932)
- Trachysalambria parvispina Chan, Cleva & Chu, 2016
- Trachysalambria starobogatovi (Ivanov & Hassan, 1976)
