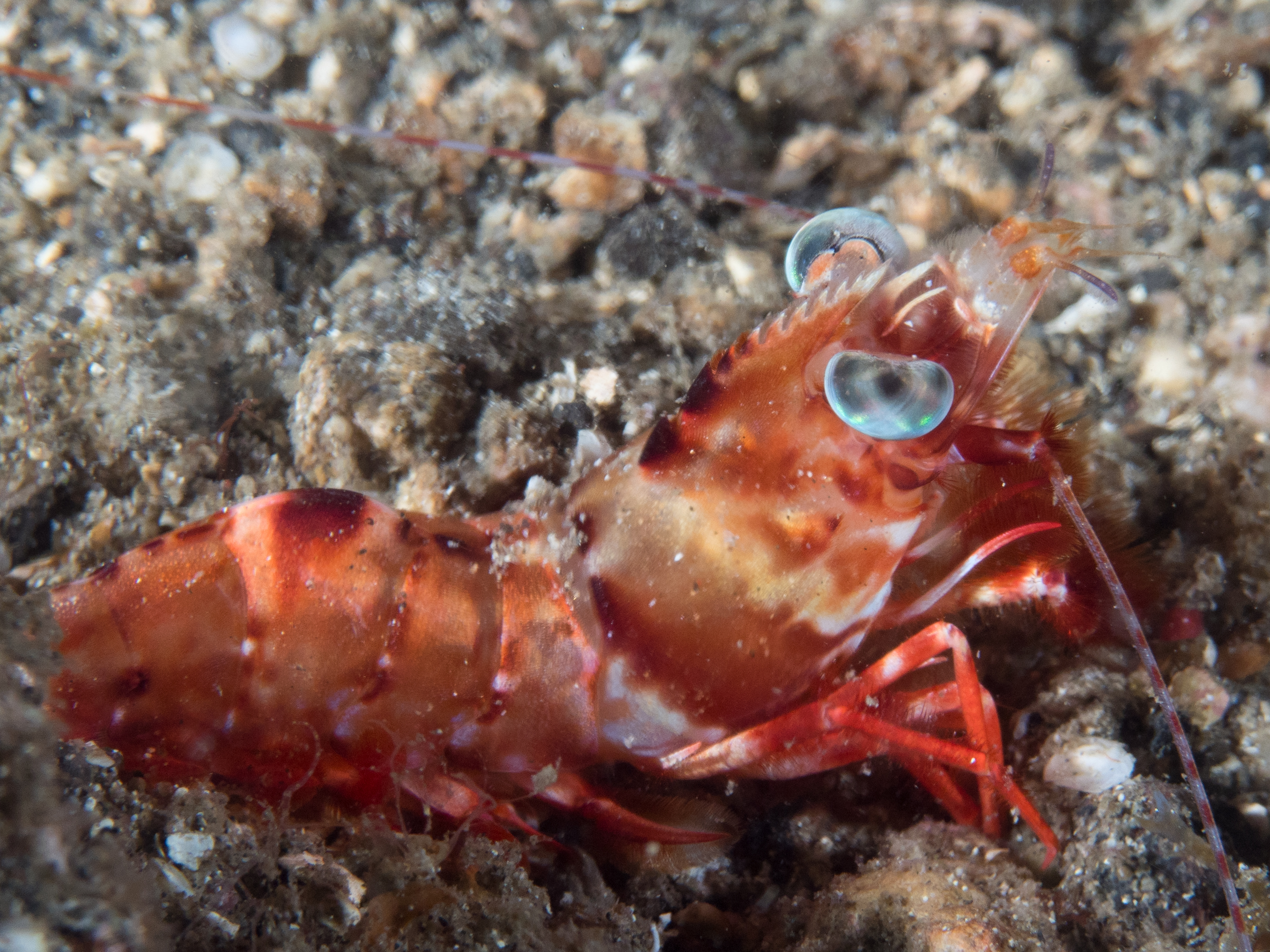
- Metapenaeopsis lamellata

Scientific classification
- Kingdom: Animalia
- Phylum: Arthropoda
- Clade: Pancrustacea
- Class: Malacostraca
- Order: Decapoda
- Suborder: Dendrobranchiata
- Family: Penaeidae
- Genus: Metapenaeopsis; Bouvier, 1905

Type species
- Metapenaeopsis pubescens Bouvier, 1905

= Metapenaeopsis =

Genus of crustaceans

Metapenaeopsis, the velvet shrimps, is a prawn genus in the family Penaeidae. It contains the following species:

- Metapenaeopsis acclivis (Rathbun, 1902)
- Metapenaeopsis aegyptia Galil & Golani, 1990
- Metapenaeopsis andamanensis (Wood-Mason in Wood-Mason & Alcock, 1891)
- Metapenaeopsis angusta Crosnier, 1987
- Metapenaeopsis assimilis (De Man, 1920)
- Metapenaeopsis barbata (De Haan, 1844)
- Metapenaeopsis batei (Miers, 1884a)
- Metapenaeopsis beebei (Burkenroad, 1938)
- Metapenaeopsis ceylonica Starobogatov, 1972
- Metapenaeopsis commensalis Borradaile, 1899
- Metapenaeopsis coniger (Wood-Mason in Wood-Mason & Alcock, 1891)
- Metapenaeopsis costata Crosnier, 1991
- Metapenaeopsis crassissima Racek & Dall, 1965
- Metapenaeopsis dalei (Rathbun, 1902)
- Metapenaeopsis difficilis Crosnier, 1991
- Metapenaeopsis distincta (De Man, 1907)
- Metapenaeopsis dura Kubo, 1949
- Metapenaeopsis aegyptia Galil & Golani, 1990
- Metapenaeopsis erythraea Crosnier, 1987
- Metapenaeopsis evermanni (Rathbun, 1906)
- Metapenaeopsis faouzii (Ramadan, 1938)
- Metapenaeopsis fusca Manning, R.J.G., 1988
- Metapenaeopsis gaillardi Crosnier, 1991
- Metapenaeopsis gallensis (Pearson, 1905)
- Metapenaeopsis gerardoi Pérez Farfante, 1971
- Metapenaeopsis goodei (Smith, 1885b)
- Metapenaeopsis hilarula (De Man, 1911)
- Metapenaeopsis hobbsi Pérez Farfante, 1971
- Metapenaeopsis incisa Crosnier, 1991
- Metapenaeopsis ivanovi Crosnier, 1994
- Metapenaeopsis kishinouyei (Rathbun, 1902)
- Metapenaeopsis kuboi Ivanov & Hassan, 1976
- Metapenaeopsis kyushuensis (Yokoya, 1933)
- Metapenaeopsis lamellata (De Haan, 1844)
- Metapenaeopsis lata Kubo, 1949
- Metapenaeopsis laubieri Crosnier, 1991
- Metapenaeopsis lindae R. J. G. Manning, 1988
- Metapenaeopsis liui Crosnier, 1987
- Metapenaeopsis mannarensis De Bruin, 1965
- Metapenaeopsis manningi Crosnier, 1994
- Metapenaeopsis marquesas Crosnier, 1991
- Metapenaeopsis martinella Pérez Farfante, 1971
- Metapenaeopsis menoui Crosnier, 1991
- Metapenaeopsis miersi (Holthuis, 1952)
- Metapenaeopsis mineri Burkenroad, 1934
- Metapenaeopsis mogiensis Rathbun, 1902
- Metapenaeopsis novaeguineae (Haswell, 1879)
- Metapenaeopsis palmensis (Haswell, 1879)
- Metapenaeopsis parahilarula Crosnier, 1991
- Metapenaeopsis parapalmensis Crosnier, 1994
- Metapenaeopsis perlarum Nobili, 1905
- Metapenaeopsis persica Crosnier, 1991
- Metapenaeopsis philippii (Bate, 1881)
- Metapenaeopsis propinqua Crosnier, 1991
- Metapenaeopsis provocatoria Racek & Dall, 1965
- Metapenaeopsis proxima Crosnier, 1991
- Metapenaeopsis quadrilobata Crosnier, 1991
- Metapenaeopsis quinquedentata (De Man, 1907)
- Metapenaeopsis richeri Crosnier, 1991
- Metapenaeopsis rosea Racek & Dall, 1965
- Metapenaeopsis scotti Champion, 1973
- Metapenaeopsis sibogae (De Man, 1907)
- Metapenaeopsis sinica Liu & Zhong in R. Liu & Zhong, 1983
- Metapenaeopsis sinuosa Dall, 1957
- Metapenaeopsis smithi (Schmitt, 1924)
- Metapenaeopsis spatulata Crosnier, 1991
- Metapenaeopsis spiridonovi Crosnier, 1991
- Metapenaeopsis stokmani Burukovsky, 1990
- Metapenaeopsis stridulans (Alcock, 1905)
- Metapenaeopsis tarawensis Racek & Dall, 1965
- Metapenaeopsis tchekunovae Starobogatov, 1972
- Metapenaeopsis tenella Liu & Zhong in R. Liu & Zhong, 1983
- Metapenaeopsis toloensis Hall, 1962
- Metapenaeopsis vaillanti (Nobili, 1904)
- Metapenaeopsis velutina (Dana, 1852)
- Metapenaeopsis wellsi Racek, 1967
