= Microchela =

Microchela Temporal range: Cenomanian

Scientific classification
- Kingdom: Animalia
- Phylum: Arthropoda
- Class: Malacostraca
- Order: Decapoda
- Suborder: Dendrobranchiata
- Family: Penaeidae
- Genus: †Microchela; Garassino, 1994
- Species: †M. rostrata

Binomial name
- †Microchela rostrata Garassino, 1994

Extinct genus of crustaceans

Microchela is an extinct genus of prawn, which contains a single species Microchela rostrata.
