= Rhodanicaris =

Rhodanicaris Temporal range: Callovian

Scientific classification
- Kingdom: Animalia
- Phylum: Arthropoda
- Class: Malacostraca
- Order: Decapoda
- Suborder: Dendrobranchiata
- Family: Penaeidae
- Genus: †Rhodanicaris; Van Straelen, 1924
- Species: †R. depereti

Binomial name
- †Rhodanicaris depereti Van Straelen, 1925

Extinct genus of crustaceans

Rhodanicaris is an extinct genus of prawn which is preserved in the Callovian la Voulte-sur-Rhône lagerstätte. The only species in the genus is Rhodanicaris depereti.
