= Micropenaeus =

Micropenaeus Temporal range: Albian

Scientific classification
- Kingdom: Animalia
- Phylum: Arthropoda
- Class: Malacostraca
- Order: Decapoda
- Suborder: Dendrobranchiata
- Family: Penaeidae
- Genus: †Micropenaeus; Bravi & Garassino, 1998
- Species: †M. tenuirostris

Binomial name
- †Micropenaeus tenuirostris Bravi & Garassino, 1998

Extinct genus of crustaceans

Micropenaeus is an extinct genus of prawns in the order Decapoda. It was first named in 1998 by Sergio Bravi and Alessandro Garassino. The only species is Micropenaeus tenuirostris.
