= Libanocaris =

Scientific classification
- Domain: Eukaryota
- Kingdom: Animalia
- Phylum: Arthropoda
- Class: Malacostraca
- Order: Decapoda
- Suborder: Dendrobranchiata
- Family: Penaeidae
- Genus: †Libanocaris; Garassino, 1994

Extinct genus of crustaceans

Libanocaris is an extinct genus of prawn, containing two species, Libanocaris curvirostra and Libanocaris rogeri.
