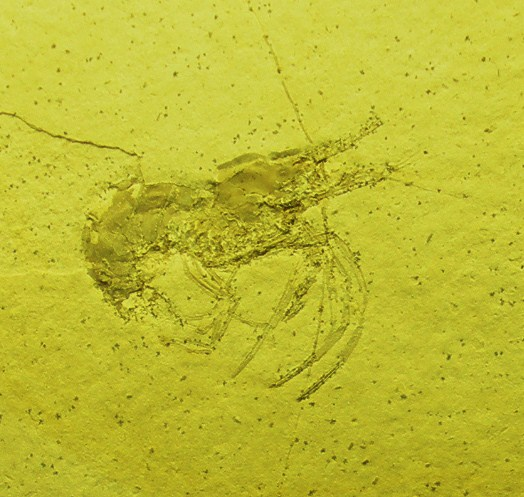

Scientific classification
- Domain: Eukaryota
- Kingdom: Animalia
- Phylum: Arthropoda
- Class: Malacostraca
- Order: Decapoda
- Suborder: Dendrobranchiata
- Family: Penaeidae
- Genus: †Bylgia; Münster, 1839

= Bylgia =

Bylgia Temporal range: Late Jurassic, 152.2–145.1 Ma

Extinct genus of crustaceans

Bylgia is an extinct genus of prawns in the family Penaeidae, containing 3 or 4 species. It is known from the Jurassic of Germany.

== Species ==
The World Register of Marine Species recognizes the following species:

- †Bylgia anjobea Winkler, 2016
- †Bylgia ruedeli Schweigert & Garassino, 2004
- †Bylgia spinosa Münster, 1839

== See also ==
- List of prehistoric malacostracans
