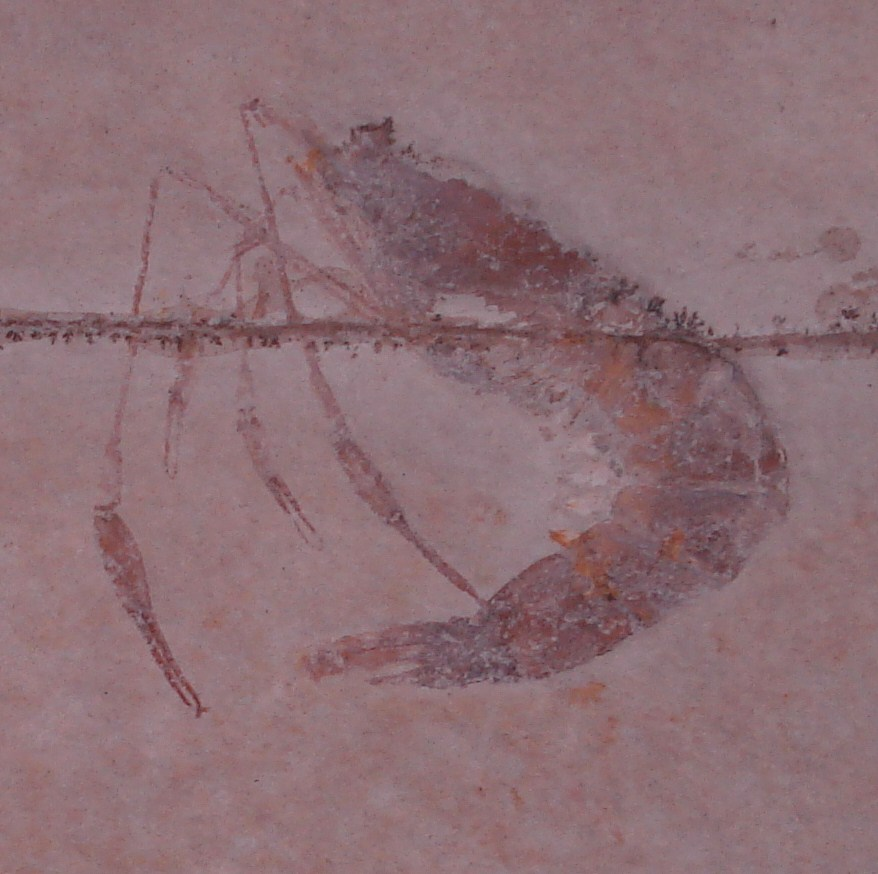
- Fossil of Dusa

Scientific classification
- Domain: Eukaryota
- Kingdom: Animalia
- Phylum: Arthropoda
- Class: Malacostraca
- Order: Decapoda
- Suborder: Dendrobranchiata
- Family: Penaeidae
- Genus: Dusa; Münster, 1839

= Dusa (crustacean) =

Extinct genus of crustaceans

Dusa is an extinct genus of prawns, in the order Decapoda, containing five species.
