= Carinacaris =

Carinacaris Temporal range: Cretaceous

Scientific classification
- Domain: Eukaryota
- Kingdom: Animalia
- Phylum: Arthropoda
- Class: Malacostraca
- Order: Decapoda
- Suborder: Dendrobranchiata
- Family: Penaeidae
- Genus: †Carinacaris; Garassino, 1994
- Species: †C. teruzzii

Binomial name
- †Carinacaris teruzzii Garassino, 1994

Extinct genus of crustaceans

Carinacaris is an extinct genus of penaeid shrimps in the family Penaeidae. There is one described species in Carinacaris, C. teruzzii.
