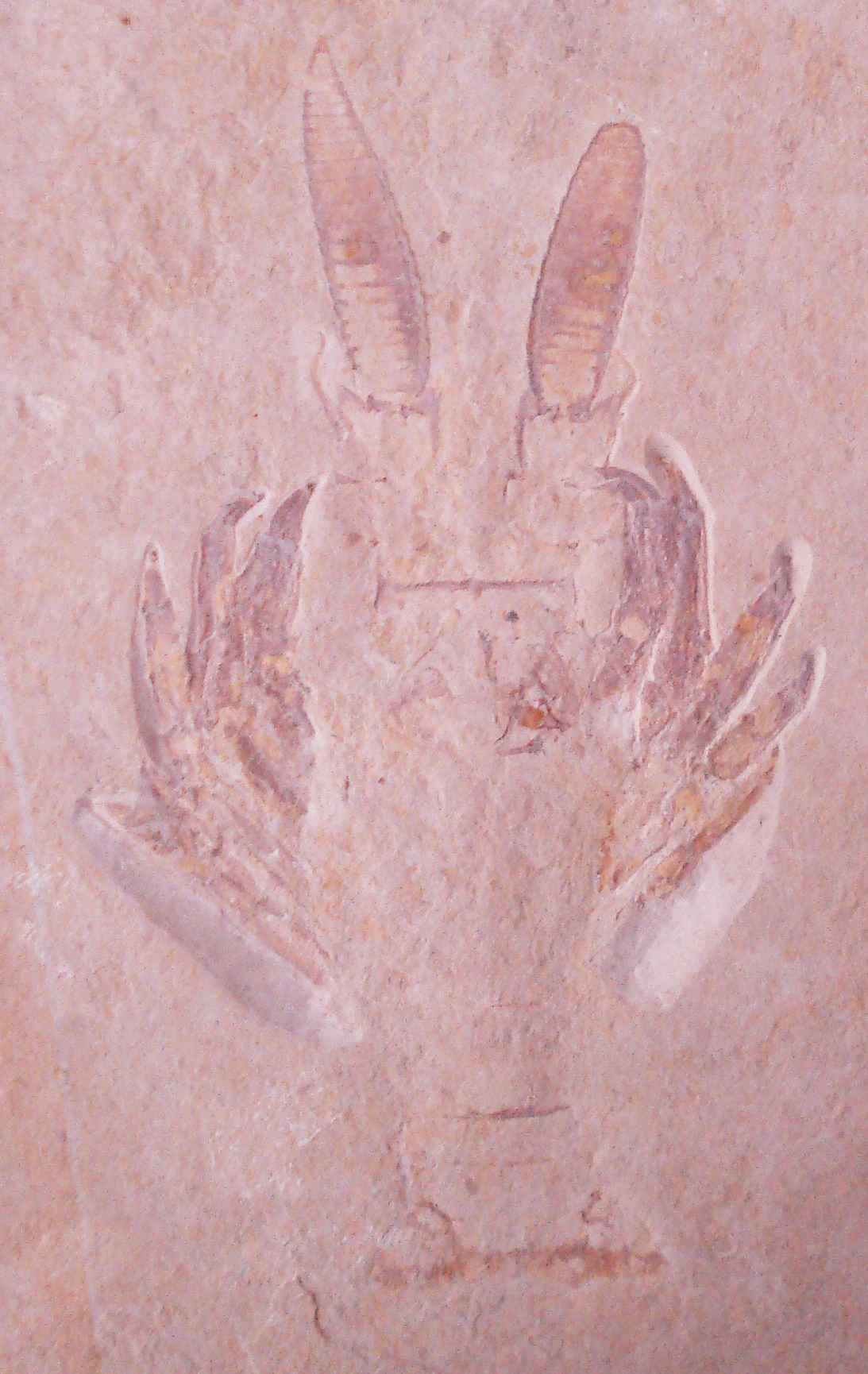

Scientific classification
- Kingdom: Animalia
- Phylum: Arthropoda
- Class: Malacostraca
- Order: Decapoda
- Suborder: Pleocyemata
- Family: †Cancrinidae
- Genus: †Cancrinos; Münster, 1839
- Species: †C. claviger

Binomial name
- †Cancrinos claviger Münster, 1839

= Cancrinos =

Cancrinos Temporal range: Late Jurassic

Extinct genus of crustaceans

Cancrinos is a genus of fossil crustaceans closely allied with the slipper lobsters. One species is known, C. claviger from the Jurassic of southern Germany.

== Taxonomy ==
Fossils of Cancrinos are rare, and their state of preservation is often imperfect. Count Georg zu Münster first described Cancrinos in 1839, based on material from the Upper Jurassic Solnhofen limestones of southern Germany. He described two species, Cancrinos claviger and C. latipes, differentiated by the size of the second antennae, but the two are now considered to be synonyms.

Further specimens have been discovered in Upper Cretaceous lithographic limestones of Lebanon, and described as a new species, C. libanensis; however, Haug et al. (2016) made it the type species of a separate genus Paracancrinos.

== Classification ==
Although Münster was unable to discern any living relatives of Cancrinos during his original description, Reinhard Förster proposed in 1984 that Cancrinos was a transitional form between spiny lobsters (Palinuridae) and slipper lobsters (Scyllaridae).

== Description ==
Living relatives of Cancrinos

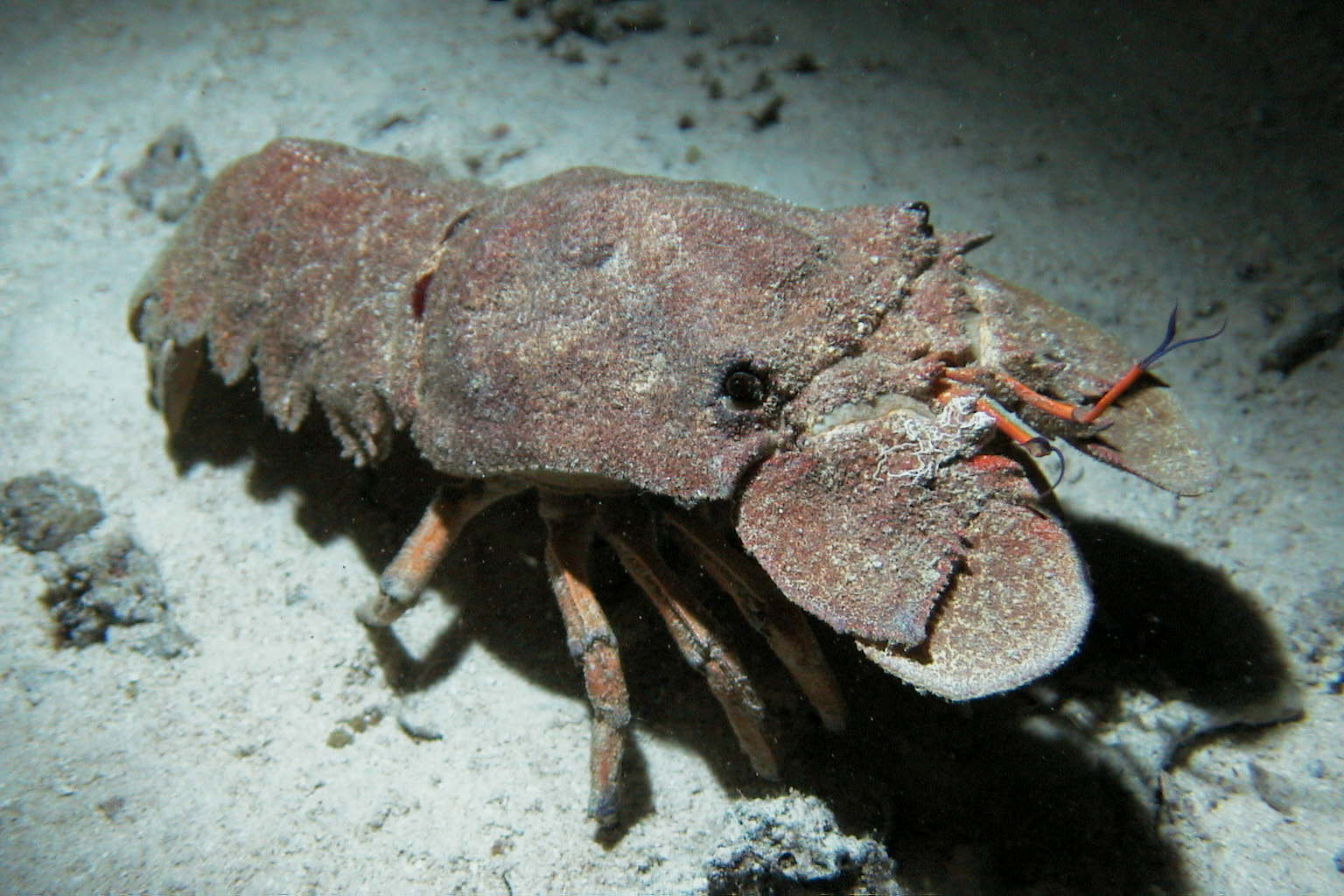
Slipper lobsters, such as this Scyllarides latus, have second antennae where the distal part is reduced to a single flattened element.

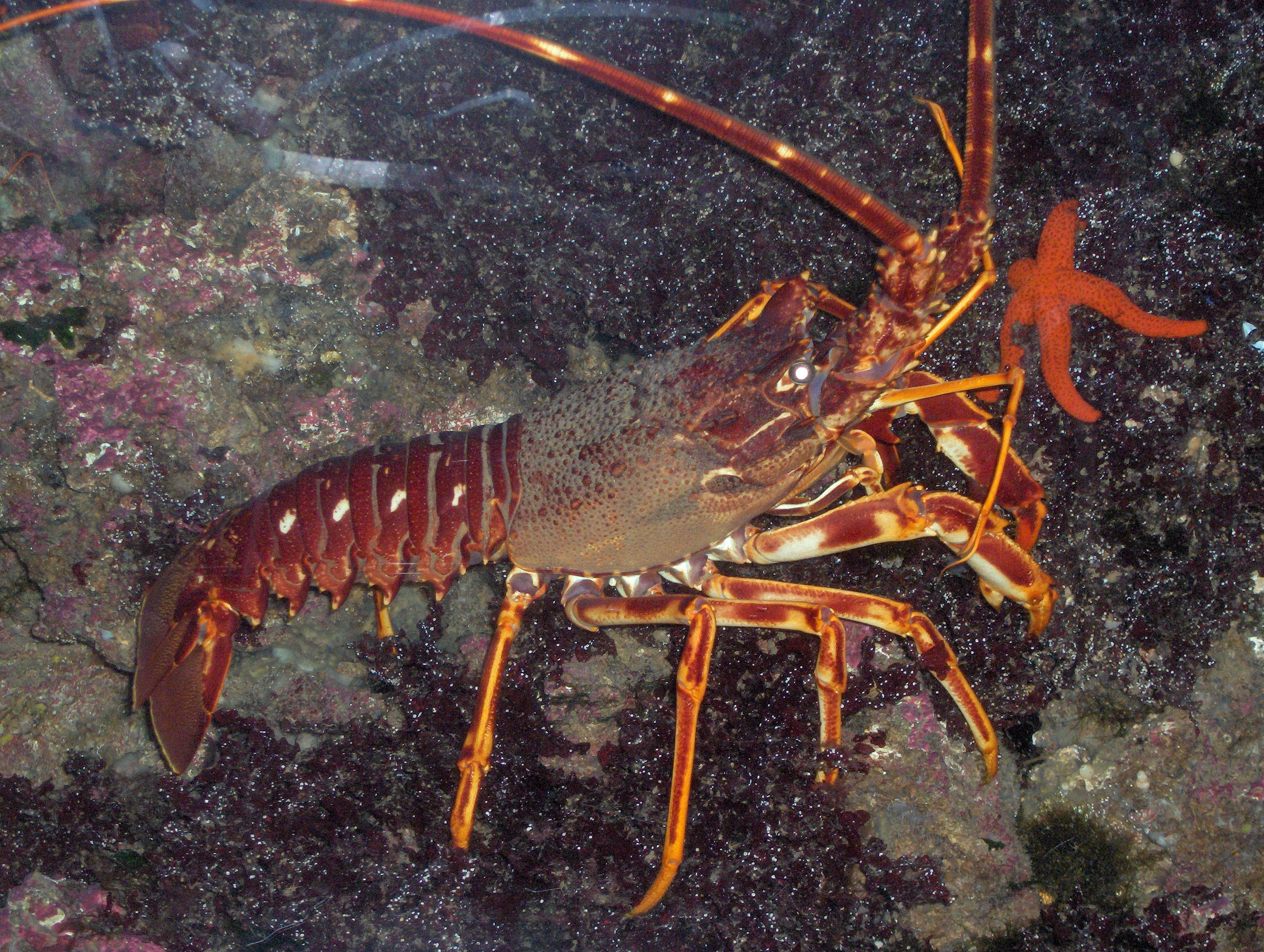
Spiny lobsters, such as this Palinurus elephas, have long second antennae, made up of countless segments.

Cancrinos differs most markedly from other related animals by the form of the second antennae, which are flattened towards the end, approaching the state seen in living slipper lobsters. Unlike living slipper lobsters, however, the flattened, distal parts of the antennae retain the ancestral state of comprising many segments, rather than being reduced to a single element.

=== Development ===
Because immature specimens have been found, parts of the ontogeny of Cancrinos are known, although it is unclear whether the smallest specimens are in the puerulus stage, or are juveniles. Younger specimens have less flattened antennae, more like those of living spiny lobsters; thus, Canrcinos exhibits a form of heterochrony known as peramorphosis. This ontogeny is thought to reflect the phylogeny of Cancrinos, representing a partial development from the ancestral spiny lobster-like form towards the derived slipper lobster-like form.
