= Blaculla =

Blaculla Temporal range: Late Jurassic

Scientific classification
- Kingdom: Animalia
- Phylum: Arthropoda
- Class: Malacostraca
- Order: Decapoda
- Suborder: Pleocyemata
- Infraorder: Caridea
- Genus: †Blaculla; Münster, 1839

Extinct genus of crustaceans

Blaculla is an extinct genus of shrimp. It existed during the Late Jurassic period, and contains the species Blaculla brevipes, Blaculla felthausetsauteri, Blaculla nikoides and Blaculla sieboldi.
