= Pseudodusa =

Pseudodusa Temporal range: Tithonian

Scientific classification
- Kingdom: Animalia
- Phylum: Arthropoda
- Class: Malacostraca
- Order: Decapoda
- Suborder: Dendrobranchiata
- Family: Penaeidae
- Genus: †Pseudodusa; Schweigert & Garassino, 2004
- Species: †P. frattigianii

Binomial name
- †Pseudodusa frattigianii Schweigert & Garassino, 2004

Extinct genus of crustaceans

Pseudodusa is an extinct genus of prawn, containing only the species Pseudodusa frattigianii, known from the Solnhofen limestones of southern Germany.
