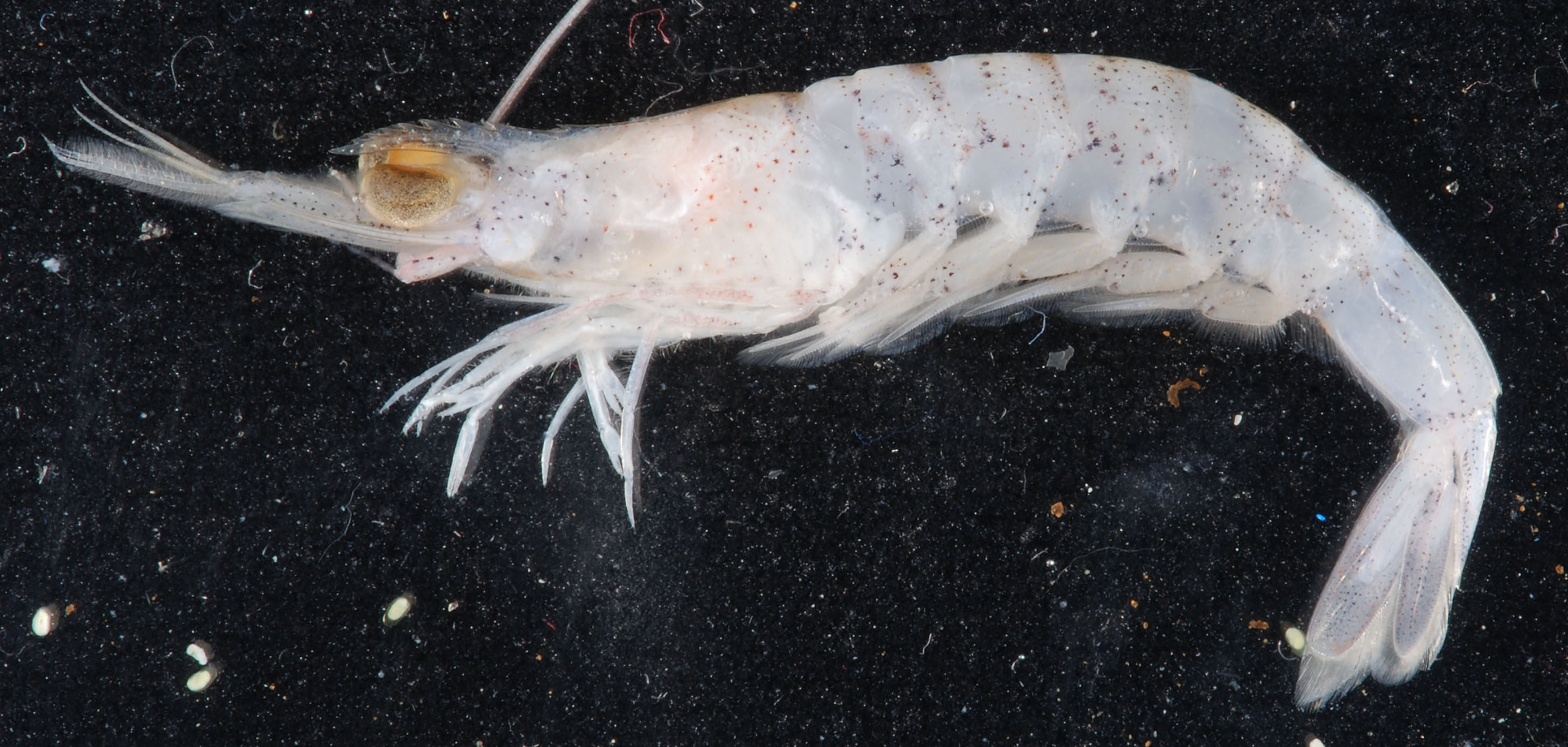
- Rimapenaeus constrictus

Scientific classification
- Domain: Eukaryota
- Kingdom: Animalia
- Phylum: Arthropoda
- Class: Malacostraca
- Order: Decapoda
- Suborder: Dendrobranchiata
- Family: Penaeidae
- Genus: Rimapenaeus; Pérez Farfante & Kensley, 1997

Type species
- Penaeus constrictus Stimpson, 1871

= Rimapenaeus =

Genus of crustaceans

Rimapenaeus is a genus of prawns. It comprises six species, including the "roughneck shrimp", Rimapenaeus constrictus:

- Rimapenaeus byrdi (Burkenroad, 1934)
- Rimapenaeus constrictus (Stimpson, 1871)
- Rimapenaeus faoe (Obarrio, 1954)
- Rimapenaeus fuscina (Pérez Farfante, 1971)
- Rimapenaeus pacificus (Burkenroad, 1934)
- Rimapenaeus similis (Smith, 1885)
