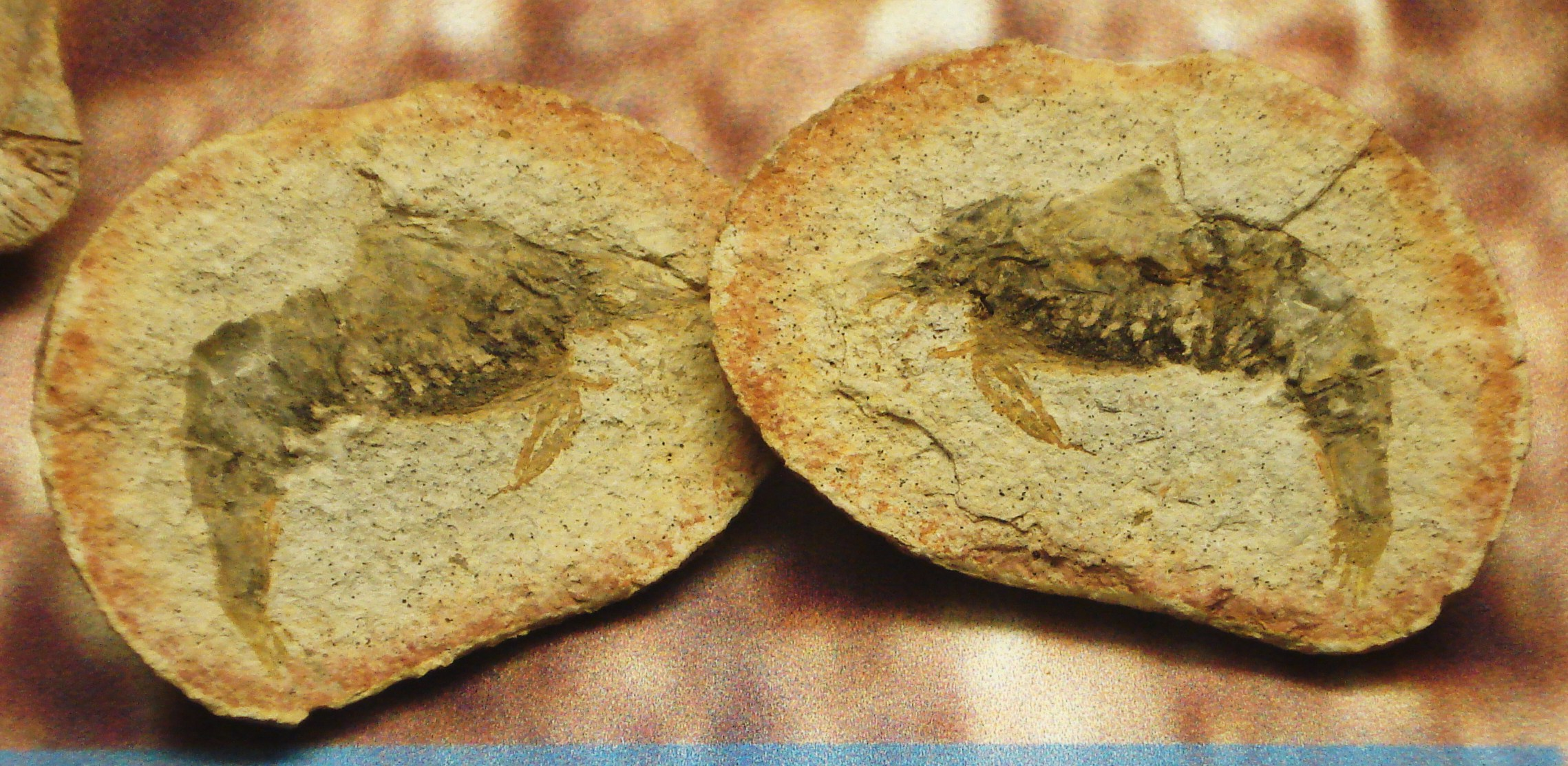
- Fossils of Ifasya madagascariensis

Scientific classification
- Domain: Eukaryota
- Kingdom: Animalia
- Phylum: Arthropoda
- Class: Malacostraca
- Order: Decapoda
- Suborder: Dendrobranchiata
- Family: Penaeidae
- Genus: †Ifasya; Garassino & Teruzzi, 1995

= Ifasya =

Ifasya Temporal range: Lower Triassic

Extinct genus of crustaceans

Ifasya is an extinct genus of prawns. It contains the species Ifasya madagascariensis and Ifasya straelini, and was named in 1995 by Alessandro Garassino and Giorgio Teruzzi. It existed in Madagascar during the Lower Triassic period.
