= Freshwater prawn farming =

Aquaculture of shrimp or prawns

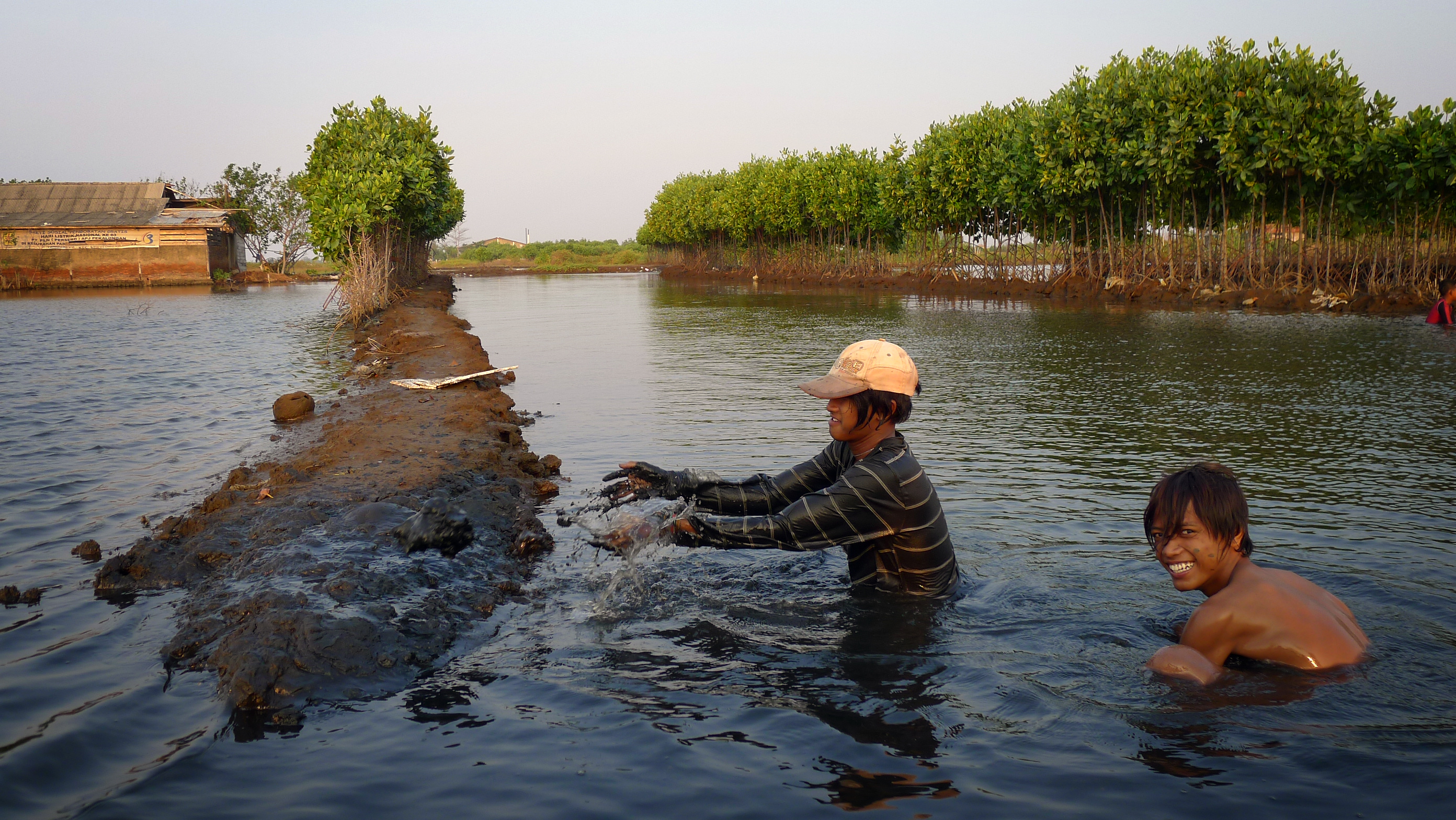
A farmer constructing a shrimp farm in Pekalongan, Indonesia

A freshwater prawn farm is an aquaculture business designed to raise and produce freshwater prawns or shrimp^{1} for human consumption. Freshwater prawn farming shares many characteristics with, and many of the same problems as, marine shrimp farming. Unique problems are introduced by the developmental life cycle of the main species (the giant river prawn, Macrobrachium rosenbergii).

The global annual production of freshwater prawns (excluding crayfish and crabs) in 2003 was about 280,000 tons, of which China produced some 180,000 tons, followed by India and Thailand with some 35,000 tons each. Additionally, China produced about 370,000 tons of Chinese river crab (Eriocheir sinensis).

== Species ==
All farmed freshwater prawns today belong to the genus Macrobrachium. Until 2000, the only species farmed was the giant river prawn (Macrobrachium rosenbergii, also known as the Malaysian prawn). Since then, China has begun farming the Oriental river prawn (M. nipponense) in large quantities, and India farms a small amount of monsoon river prawn (M. malcolmsonii). In 2003, these three species accounted for all farmed freshwater prawns, about two-thirds M. rosenbergii and one-third M. nipponense.

About 200 species in the genus Macrobrachium live in the tropical and subtropical climates on all continents except Europe and Antarctica.

== Biology of Macrobrachium rosenbergii ==
Giant river prawns live in turbid freshwater, but their larval stages require brackish water to survive. Males can reach a body size of 32 cm; females grow to 25 cm. In mating, the male deposits spermatophores on the underside of the female's thorax, between the walking legs. The female then extrudes eggs, which pass through the spermatophores. The female carries the fertilized eggs with her until they hatch; the time may vary, but is generally less than three weeks. A large female may lay up to 100,000 eggs.

From these eggs hatch zoeae, the first larval stage of crustaceans. They drift towards brackish waters where they go through several larval stages before metamorphosing into postlarvae, at which stage they are about 8 mm long and have all the characteristics of adults. This metamorphosis usually takes place about 32 to 35 days after hatching. These postlarvae then migrate back into freshwater.

There are three different morphotypes of males. The first stage is called "small male" (SM); this smallest stage has short, nearly translucent claws. If conditions allow, small males grow and metamorphose into "orange claw" (OC) males, which have large orange claws on their second chelipeds, which may have a length of 0.8 to 1.4 times their body size. OC males later may transform into the third and final stage, the "blue claw" (BC) males. These have blue claws, and their second chelipeds may become twice as long as their body.

Male M. rosenbergii prawns have a strict hierarchy: the territorial BC males dominate the OCs, which in turn dominate the SMs. The presence of BC males inhibits the growth of SMs and delays the metamorphosis of OCs into BCs; an OC will keep growing until it is larger than the largest BC male in its neighbourhood before transforming. All three male stages are sexually active, though, and females which have undergone their premating molt will cooperate with any male to reproduce. BC males protect the females until their shells have hardened; OCs and SMs show no such behavior.

== Technology ==
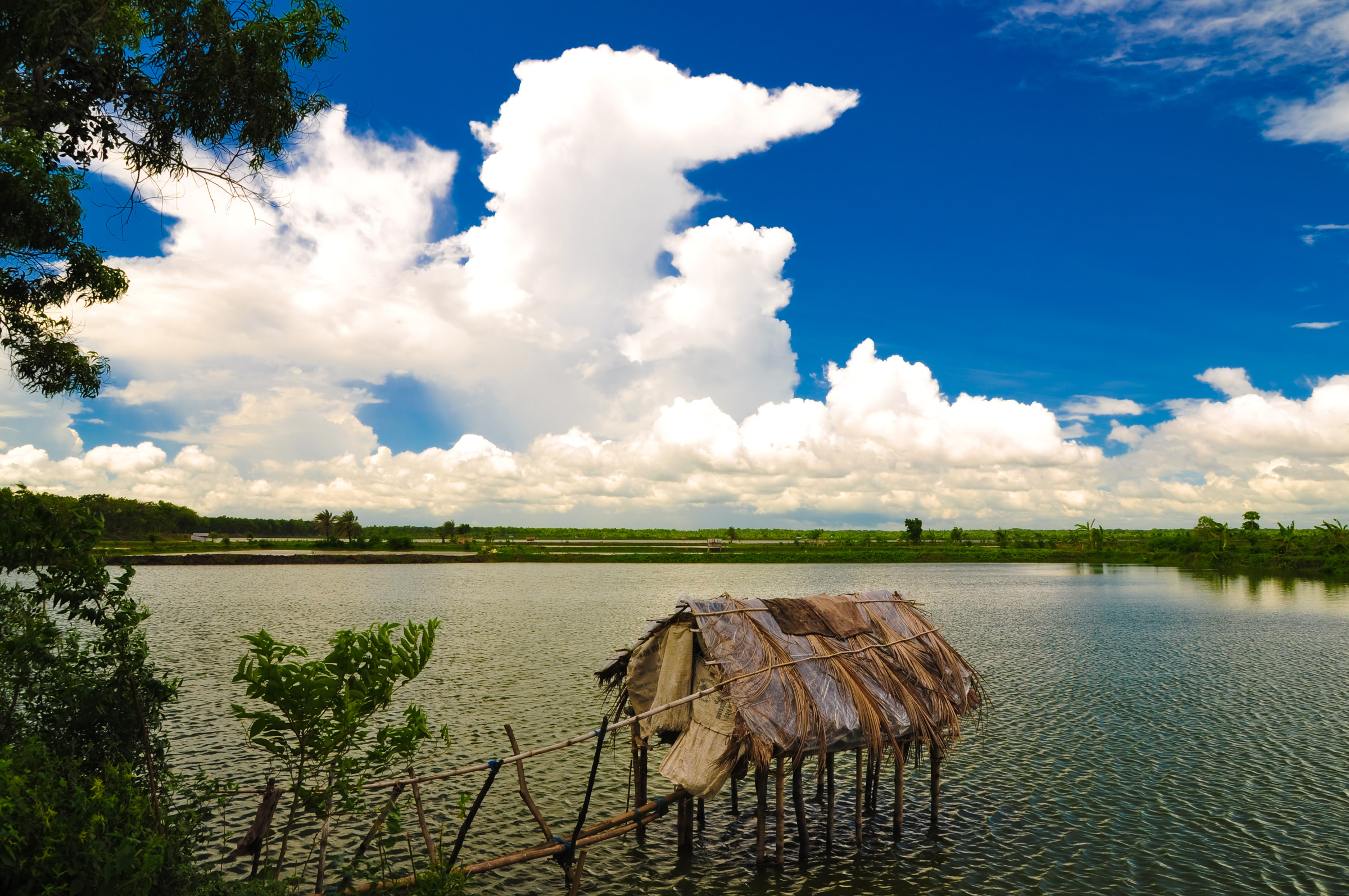
Freshwater prawn farm in Bangladesh.

Giant river prawns have been farmed using traditional methods in Southeast Asia for a long time. First experiments with artificial breeding cultures of M. rosenbergii were done in the early 1960s in Malaysia, where it was discovered that the larvae needed brackish water for survival. Industrial-scale rearing processes were perfected in the early 1970s in Hawaii, and spread first to Taiwan and Thailand, and then to other countries.

The technologies used in freshwater prawn farming are basically the same as in marine shrimp farming. Hatcheries produce postlarvae, which then are grown and acclimated in nurseries before being transferred into growout ponds, where the prawns are then fed and grown until they reach marketable size. Harvesting is done by either draining the pond and collecting the animals ("batch" harvesting) or by fishing the prawns out of the pond using nets (continuous operation).

Due to the aggressive nature of M. rosenbergii and the hierarchy between males, stocking densities are much lower than in marine penaeid shrimp farms. Intensive farming is not possible due to the increased level of cannibalism, so all farms are either stocked semi-intensively (4 to 20 postlarvae per square metre) or, in extensive farms, at even lower densities (1 to 4/m^{2}). The management of the growout ponds must take into account the growth characteristics of M. rosenbergii: the presence of blue-claw males inhibits the growth of small males, and delays the metamorphosis of OC males into BCs. Some farms fish off the largest prawns from the pond using seines to ensure a healthy composition of the pond's population, designed to optimize the yield, even if they employ batch harvesting. The heterogeneous individual growth of M. rosenbergii makes growth control necessary even if a pond is stocked newly, starting from scratch: some animals will grow faster than others and become dominant BCs, stunting the growth of other individuals.

The FAO considers the ecological impact of freshwater prawn farming to be less severe than in shrimp farming. The prawns are cultured at much lower densities, meaning less concentrated waste products and a lesser danger of the ponds becoming breeding places for diseases. The growout ponds do not salinate agricultural land, as do those of inland marine shrimp farms. However, the lower yield per area means that the income per Ha is also lower and a given area can support fewer humans. This limits the culture area to low value lands where intensification is not required. Freshwater prawn farms do not endanger mangroves, and are better amenable to small-scale businesses run by a family. However, like marine farmed shrimp, M. rosenbergii is also susceptible to a variety of viral or bacterial diseases, including white tail disease, also called "white muscle disease".

== Economics ==
The global annual production of freshwater prawns in 2003 was about 280,000 tonnes, of which China produced some 180,000 tonnes, followed by India and Thailand with some 35,000 tonnes each. Other major producer countries are Taiwan, Bangladesh, and Vietnam. In the United States, only a few hundred small farms for M. rosenbergii produced about 50 tonnes in 2003.

== See also ==
- The technologies used in freshwater prawn farming, but also the ecological problems associated with this industry, are basically the same as for marine shrimp farming and are discussed in that article.
