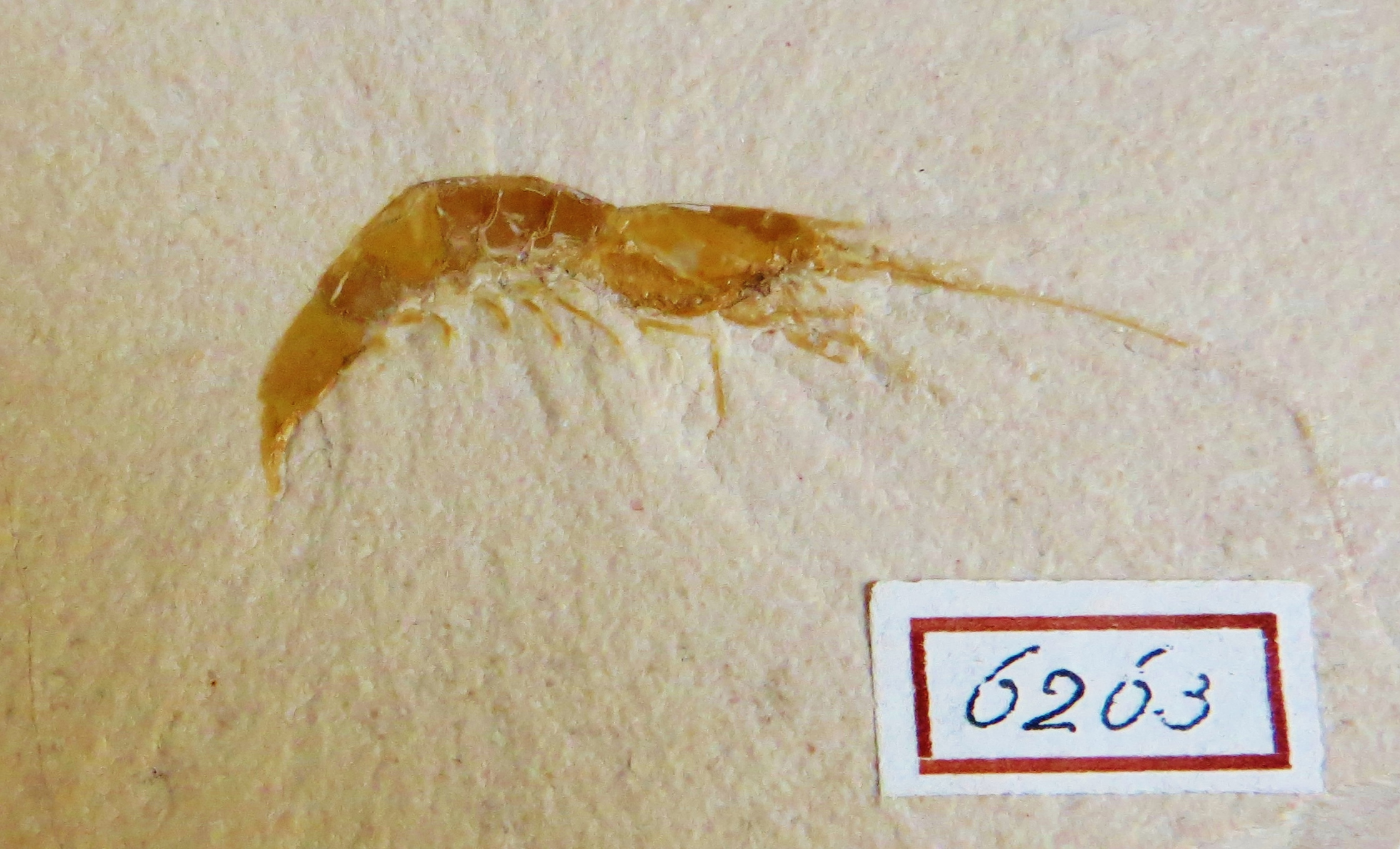
- Hefriga serrata

Scientific classification
- Kingdom: Animalia
- Phylum: Arthropoda
- Clade: Pancrustacea
- Class: Malacostraca
- Order: Decapoda
- Suborder: Pleocyemata
- Infraorder: Caridea
- Family: incertae sedis
- Genus: †Hefriga; Münster, 1839

Type species
- Hefriga serrata Münster, 1839

Species
- Hefriga aonis (Bronn, 1858); Hefriga complicatus (Münster, 1839); Hefriga frischmanni Oppel, 1862; Hefriga norbertwinkleri Schweigert, 2011; Hefriga proboscideawulfi Schweigert & Garassino, 2004; Hefriga rogerfrattigianii Schweigert, 2011; Hefriga schlechtingerae Winkler, 2020; Hefriga serrata Münster, 1839 (type)

Synonyms
- Bombur Münster, 1839

= Hefriga =

Hefriga Temporal range: Tithonian

Extinct genus of crustaceans

Hefriga is an extinct genus of shrimp in the order Decapoda. It lived in the Jurassic period.
