= Georg zu Münster =

German paleontologist (1776–1844)

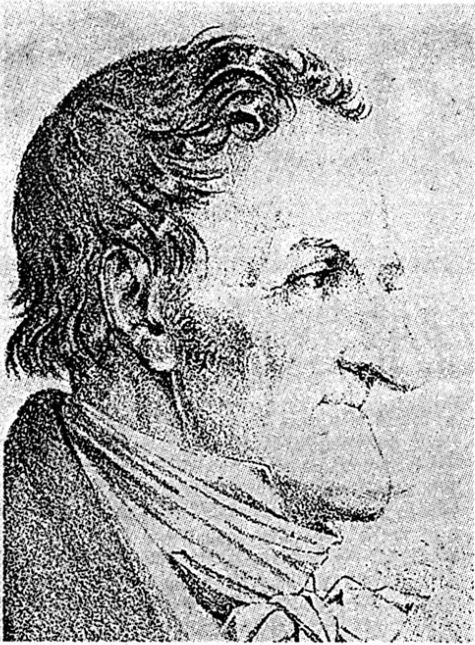
Georg Graf zu Münster

Count Georg Ludwig Friedrich Wilhelm zu Münster (German: Georg Graf zu Münster; 17 February 1776 – 23 December 1844) was a German paleontologist.

== Biography ==
Münster was born on 17 February 1776, in Langelage near Osnabrück. In 1800, he became a Prussian official in the principalities of Brandenburg-Ansbach and Brandenburg-Bayreuth. He formed a famous collection of fossils, which was ultimately secured by the Bavarian state, and formed the nucleus of the palaeontological museum at Munich.

Münster assisted Georg August Goldfuss in writing his great work, Petrefacta Germaniae. Louis Agassiz and Georges Cuvier visited him at Bayreuth, where he donated them part of his collection. He died in Bayreuth on 23 December 1844.

The Graf-Münster-Gymnasium in Bayreuth, the largest school in Bayreuth, founded in 1833, was named in his honour.
