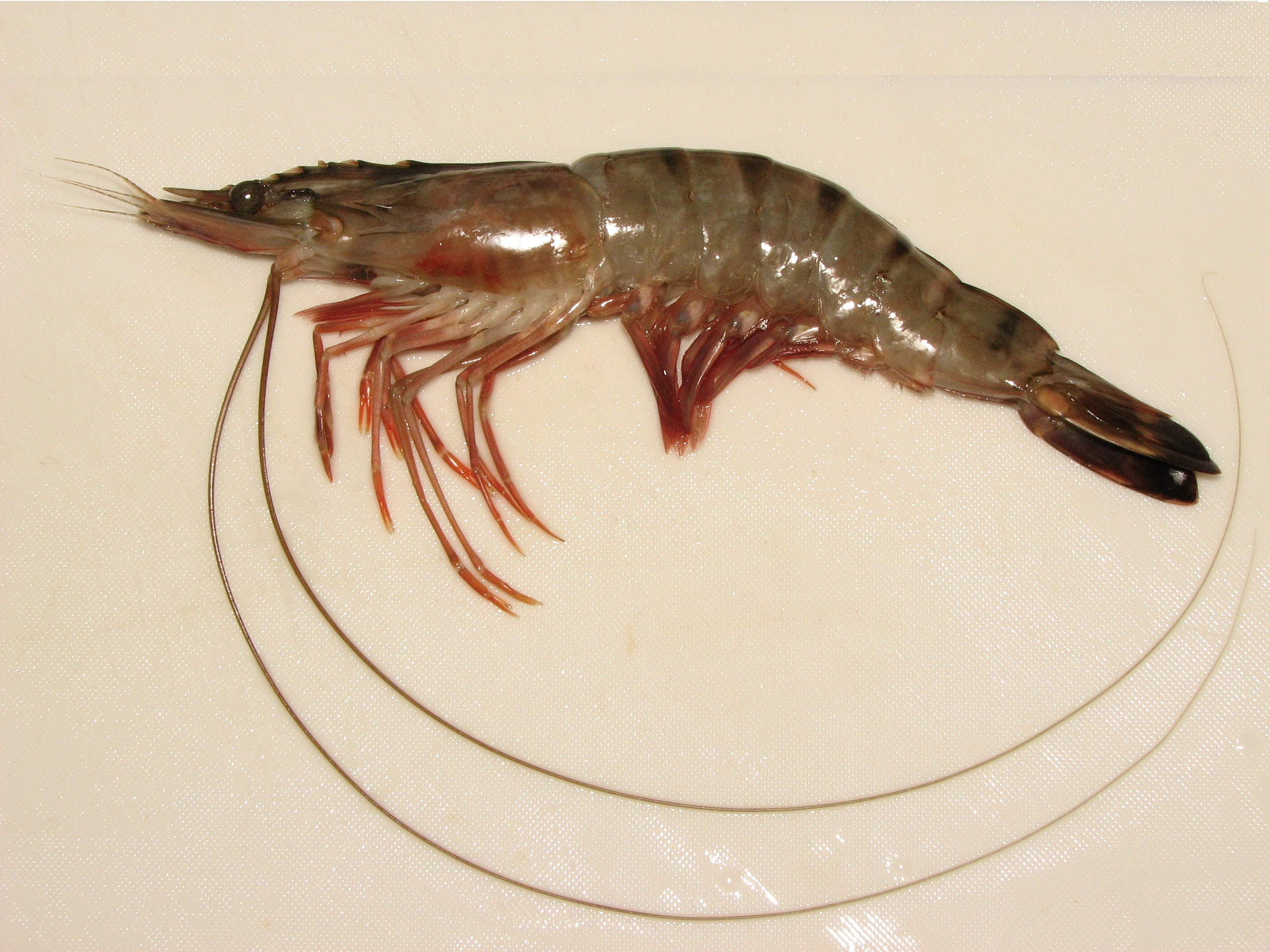
- Penaeus monodon

Scientific classification
- Kingdom: Animalia
- Phylum: Arthropoda
- Class: Malacostraca
- Order: Decapoda
- Suborder: Dendrobranchiata
- Superfamily: Penaeoidea
- Family: Penaeidae; Rafinesque, 1815

= Penaeidae =

Penaeidae Temporal range: Triassic–Recent

Family of crustaceans

Penaeidae is a family of marine crustaceans in the suborder Dendrobranchiata, which are often referred to as penaeid shrimp or penaeid prawns. The Penaeidae contain many species of economic importance, such as the tiger prawn, whiteleg shrimp, Atlantic white shrimp, and Indian prawn. Many prawns are the subject of commercial fishery, and farming, both in marine settings, and in freshwater farms. Lateral line–like sense organs on the antennae have been reported in some species of Penaeidae. At 210 metres per second (760 km/h), the myelinated giant interneurons of pelagic penaeid shrimp have the world record for impulse conduction speed in any animal.

== Genera ==
Of the 48 recognised genera in the family Penaeidae, 23 are known only from the fossil record (marked †):

- † Albertoppelia Schweigert & Garassino, 2004
- † Ambilobeia Garassino & Pasini, 2002
- † Antrimpos Münster, 1839
- Artemesia Bate, 1888
- Atypopenaeus Alcock, 1905
- † Bombur Münster, 1839
- † Bylgia Münster, 1839
- † Carinacaris Garassino, 1994
- † Cretapenaeus Garassino, Pasini & Dutheil, 2006
- † Drobna Münster, 1839
- † Dusa Münster, 1839
- Farfantepenaeus Burukovsky, 1997
- Fenneropenaeus Pérez Farfante, 1969
- Funchalia Johnson, 1868
- † Hakelocaris Garassino, 1994
- Heteropenaeus De Man, 1896
- † Ifasya Garassino & Teruzzi, 1995
- † Koelga Münster, 1839
- † Libanocaris Garassino, 1994
- Litopenaeus Pérez Farfante, 1969
- † Longichela Garassino & Teruzzi, 1993
- † Longitergite Garassino & Teruzzi, 1996
- † Macropenaeus Garassino, 1994
- Macropetasma Stebbing, 1914
- Marsupenaeus Tirmizi, 1971
- Megokris Pérez Farfante & Kensley, 1997
- Melicertus Rafinesque, 1814
- Metapenaeopsis Bouvier, 1905
- Metapenaeus Wood-Mason & Alcock, 1891
- † Microchela Garassino, 1994
- † Micropenaeus Bravi & Garassino, 1998
- Parapenaeopsis Alcock, 1901
- Parapenaeus Smith, 1885
- Pelagopenaeus Pérez Farfante & Kensley, 1997
- Penaeopsis Bate, 1881
- Penaeus Fabricius, 1798
- Protrachypene Burkenroad, 1934
- † Pseudobombur Secretan, 1975
- † Pseudodusa Schweigert & Garassino, 2004
- † Rauna Münster, 1839
- † Rhodanicaris Van Straelen, 1924
- Rimapenaeus Pérez Farfante & Kensley, 1997
- † Satyrocaris Garassino & Teruzzi, 1993
- Tanypenaeus Pérez Farfante, 1972
- Trachypenaeopsis Burkenroad, 1934
- Trachypenaeus Alcock, 1901
- Trachysalambria Burkenroad, 1934
- Xiphopenaeus Smith, 1869
