= Nusplingen Limestone =

Geological Formation in Baden-Württemberg, Germany

- Stratigraphic range: Kimmeridgian
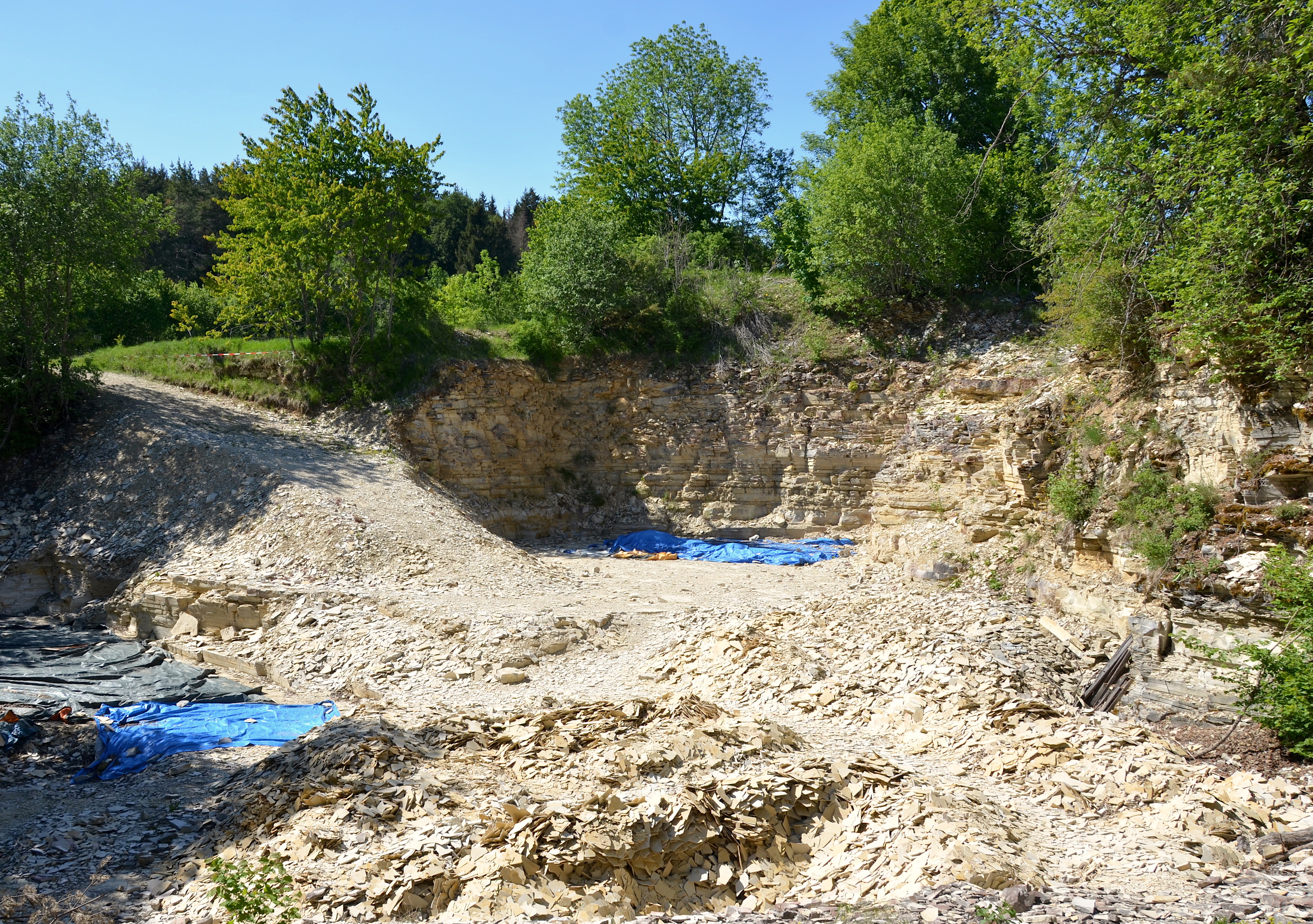
- The Nusplingen quarry
- Type: Formation
- Unit of: Zementmergel Formation
- Underlies: Hangende Bankkalk Formation
- Overlies: Obere Felsenkalk Formation
- Thickness: 10.5–17 m (34–56 ft)

Lithology
- Primary: Lithographic limestone
- Other: Flint

Location
- Coordinates: 48.13193°N 8.8906°E
- Approximate paleocoordinates: 39.2°N 17.7°E
- Region: Baden-Württemberg
- Country: Germany
- Extent: 1.5 km^{2} (0.58 sq mi)

Type section
- Named for: Nusplingen
- Named by: Friedrich August Quenstedt
- Year defined: 1839
- Nusplingen Limestone (Germany)

The Nusplingen Limestone (German: Nusplingen Plattenkalk) is a geological formation in Baden-Württemberg, Germany. It preserves fossils dating to the Kimmeridgian age of the Late Jurassic. It mainly consists of lithographic limestones deposited in a marine basin, similar to the Solnhofen Limestone. Fossils of pterosaurs, thalattosuchians, and the oldest geophilomorph centipede Eogeophilus were found in the Nusplingen Limestone.

== History ==
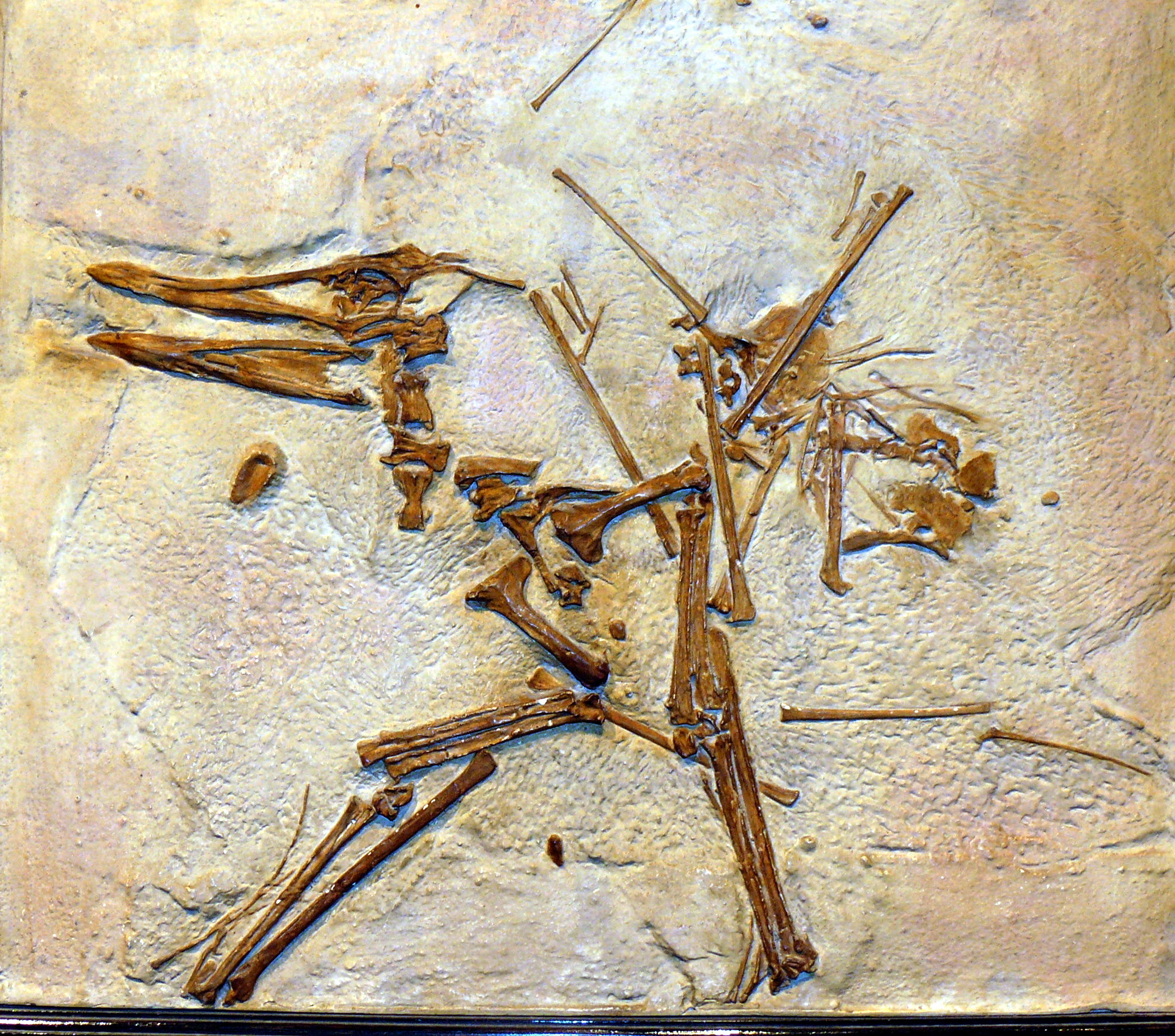
Cycnorhamphus suevicus (formerly Pterodactylus suevicus), one of the first complete pterosaurs from Nusplingen presented by Quenstedt in 1855

The Nusplingen Limestone was first discovered in the first half of the 19th century. In 1839, Friedrich Kinzelbach, a doctor working in Nusplingen, led Friedrich August von Quenstedt to a quarry a farmer used to retrieve floor tiles. Friedrich Kinzelbach presumably led Quenstedt to the locality after hearing his talks about the Solnhofen Limestone. Quenstedt recognized the Importance of the locality, commenting on how fossil-rich the locality is, mentioning numerous fossils of Lumbricaria and numerous fish scales. In 1839, Quenstedt introduced the term "Nusplinger Plattenkalk" (Nusplingen Limestone) for the quarry's limestone. Quenstedt's writing about the locality resulted in the collection of fossil material by the bishop Oskar Fraas. In 1849, he held an essay on the Nusplingen Limestone at the meeting of German naturalists and doctors in Regensburg. Later, in 1850, Count Wilhelm von Württemberg gave a lecture on the concept of sourcing lithography stones from Nusplingen. Oskar Fraas motivated the businessman Christian Fuchs from Stuttgart to start sourcing rock from Nusplingen in 1853, and the first big quarry was created after that. The limestone from Nusplingen was not usable for lithography, but the fossil collection of Oskar Fraas had grown immensely, and Quenstedt also began collecting fossils from the site. Friedrich Eser, who also collected fossils from Nusplingen, called the site a "paternal Solnhofen". In the year 1855, the first pterosaur remains were found, specimens of Rhamphorhynchus and Cycnorhamphus.

In 1896, fossil and mineral dealer Bernhard Stürtz began quarry work in the Nusplingen Limestone once again. This time fossils were the only focus of the quarry workers. The found fossils were offered for sale to the University of Tübingen and the Royal Natural Cabinet in Stuttgart. Among the fossils found in this campaign were a 2 metres (6.6 ft) long Cricosaurus, a specimen of Rhamphorhynchus, and the angelshark Pseudorhina. Only 30 years after the dig by Stürtz did an excavation with a scientific focus begin, when in 1929 the University of Tübingen began quarry work from a purely scientific view. This short campaign was very successful, bringing forth a fossil of the large chimaera Ischyodus, and the first research on how the deposit was formed. However, the campaign quickly ran out of funding and came to an end. Work began again in 1935 under Alfred Mayer-Gürr, who was then subsequently replaced by Bruno Fuchs after Alfred left to work in Iraq. Due to World War 2, a detailed overview of this campaign never came to be.

The original owner of the quarry died, and multiple companies tried to buy it for building material. It was then sold to the Verein für vaterländische Naturkunde in Württemberg in an effort to protect the locality, which was subsequently put under conservation. In 1946 the University of Paris led a campaign, though what happened to the fossils found in this campaign is unknown. It took 14 years for the next campaign to start in 1962, undertaken by the University of Tübingen; this campaign was treated as unsuccessful and was stopped after a few months.

In the year 1980, new information came to light on the extent of the Nusplingen Limestone. In Egesheim, a new quarry exposing rocks of the Nusplingen Limestone was established only 250 meters away from the previous site. Afraid the fossils would get destroyed by the quarry work, the Natural History Museum of Stuttgart requested the whole extent of the Nusplingen Limestone to be put under protection, which was then accepted on 25 November 1983. Afraid of fossil thieves, sample digs were started by the SMNH to determine how threatened the fossil richness of the fossil site was. With the subsequent find of a complete shark skeleton of the genus Sphenodus, the museum invested in a research campaign which started in 1994 in the old Nusplingen quarry, and in 1993 in the Egesheimer quarry. The campaign has yet to stop.

== Dating ==
Lithographic limestones are a common occurrence throughout the Late Jurassic, which is why many geologists used to believe that they were deposited at the same time. Friedrich August von Quenstedt defined these together with deposits in the Swabian Alps as "Weißjura zeta". Nowadays Ammonite-Zones are used to date these deposits more clearly. Analysis of the ammonite fauna has now shown that the Nusplingen Limestone is around 0.5 million years older than the Solnhofen Limestone, which makes it late Kimmeridgian in age.

== Paleobiota ==
The Nusplingen Limestone has yielded a rich variety of fossil material, including plants, decapod crustaceans, Insects, fish, cephalopods and pterosaurs, as well as an isolated feather of a dinosaur.

Source is unless mentioned otherwise.

=== Porifera ===
Genus	Species	Notes	Images
Codites	C. dubius		
Codites	C. serpentinus		
Codites	C. subarticulatus		
Crispispongia	C. stolata		
Cypellia	C. sp		
Laocoetis	L. schweiggeri		
Peronidella	P. cylindrica		
Stauroderma	S. sp		
Trochobolus	T. dentatus		
Trochobolus	T. sp		
Verrucocoelia	V. sp		

=== Anthozoa ===
Genus	Species	Notes	Images
Trochocyathus	T. sp		

=== Mollusca ===
==== Lamellibranchiata ====
Genus	Species	Notes	Images
Actinostreon	A. gregareum		
Arca	A. fracta		
Camptonectes	C. auritus		
Chlamys	C. textoria		
Cingentolium	C. cingulatum		
Ctenostreon	C. pectiniforme		
Eopecten	E. velatus		
Liostrea	L. roemeri		
Liostrea	L. socialis		
Nanogyra	N. virgula		
Plagiostoma	P. pratzi		
Propeamussium	P. nonarium		
Pseudolimea	P. duplicata		
Radulopecten	R. sigmaringensis		
Spondylopecten	S. palinurus		
Spondylopecten	S. subspinosus		

==== Gastropoda ====
Genus	Species	Notes	images
Amberleya	A. sp		
Leptomaria	L. umbilicata		

==== Ammonoidea ====
Genus	Species	Notes	Images
Aspidoceras	A. catalaunicum		
Euvirgalithacoceras	E. sp		
Glochiceras	G. lens		
Granulochetoceras	G. ornatum		
Hybonotella	H. sp		
Hybonoticeras	H. harpephorum		
Hybonoticeras	H. sp		
Lingulaticeras	L. sp		
Lingulaticeras	L. pseudopercevali		
Lithacoceras	L. fasciferum		
Lithacoceras	L. onukii		
Lithacoceras	L. ulmense		
Neochetoceras	N. praecursor		
Neochetoceras	N. subnudatum		
Ochetoceras	O. zio		
Physodoceras	P. nattheimense		
Silicisphinctes	S. hoelderi		
Silicisphinctes	S. keratinitiformis		
Silicisphinctes	S. oxypleurus		
Silicisphinctes	S. russi		
Streblites	S. zlatarskii		
Subplanites	S. sp		
Sutneria	S. rebholzi		
Taramelliceras	T. sp		

==== Nautiloidea ====
Genus	Species	Notes	Images
Cenoceras	C. sp		
Pseudaganides	P. sp		

==== Belemnoidea ====
Genus	Species	Notes	Images
Hibolithes	H. semisulcatus		
Raphibelus	R. acicula		

==== Other Cephalopods ====
Genus	Species	Notes	Images
Deinuncus	D. sp		
Leptotheuthis	L. gigas		
Parloviteuthis	P. kapitzkei		
Pearceiteuthis	P. sp		
Plesioteuthis	P. prisca		
Patelloctopus	P. ilgi		
Trachyteuthis	T. hastiformis		
Trachyteuthis	T. nusplingensis		

=== Polychaetes ===
Genus	Species	Notes	Images
Eunicites	E. proavus		
Ficopomatus	F. sp		
Muensteria	M. lacunosa		
Muensteria	M. encoelioides		
Serpula	S. sp		
Terebella	T. sp		

=== Insecta ===
Multiple unnamed beetles and a crane fly are known from the Locality

Genus	Species	Notes	Images
Aeschnidium	A. densum		
Cymatophlebia	C. longialata		
Cymatophlebia	C. sp		
Orthophlebia	O. sp		
Stenophlebia	S. rolfhuggeri		
Brunateaschnidum	B. nusplingensis		

=== Chilopoda ===
Genus	Species	Notes	Images
Eogeophilus	E. nusplingensis		

=== Limulidae ===
Genus	Species	Notes	Images
Mesolimulus	M. walchii		

=== Crustaceans ===
==== Natantia ====
Genus	Species	Notes	Images
Acanthochirana	A. sp		
Aeger	A. tipularius		
Antrimpos	A. nonodon		
Antrimpos	A. undenarius		
Buergerocaris	B. psittacoides		
Bylgia	B. spinosa		
Bylgia	B. sp		
Dusa	D. araneae		
Dusa	D. monocera		
Harthofia	H. sp		
Hefriga	H. frischmanni		
Hefriga	H. serrata		
Pseudodusa	P. frattigianii		

==== Reptantia ====
Genus	Species	Notes	Images
Coleia	C. longipes		
Cycleryon	C. orbiculatus		
Cycleryon	C. propinquus	Cycleryon spinimanus is a synonym of this species, as they represent sexual dimorphism.	
Knebelia	K. totoroi		
Eryma	E. modestiforme		
Eryma	E. punctatum		
Erymastacus	E. major		
Galicia	G. westphali		
Glyphea	G. pseudoscyllarus		
Palaeastacus	P. fuciformis		
Palaeopentacheles	P. roettenbacheri		
Palinurina	P. sp		
Pseudastacus	P. sp		
Pustulina	P. minuta		
Pustulina	P. suevica		

==== Mysidacea ====
Genus	Species	Notes	Images
Elder	E. ungulatus		
Naranda	N. anomala		

==== Other Crustaceans ====
Genus	Species	Notes	Images
Sculda	S. spinosa	small Stomatopod	
Palaega	P. nusplingensis	Isopoda	
Eolepas	E. quenstedti	goose barnacle	

=== Tylacocephala ===
Genus	Species	Infos	Images
Mayrocaris	M. bucculata		

=== Brachiopoda ===
Genus	Species	Notes	Images
Cheirothyris	C. fleuriausa		
Juralina	J. insigne		
Lacunosella	L. sp		
Ornithella	O. pentagonalis		
Rioultina	R. sp		
Terebratulina	T. substriata		
Torquirhynchia	T. speciosa		

=== Echinodermata ===
==== Echinoidea ====
Genus	Species	Notes	Images
Diplocidaris	D. cladifera		
Diplopodia	D. subungularis		
Gymnocidaris	G. sp		
Holectypus	H. orificatus		
Nenoticidaris	N. hsitricoides		
Paracidaris	P. florigemma		
Plegiocidaris	P. crucifera		
Polycidaris	P. nusplingensis		
Rhabdocidaris	R. boehmi		
Stomechinus	S. perlatus		

==== Asteroidea ====
Genus	Species	Notes	Images
Sphaeraster	S. granulatus		
Tylasteria	T. jurensis		

==== Ophiuroidea ====
Genus	Species	Notes	Images
Sinosura	S. kelheimense		

==== Crinoidea ====
Genus	Species	Notes	images
Comaturella	C. formosa		
Millericrinus	M. milleri		
Plicatocrinus	P. fraasi		
Saccocoma	S. tenella		
Solanocrinites	S. sp		

=== Vertebrates ===
==== Elasmobranchii ====
Genus	Species	Notes	images
Belemnobatis	B. sismondae		
Heterodontus	H. falcifer		
Notidanoides	N. muensteri		
Notidanoides	N. serratus		
Palaeoscyllium	P. sp		
Paraorthacodus	P. jurensis		
Pseudorhina	P. acanthoderma		
Sphenodus	S. macer		
Sphenodus	S. nitidus		
Synechodus	S. ungeri		

==== Holocephali ====
Genus	Species	Notes	Images
Elasmodectes	E. avitus		
Ischyodus	I. quenstedti		

==== Crossopterygii ====
Genus	Species	Notes	Images
Coccoderma	C. suevicum		
Undina	U. penicillata		

==== Actinopterygii ====
Genus	Species	Notes	Images
Allothrissops	A. mesogaster		
Allothrissops	A. sp		
Anaethalion	A. angustus		
Anaethalion	A. cirinensis		
Aspidorhynchus	A. acutirostris		
Caturus	C. furcatus		
Eurycormus	E. speciosus		
Eurypoma	E. grande		
Furo	F. aldingeri		
Furo	F. microlepidotus		
Furo	F. praelongus	Junior Synonym of F. muensteri	
Furo	F. sp		
Gyrodus	G. circularis		
Hypsocormus	H. macrodon		
Ionoscopus	I. cyprinoides		
Leptolepides	L. sprattiformis		
Ophiopsis	O. procera		
Sanctusichthys	S. rieteri		
Siemensichthys	S. macrocephalus		
Simocormus	S. macrolepidotus		
Solnhofenamia	S. elongata		
Tharsis	T. dubius		
Thrissops	T. subovatus		

==== Testudinata ====
Genus	Species	Notes	Images
Eurysternum	E. sp		

==== Pseudosuchia ====
Genus	Species	Notes	Images
Cricosaurus	C. suevicus		
Dakosaurus	D. maximus		
"Steneosaurus"	S. sp		

==== Pterosauria ====
Genus	Species	Notes	Images
Ardeadactylus	A. longicollum	Originally described as a species of Pterodactylus	
Cycnorhamphus	C. suevicus		
Rhamphorhynchus	R. longiceps	Likely Junior Synonym of R. muensteri	
Rhamphorhynchus	R. muensteri		

== See also ==
- List of fossiliferous stratigraphic units in Germany
