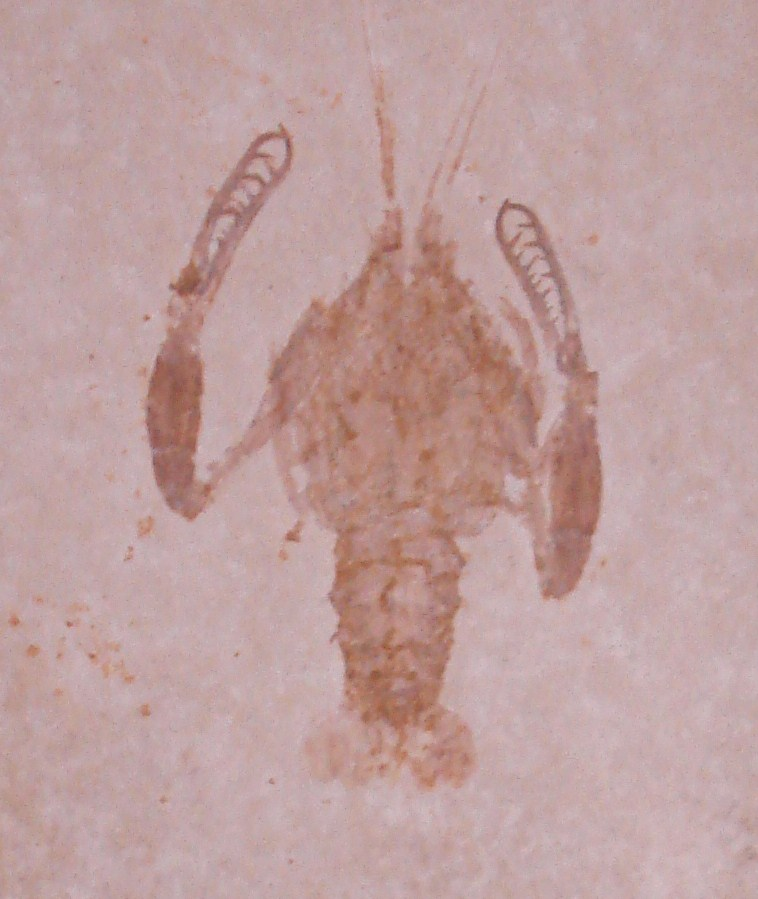
- Palaeopentacheles roettenbacheri

Scientific classification
- Kingdom: Animalia
- Phylum: Arthropoda
- Clade: Pancrustacea
- Class: Malacostraca
- Order: Decapoda
- Suborder: Pleocyemata
- Superfamily: Eryonoidea
- Family: †Palaeopentachelidae; Ahyong, 2009
- Genus: †Palaeopentacheles von Knebel, 1907
- Species: †P. roettenbacheri

Binomial name
- †Palaeopentacheles roettenbacheri (Münster, 1839)

Synonyms
- Eryon Röttenbacheri Münster, 1839

= Palaeopentacheles =

Palaeopentacheles Temporal range: Late Jurassic (Kimmeridgian-Tithonian), ~150 Ma

Genus of fossil polychelids

Palaeopentacheles is an extinct, monospecific genus of decapods in the monogeneric family Palaeopentachelidae that lived in what is now modern day Bavaria and Baden-Württemberg around 150 Ma. It is known from fossils discovered in the Nusplingen Limestone and Solnhofen Limestone formations.

== Classification history ==
The type species, P. roettenbacheri, was initially placed in the genus Eryon upon its 1839 description by Georg zu Münster. However, a 1907 study by Walther von Knebel would later move the species to its own genus, Palaeopentacheles.

In 1923, a second species, P. ovalis, was described by Victor van Straelen. However, in 1925, it was moved to its own genus, Willemoesiocaris, by the same author.

A third species from the Oligocene, P. starri, was described in 2001. Its assignment to the genus was tentative due to the poor condition its holotype was found in, and a later study revealed that the holotype was actually a moult, possibly from a nephropoid lobster.

Palaeopentacheles was previously placed in Polychelidae, but a 2009 study showed that it lay outside the Coleiidae + Polychelidae clade, so Palaeopentacheles was instead placed in the new family Palaeopentachelidae.
