= Homeryon =

Scientific classification
- Kingdom: Animalia
- Phylum: Arthropoda
- Class: Malacostraca
- Order: Decapoda
- Suborder: Pleocyemata
- Family: Polychelidae
- Genus: Homeryon; Galil, 2000

Species
- Homeryon armarium Galil, 2000; Homeryon asper (M. J. Rathbun, 1906)

Genus of crustaceans

Homeryon is a genus of blind, deep-sea crustaceans. It is named after the blind Greek poet Homer and the genus Eryon, which contains fossil relatives of the modern Polychelidae. It was separated from the genus Polycheles in 2001, and contains only two species.

== Homeryon armarium ==
Homeryon armarium is only known to occur on the Kyushu–Palau Ridge (the ocean ridge between Japan and Palau) at depths between 520 and 700 metres (1,710 and 2,300 ft). It is listed as Data Deficient on the IUCN Red List.

== Homeryon asper ==
Only a single specimen of Homeryon asper (formerly Polycheles asper) has ever been collected. This type specimen was a juvenile female, with a carapace 32 millimetres (1.3 in) long, dredged up by the USS Albatross at a depth of 1,323–1,577 metres (4,341–5,174 ft) off Niʻihau in 1902. It is now housed in the National Museum of Natural History of the Smithsonian Institution. H. asper is listed as Least Concern on the IUCN Red List.
