= Tetrachela =

Tetrachela Temporal range: Late Triassic

Scientific classification
- Kingdom: Animalia
- Phylum: Arthropoda
- Class: Malacostraca
- Order: Decapoda
- Suborder: Pleocyemata
- Superfamily: Eryonoidea
- Family: †Tetrachelidae; Beurlen, 1930
- Genus: †Tetrachela; Reuss, 1858
- Species: †T. raiblana

Binomial name
- †Tetrachela raiblana (Bronn, 1858)

Extinct genus of crustaceans

Tetrachela raiblana is an extinct species of polychelid crustacean from the Late Triassic. It is the only species in the family Tetrachelidae. It is distinguished from most other polychelids, including all the extant Polychelidae, by the retention of the diaeresis (divisions) of the uropodal exopods.
