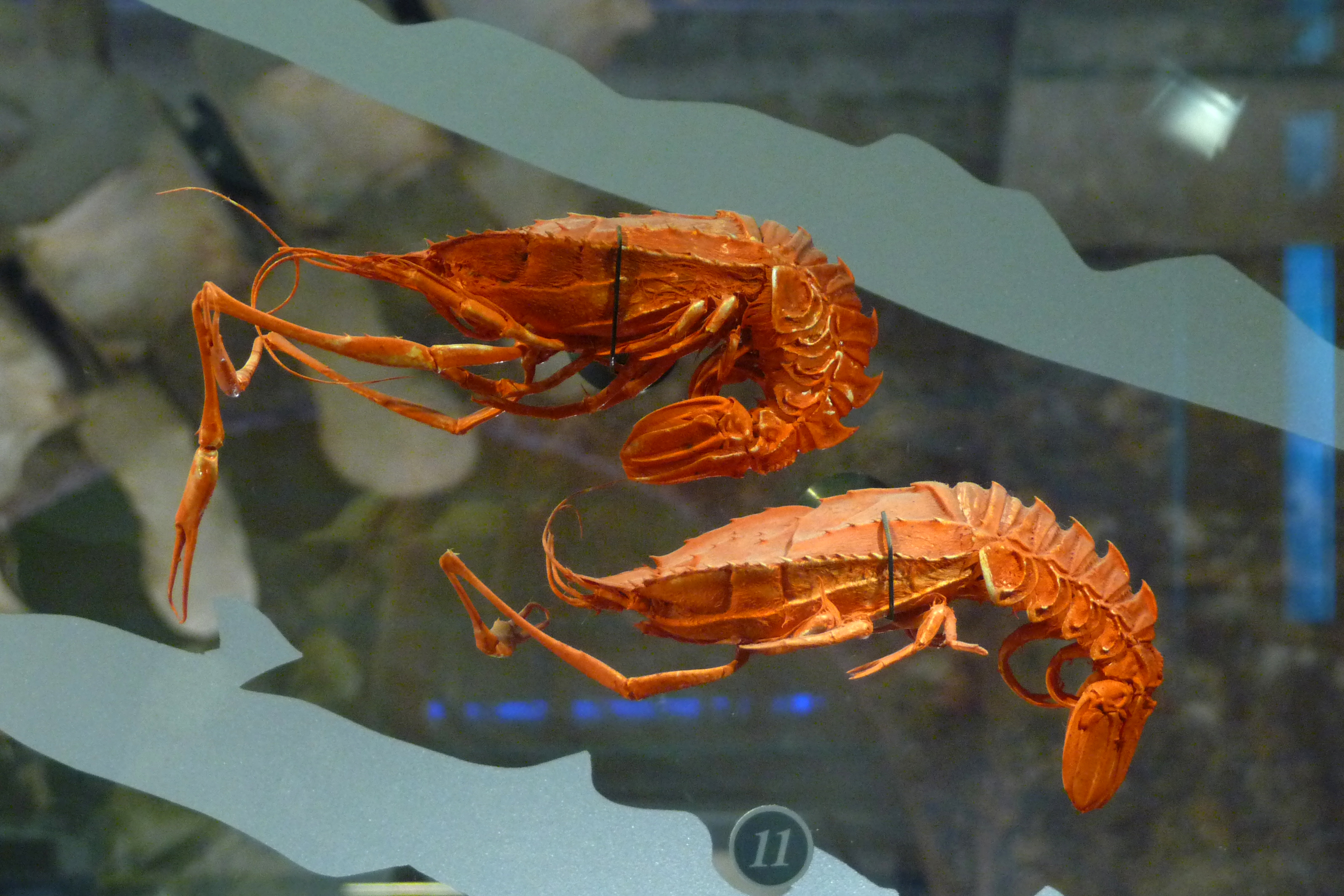
- Stereomastis sculpta

Scientific classification
- Kingdom: Animalia
- Phylum: Arthropoda
- Clade: Pancrustacea
- Class: Malacostraca
- Order: Decapoda
- Suborder: Pleocyemata
- Clade: Reptantia
- Infraorder: Polychelida; Scholtz & Richter, 1995

Families
- Coleiidae Van Straelen, 1925 †; Eryonidae De Haan, 1841 †; Palaeopentachelidae Ahyong, 2009 †; Polychelidae Wood-Mason, 1875; Tetrachelidae Beurlen, 1930 †

= Polychelida =

Polychelida Temporal range: Upper Triassic–Recent

Infraorder of crustaceans

Polychelida is an infraorder of decapod crustaceans. Fossil representatives are known dating from as far back as the Upper Triassic. A total of 38 extant species, all in the family Polychelidae, and 55 fossil species have been described.

== History ==
Polychelida had traditionally been included in the infraorder Palinura, alongside the spiny lobsters and slipper lobsters (now in the infraorder Achelata). In 1995, Gerhard Scholtz and Stefan Richter of the Freie Universität Berlin carried out a phylogenetic study of the "Reptantia", and concluded that "Palinura" was paraphyletic. They therefore abandoned that taxon and introduced instead the new clade Polychelida.

== Classification ==
Polychelida belongs to the group Reptantia, which consists of the walking/crawling decapods (lobsters and crabs). Polychelida is the sister clade to the infraorder Astacidea, which contains the "true" lobsters and crayfish. The cladogram below shows Polychelida's placement within the larger order Decapoda, from analysis by Wolfe et al., 2019.

- Decapoda
  - - Dendrobranchiata (prawns)
  - Pleocyemata
    - - Stenopodidea (boxer shrimp)
      - - Procarididea
        - Caridea ("true" shrimp)
    - Reptantia (crawling / walking decapods)
      - - Achelata (spiny lobsters and slipper lobsters)
        - - Polychelida (benthic crustaceans)
          - Glypheidea (glypheoid lobsters)
          - Astacidea (lobsters and crayfish)
      - - Axiidea (mud shrimp, ghost shrimp, and burrowing shrimp)
        - - Gebiidea (mud lobsters and mud shrimp)
          - - Anomura (hermit crabs and allies)
            - Brachyura ("true" crabs)

The animals grouped into the infraorder Polychelida are united by the presence of at least four pairs of chelae (claws). Five families are included, all but one of which are extinct. The 38 extant species are all in the family Polychelidae. The group has a fossil record stretching back to the Upper Triassic, and had its peak diversity in the Mesozoic. Although the extant species are all restricted to deep waters, the group is thought to have originated in shallow water. Over time, the eyes have reduced in size to the vestigial state seen in extant Polychelidae, the body has narrowed, and the chelae have become less robust; among extant taxa, the most plesiomorphic state is seen in Willemoesia.

Representatives of different families

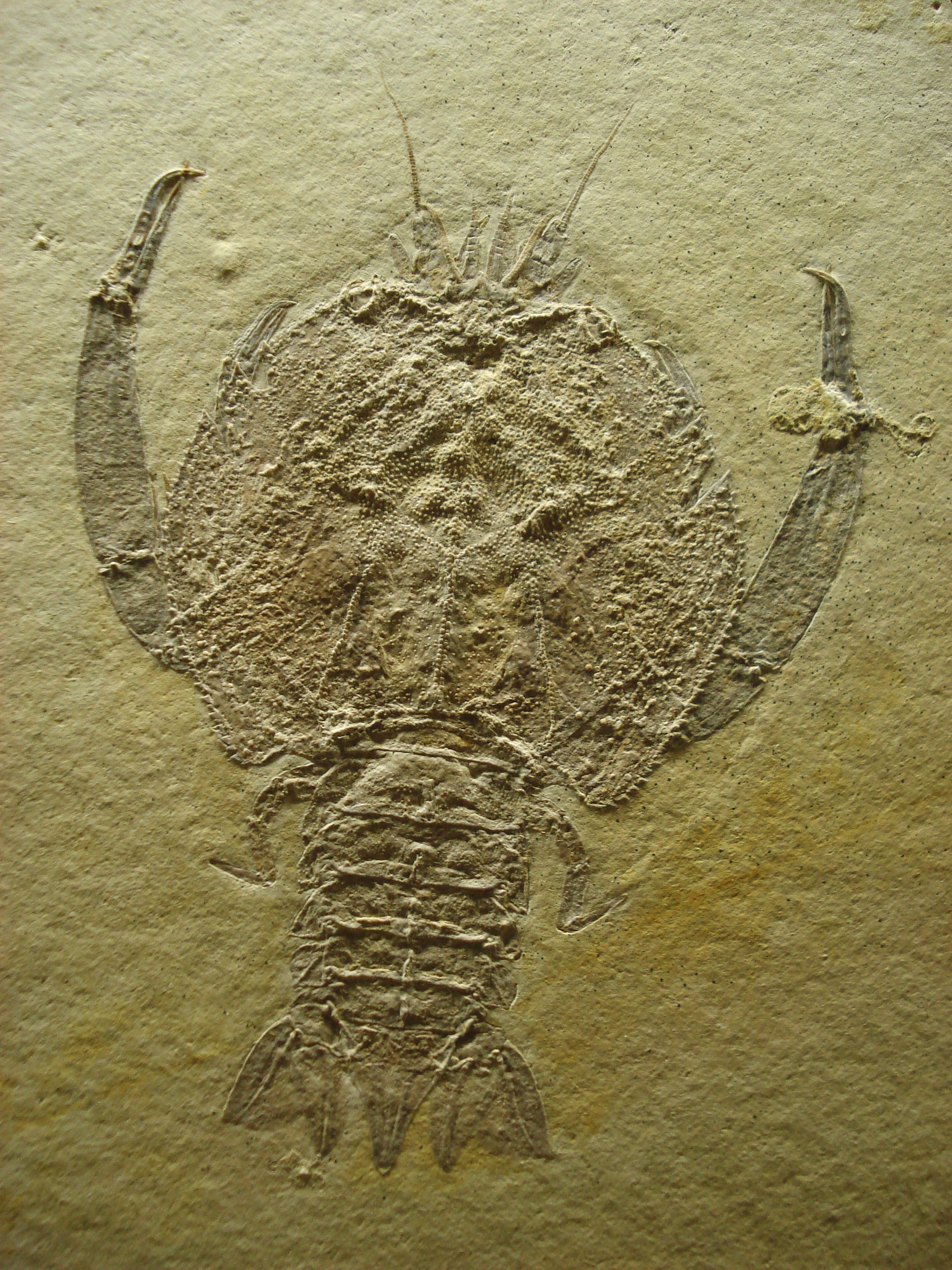
Cycleryon propinquus (Eryonidae)

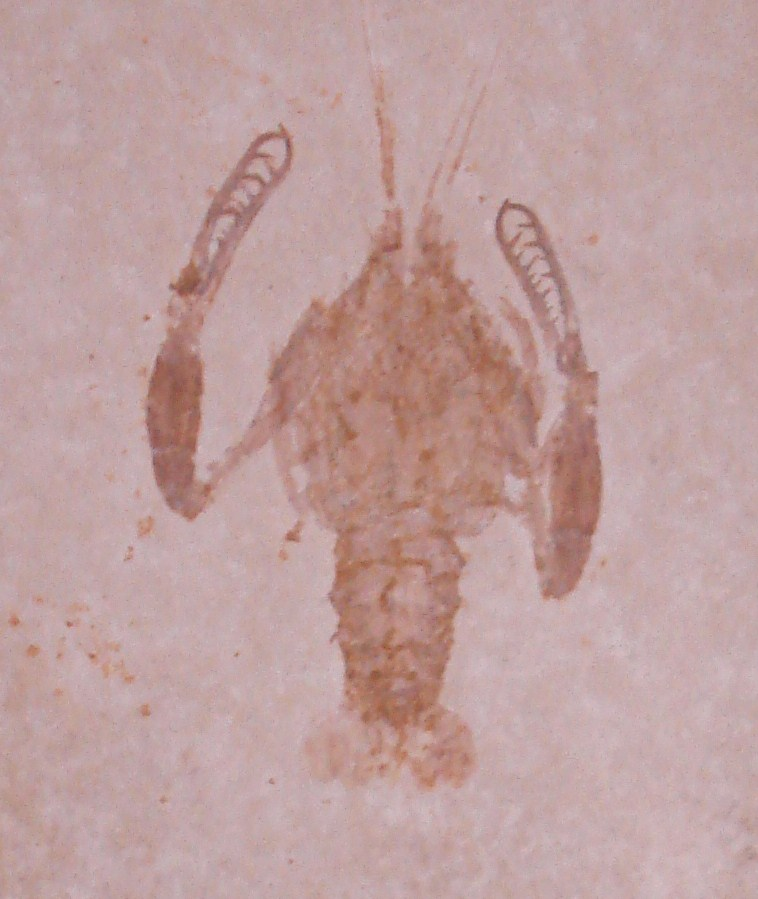
Palaeopentacheles roettenbacheri (Palaeopentachelidae)

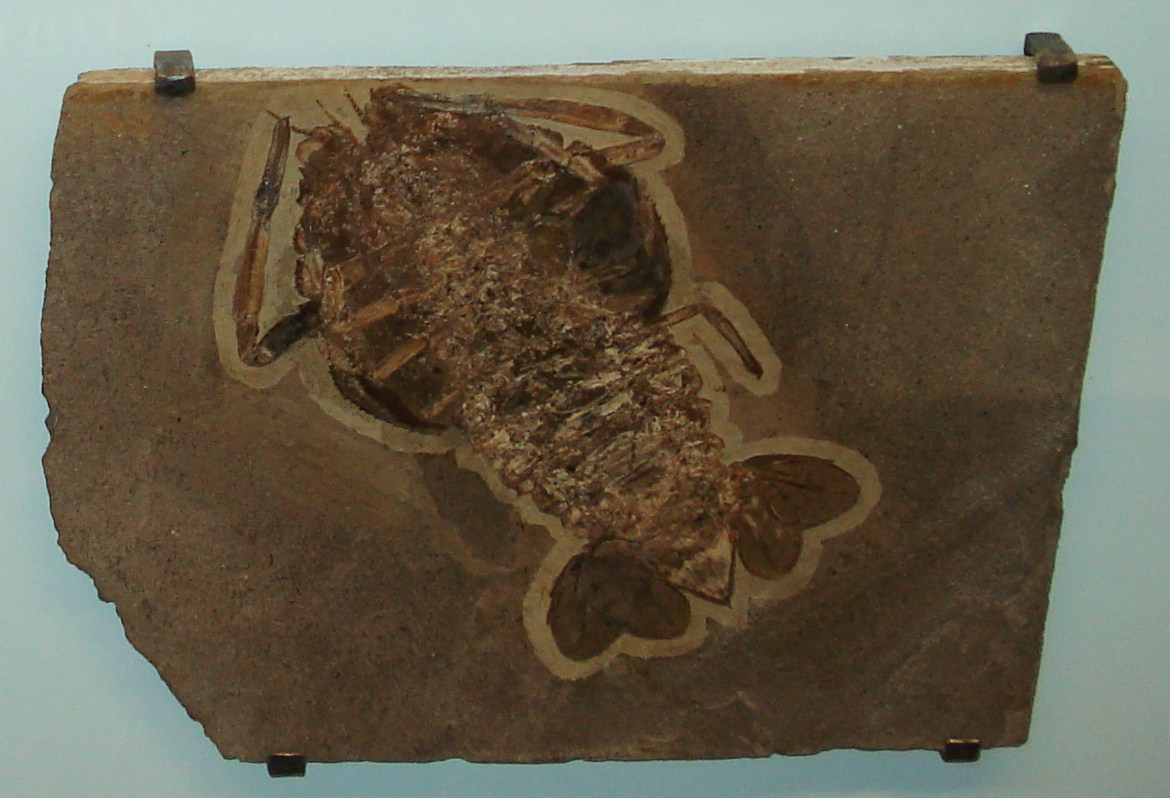
Proeryon hartmanni (Coleiidae)

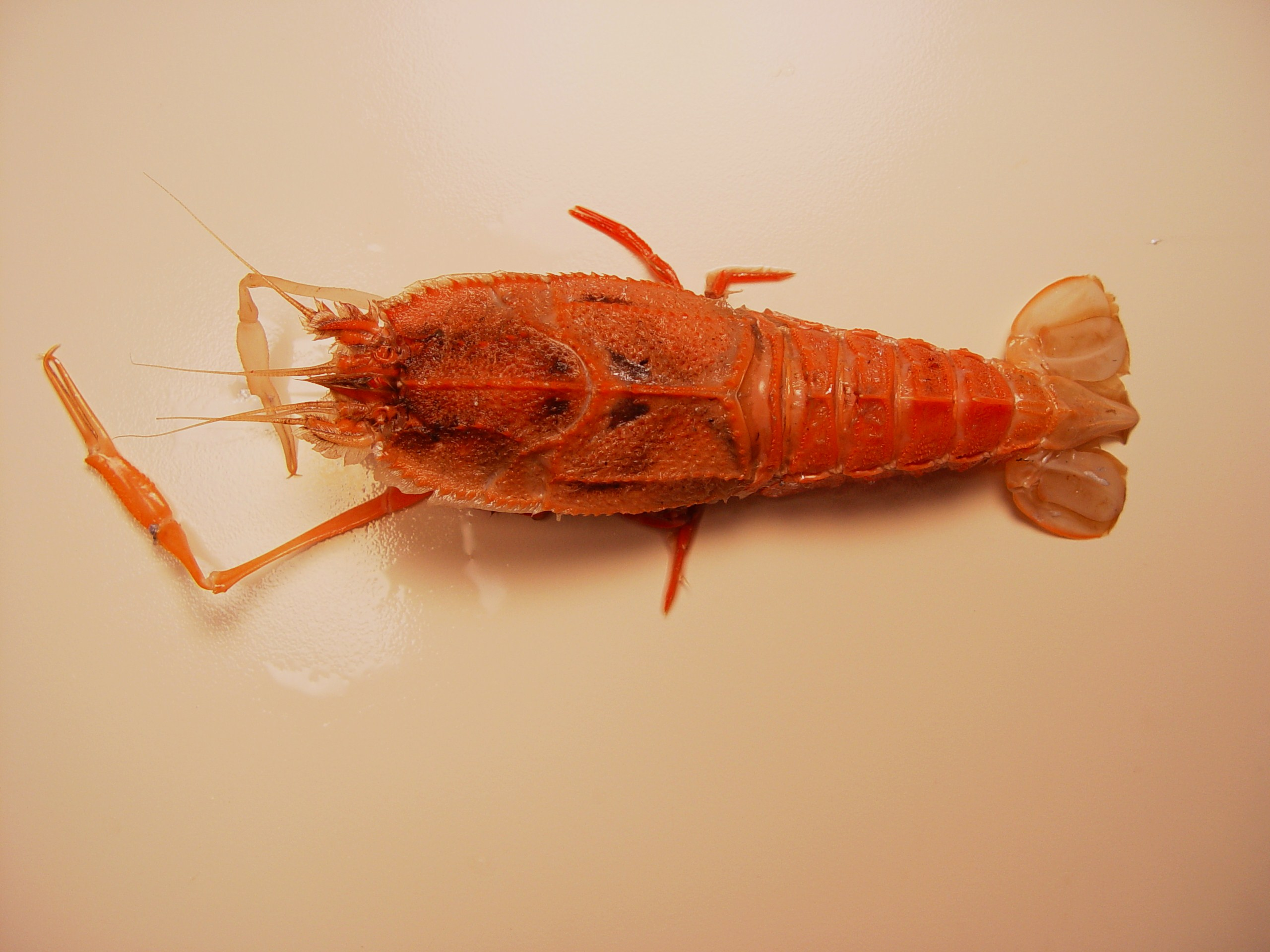
Stereomastis sculpta (Polychelidae)
