= Pentacheles gibbus =

Scientific classification
- Domain: Eukaryota
- Kingdom: Animalia
- Phylum: Arthropoda
- Class: Malacostraca
- Order: Decapoda
- Suborder: Pleocyemata
- Family: Polychelidae
- Genus: Pentacheles
- Species: P. gibbus

Binomial name
- Pentacheles gibbus Alcock, 1894

Species of crustacean

Pentacheles gibbus is a species of crustacean in the family Polychelidae.
