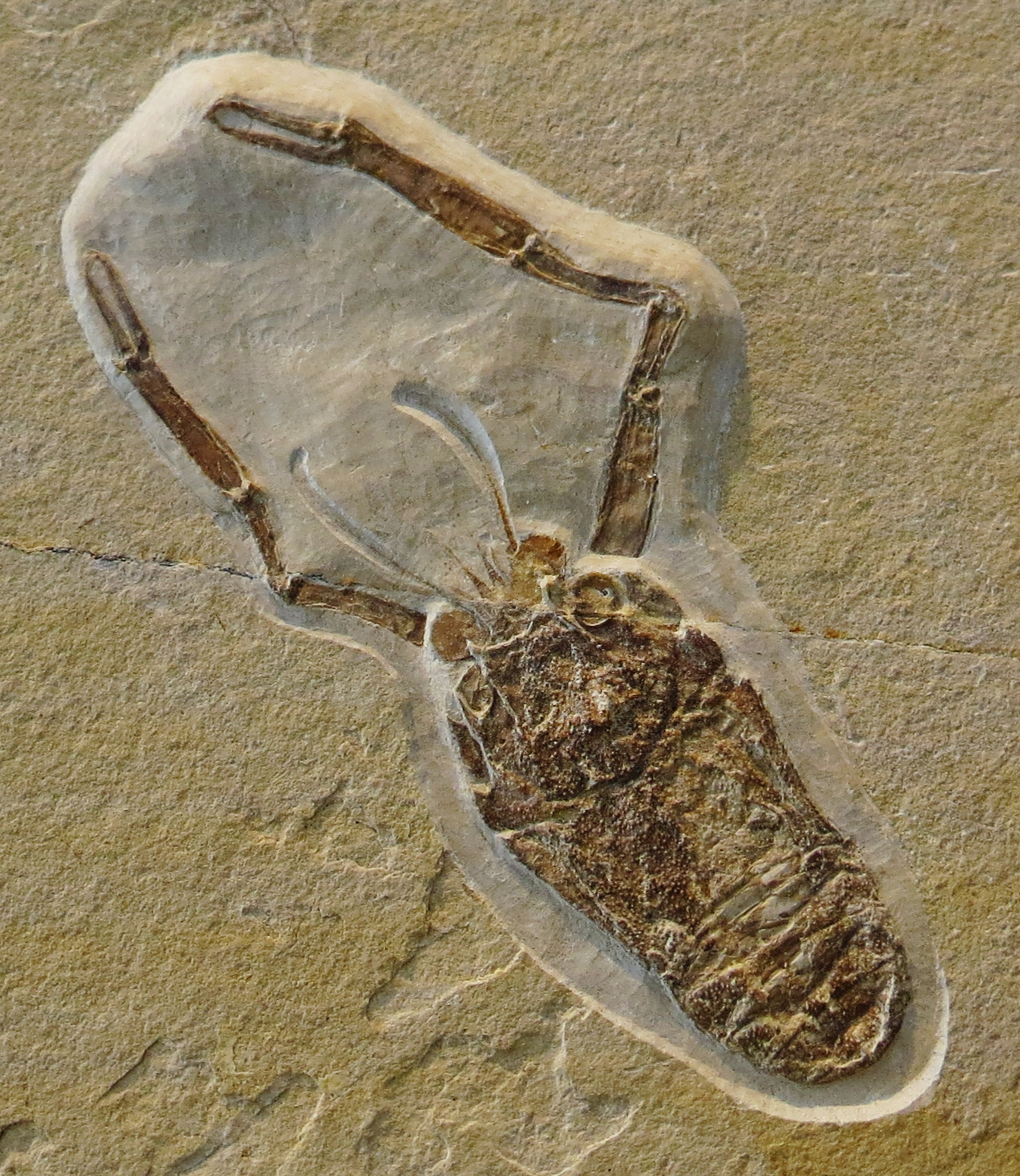
- Coleia longipes

Scientific classification
- Domain: Eukaryota
- Kingdom: Animalia
- Phylum: Arthropoda
- Class: Malacostraca
- Order: Decapoda
- Suborder: Pleocyemata
- Family: †Coleiidae
- Genus: †Coleia; Broderip, 1835

Type species
- Coleia antiqua Broderip, 1835

= Coleia =

Coleia Temporal range: Late Triassic–Late Jurassic

Extinct genus of crustaceans

Coleia is an extinct genus of decapods in the group Polychelida that lived from the Late Triassic to the Late Jurassic. It was described by Broderip in 1835, and the type species is C. antiqua. A new species, C. martinlutheri, which existed during the Sinemurian of what is now Germany, was described by Günter Schweigert and Werner Ernst in 2012.

== Species ==
- Coleia antiqua Broderip, 1835
- Coleia barrovensis McCoy, 1849
- Coleia boboi Garassino & Gironi, 2006
- Coleia bredonensis Woods, 1925
- Coleia brodiei Woodward, 1866
- Coleia crassichelis Woodward, 1866
- Coleia edwardsi Moriere, 1864
- Coleia gigantea (Van Straelen, 1923)
- Coleia incerta Secretan, 1964
- Coleia longipes Fraas, 1855
- Coleia martinlutheri Schweigert & Ernst, 2012
- Coleia mediterranea Pinna, 1968
- Coleia moorei Woodward, 1866
- Coleia morierei Renault, 1889
- Coleia pinnai Teruzzi, 1990
- Coleia popeyei Teruzzi, 1990
- Coleia sibirica Chernyschev, 1930
- Coleia sinuata Beurlen, 1928
- Coleia tenuichelis Woods, 1925
- Coleia theodorii Kuhn, 1952
- Coleia uzume Karasawa, 2003
- Coleia viallii Pinna, 1968
- Coleia wilmcotensis Woodward, 1866
