= Stereomastis suhmi =

Scientific classification
- Kingdom: Animalia
- Phylum: Arthropoda
- Clade: Pancrustacea
- Class: Malacostraca
- Order: Decapoda
- Suborder: Pleocyemata
- Family: Polychelidae
- Genus: Stereomastis
- Species: S. suhmi

Binomial name
- Stereomastis suhmi Bate, 1878

Species of crustacean

Stereomastis suhmi, the blind lobster, is a species of crustacean resembling a prawn or a squat lobster. It was first described by Charles Spence Bate in 1878.

It was first found off the coast of Tasmania, 95 km northeast of Flinders Island.

The Polychelidae family was the most diverse during the Mesozoic period, and the Stereomastis suhmi has geographical ranges that go from West Indies, the Caribbean Sea, Sargasso Sea, West Africa, Eastern Australia, and Taiwan (Rengaiyan et al., 2020b). These creatures likely live in low-salinity/oxygen-rich waters (Nahuel Emiliano Farías et al. (2015)).
