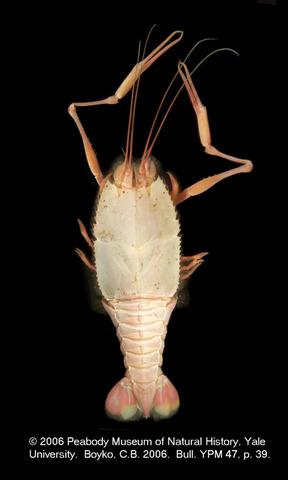

Scientific classification
- Domain: Eukaryota
- Kingdom: Animalia
- Phylum: Arthropoda
- Class: Malacostraca
- Order: Decapoda
- Suborder: Pleocyemata
- Family: Polychelidae
- Genus: Pentacheles
- Species: P. laevis

Binomial name
- Pentacheles laevis Bate, 1878

= Pentacheles laevis =

Species of crustacean

Pentacheles laevis, also known as the smooth blind decapod, is a species of crustacean in the family Polychelidae.
