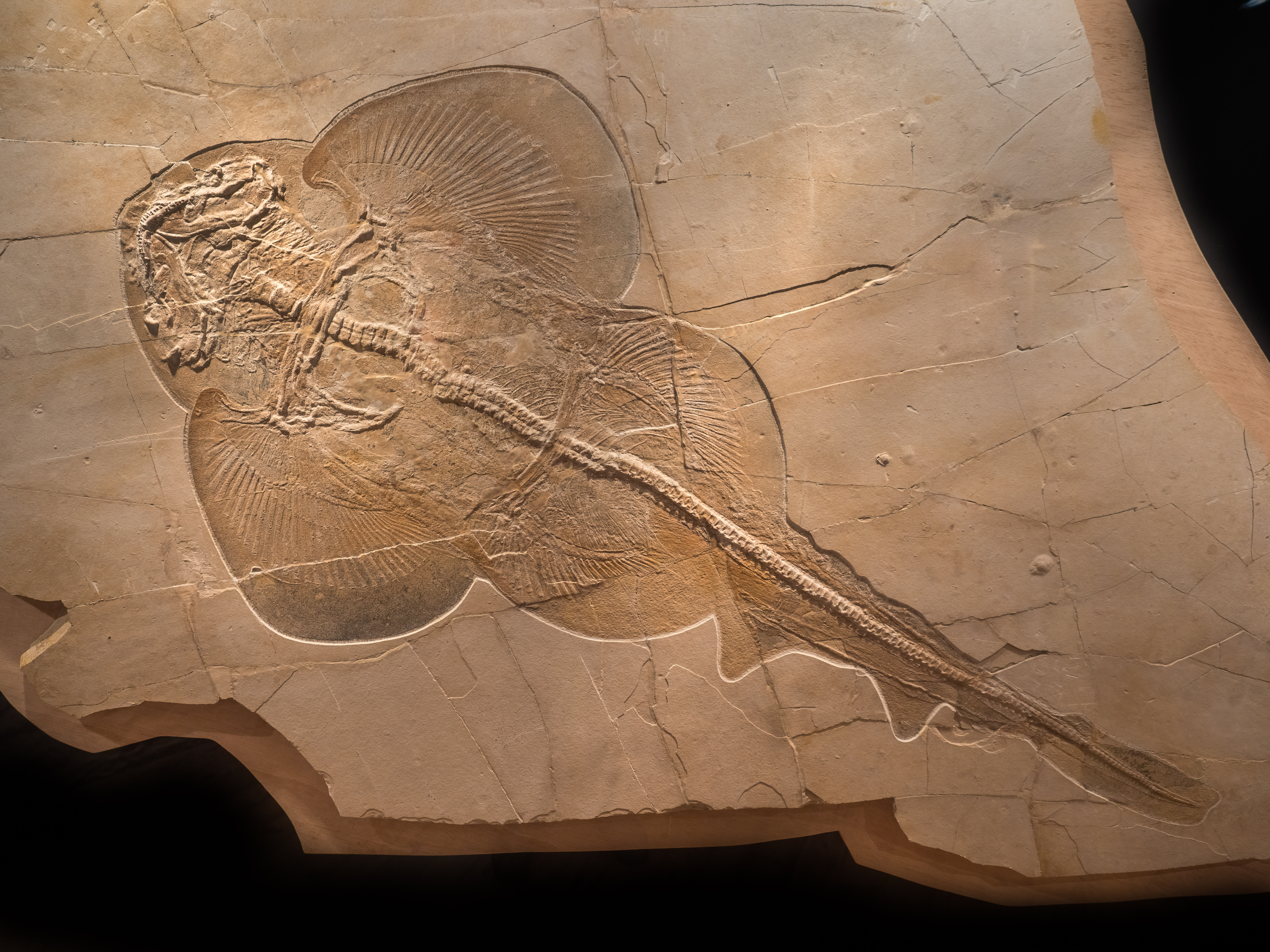
- Fossil impression of Pseudorhina

Scientific classification
- Kingdom: Animalia
- Phylum: Chordata
- Class: Chondrichthyes
- Subclass: Elasmobranchii
- Division: Selachii
- Order: Squatiniformes
- Family: †Pseudorhinidae; Klug and Kriwet, 2012
- Genus: †Pseudorhina; Jaekel, 1898

Species
- † Pseudorhina acanthoderma; † Pseudorhina alifera; † Pseudorhina frequens; † Pseudorhina crocheti

= Pseudorhina =

Pseudorhina Temporal range: Oxfordian-Valanginian

Extinct genus of sharks

Pseudorhina is an extinct genus of squatiniform shark closely related to modern angelsharks. Fossils are known from the Late Jurassic and Early Cretaceous of Europe.

== Taxonomy and relationships ==
Angel shark phylogeny

- Squatiniformes
  - Pseudorhinidae
    Pseudorhina
  - Squatinidae
    - Cretasquatina
    - - Squatina
      - Cretascyllium

Relationships based on Maisley et al., 2020.

Pseudorhina is currently the oldest known angel shark genus. It is thought to represent the earliest diverging group in the Squatiniformes and has been placed in a monotypic family called Pseudorhinidae. While most fossil genera and species of angel shark are represented solely by isolated teeth, Pseudorhina is relatively well known from articulated individuals. This allows for detailed comparisons with other genera known from articulated remains including the extant Squatina.

== Description ==
Like all other members of Squatiniformes, Pseudorhina has a flattened body with large pectoral and pelvic fins. Pseudorhina differs from living Squatina in numerous morphological characters, including "antero-posterior length of the first basiventral is equal to that of the second, the postorbital process is directed laterally, the orbital process is nearly vertical, and the anterior spool of the first vertebra centrum is not reduced" with the teeth of Pseudorhina having "broader triangular cusps and very oblique and short heels, with a broad apron united to the basal labial margin of the crown". The species Pseudorhina acanthoderma and Pseudorhina alifera from the Late Jurassic of Europe, which are known from full body remains, are distinguished from each other by having a different body sizes, proportions, as well as differences in tooth anatomy, with the differences in skeletal anatomy between the two species being largely indisinguishable.

== Distribution and temporal range ==
All Late Jurassic squatiniform shark teeth currently known are attributed to Pseudorhina. The genus is currently restricted to Europe. Pseudorhina frequens is known from isolated teeth found in the Late Jurassic Kimmeridge Clay of England. The fully body species P. acanthoderma and P. alifera are known from the Late Jurassic Solnhofen Plattenkalk limestones of southern Germany. P. acanthoderma is known from the late Kimmeridgian in layers which produce ammonites such as Hybonoticeras beckeri and Lithacoceras ulmense. It is known from both isolated teeth and associated material. P. alifera is known from the early Tithonian and similar teeth currently labeled as P. aff. alifera have been described from the Valanginian of France. Associated specimens are known. There seems to be another undescribed species with a unique tooth morphology from the Tithonian of Germany. P. crocheti is known from more than 250 isolated teeth from the Valanginian of France.

== Gallery ==
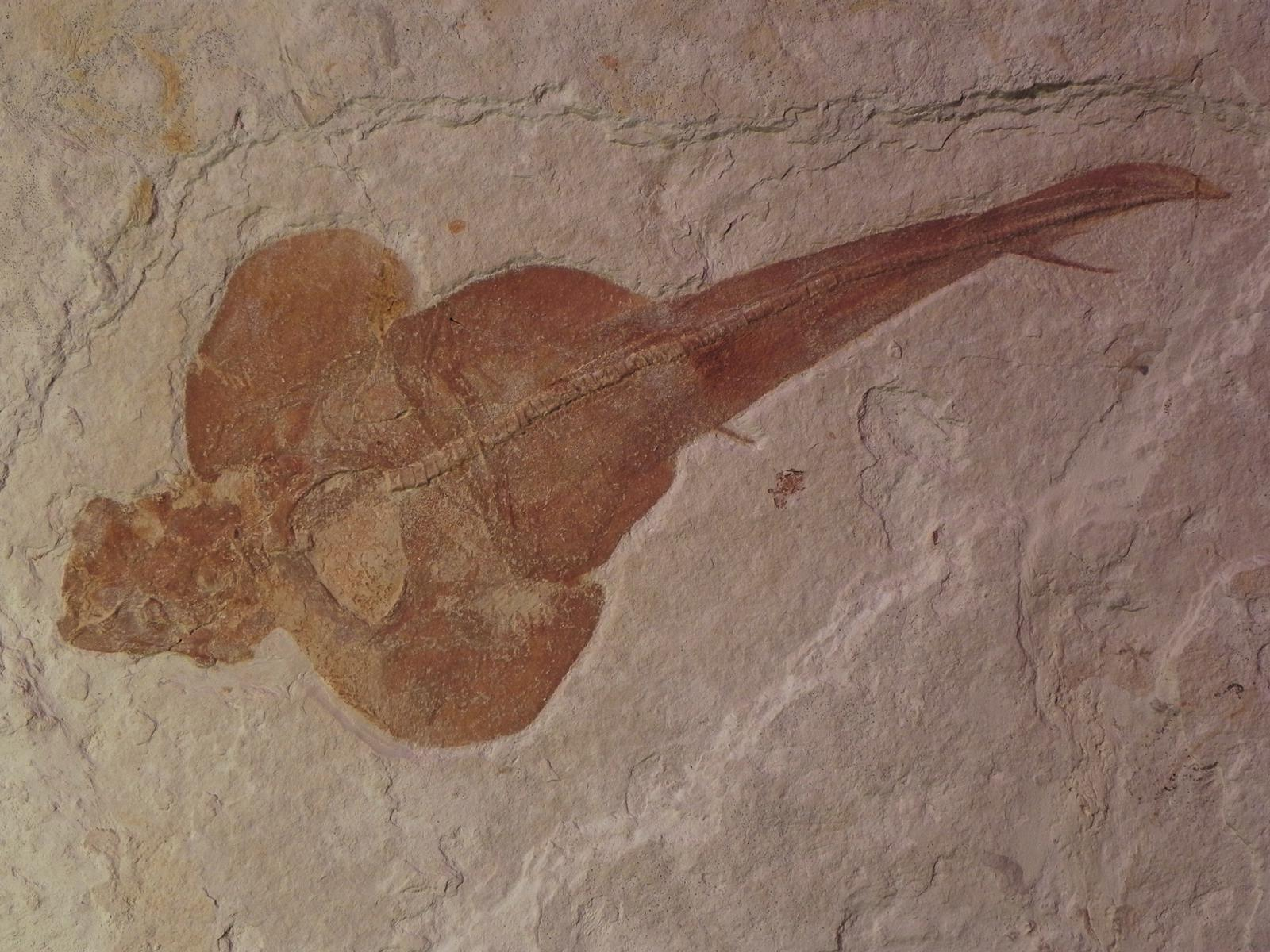
Pseudorhina alifera from the Kimmeridgian of Germany

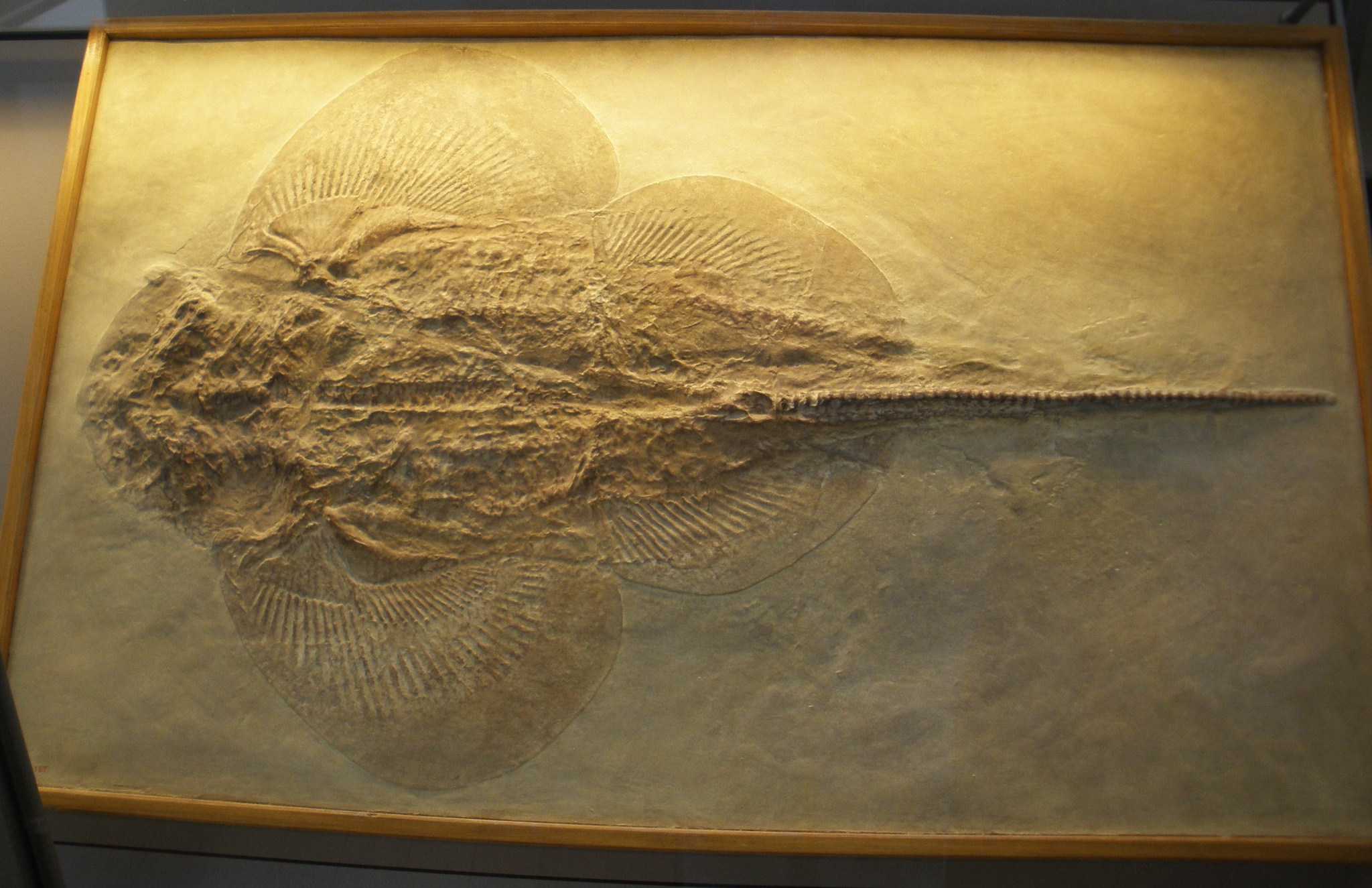
Pseudorhina alifera

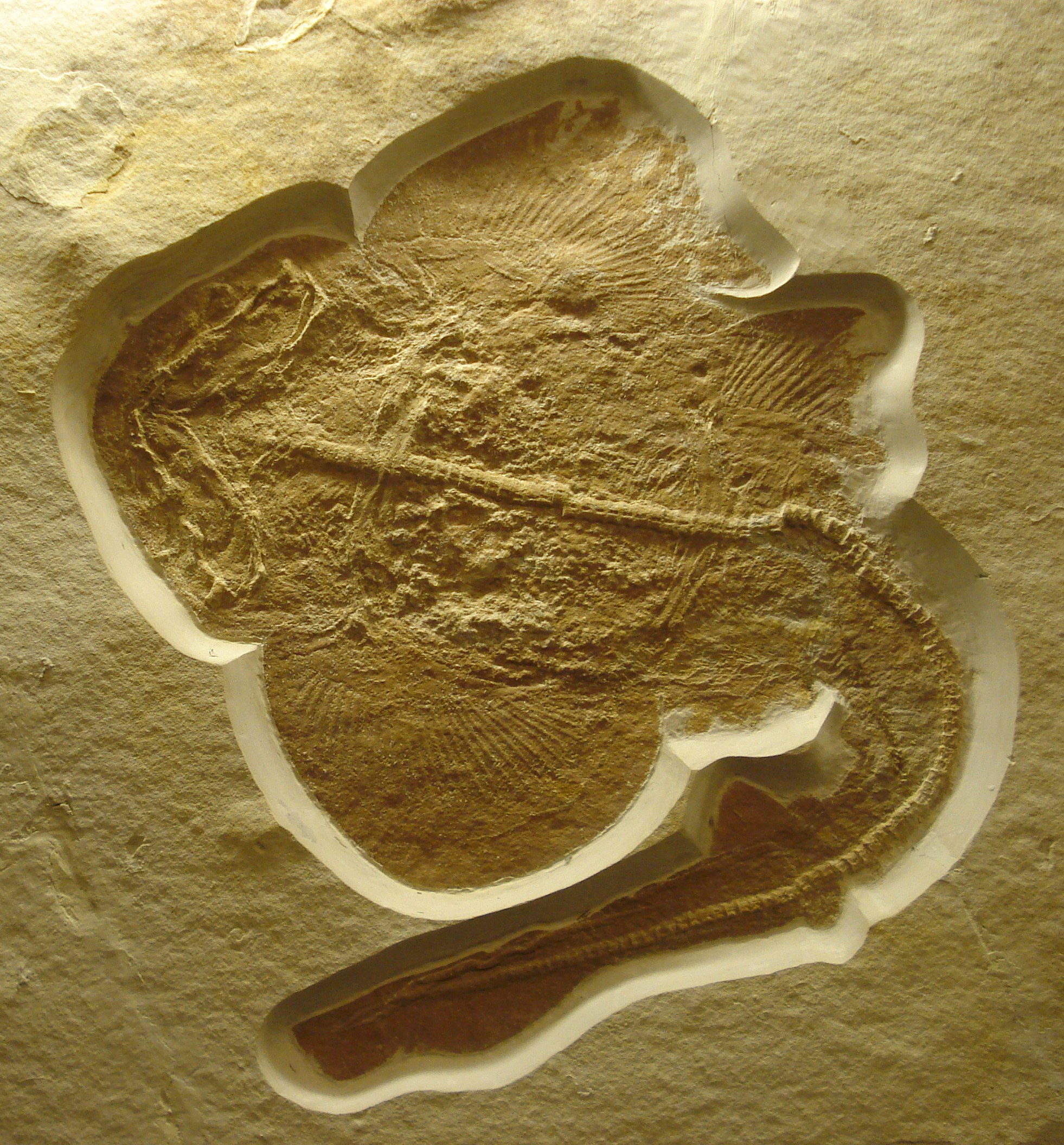
Pseudorhina

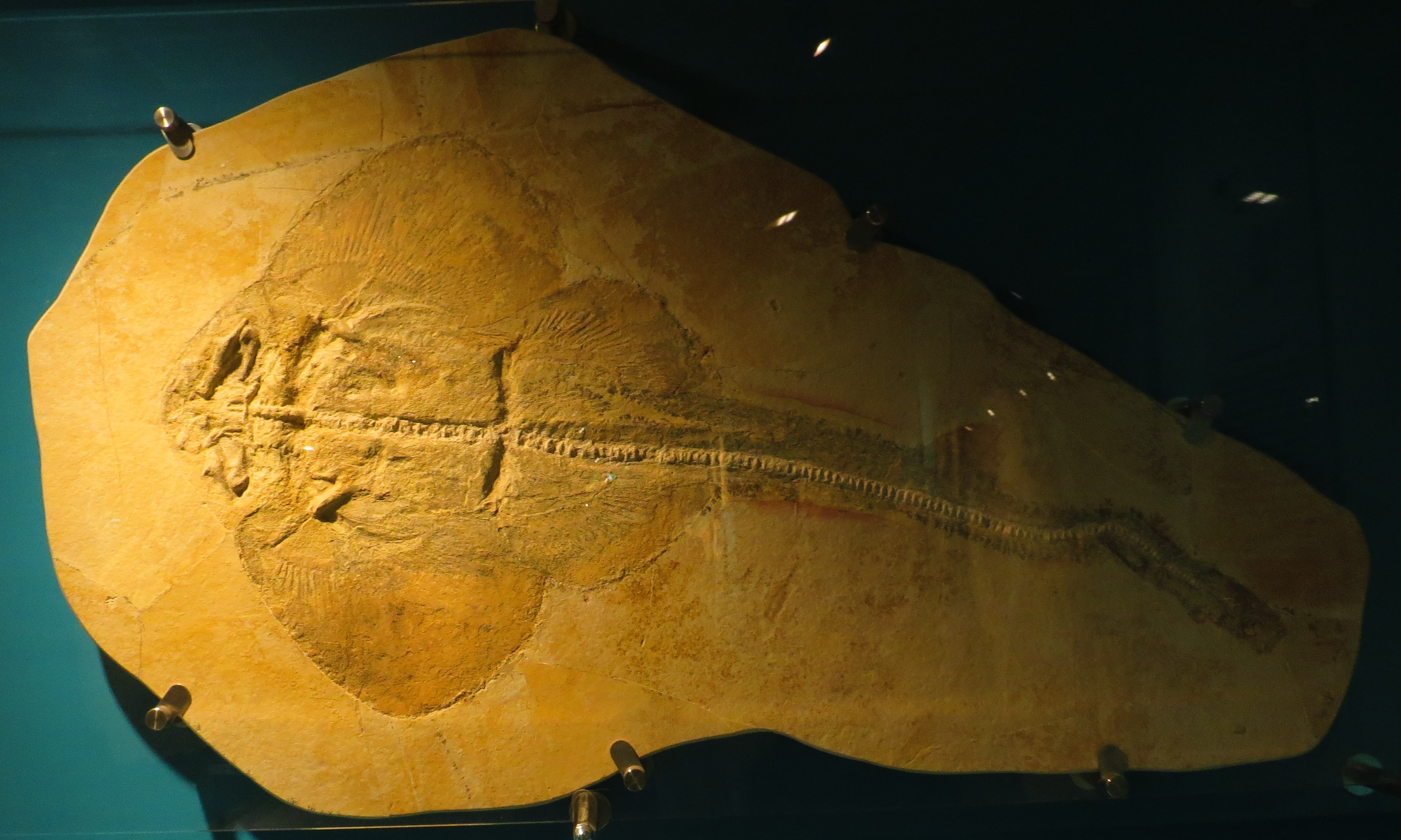
Pseudorhina alifera

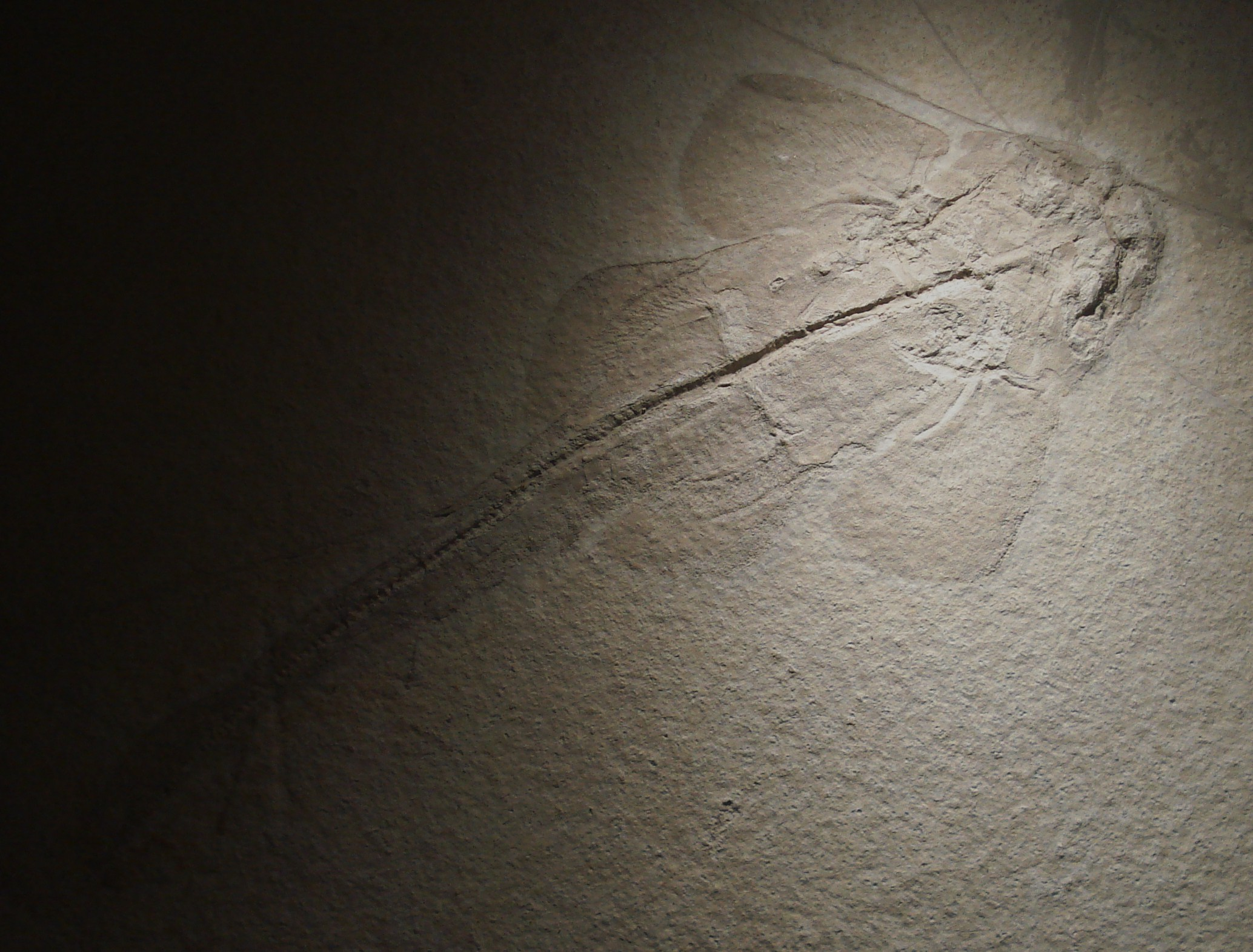
Pseudorhina asterodermus

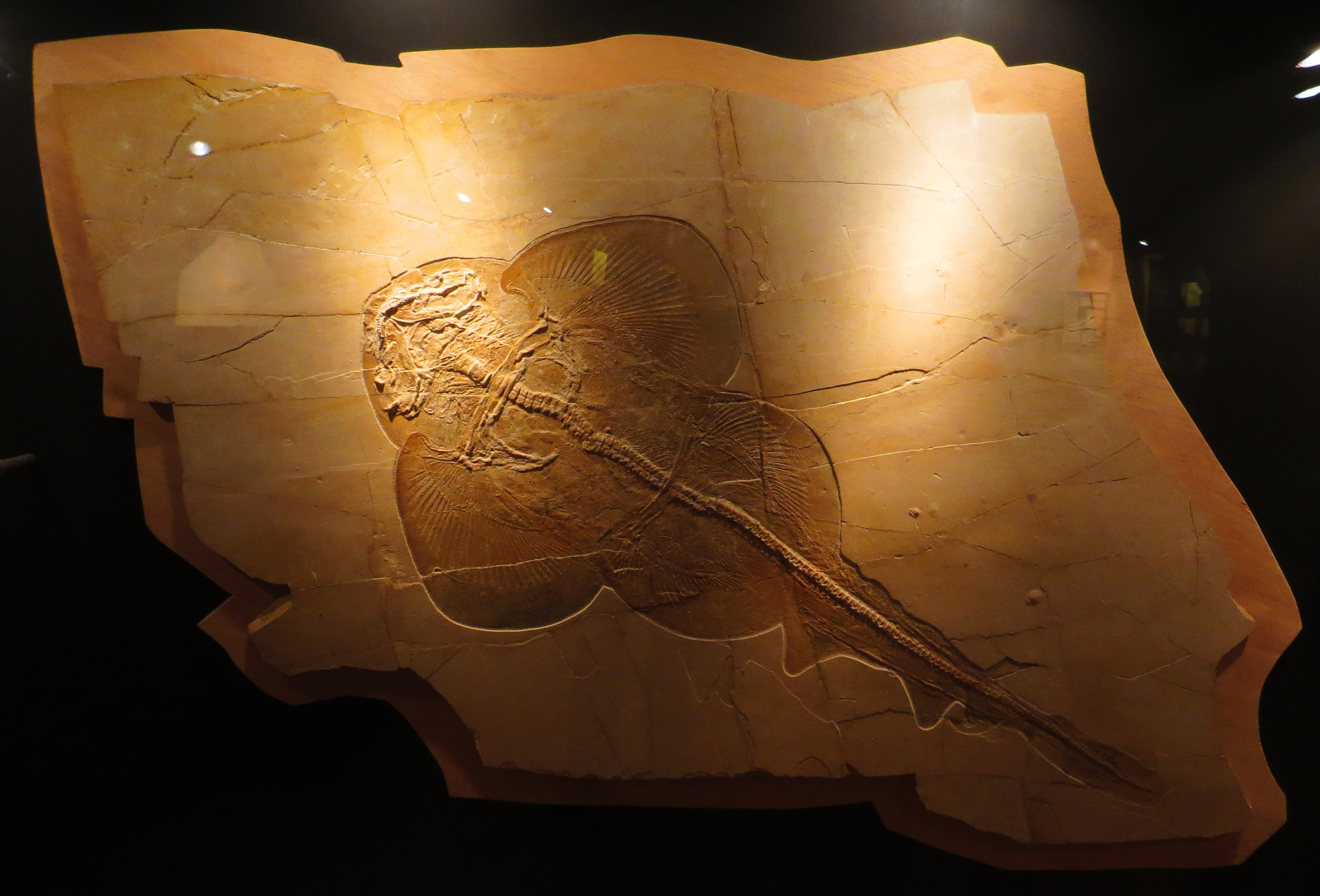
Pseudorhina sp.
