= Eogeophilus =

Eogeophilus jurassicus Temporal range: Kimmeridgian ~155.7–150.8 Ma

Scientific classification
- Domain: Eukaryota
- Kingdom: Animalia
- Phylum: Arthropoda
- Subphylum: Myriapoda
- Class: Chilopoda
- Order: Geophilomorpha
- Family: Geophilidae
- Genus: †Eogeophilus; Schweigert & Dietl, 1997
- Species: †E. jurassicus

Binomial name
- †Eogeophilus jurassicus Schweigert & Dietl, 1997

Extinct genus of centipedes

Eogeophilus ("dawn earth lover") is an extinct genus of geophilid centipede that was discovered in the Nusplingen Limestone of Germany. It is a monotypic genus, with only type species Eogeophilus jurassicus known.

== Etymology ==
The genus was named for its close relationship and similarities to the extant Geophilus. The specific epithet is derived from the Jurassic, which in turn is named after the Jura Mountain Range.
