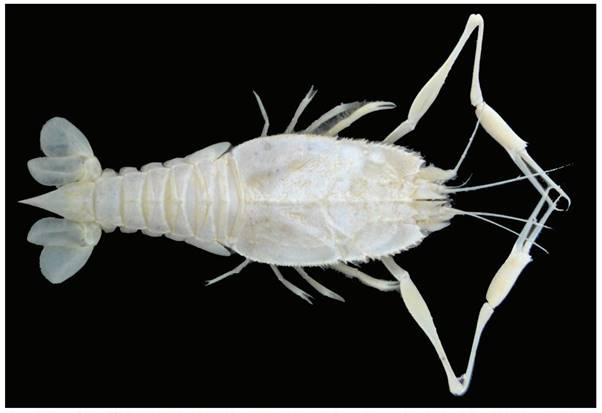

Scientific classification
- Domain: Eukaryota
- Kingdom: Animalia
- Phylum: Arthropoda
- Class: Malacostraca
- Order: Decapoda
- Suborder: Pleocyemata
- Family: Polychelidae
- Genus: Pentacheles
- Species: P. validus

Binomial name
- Pentacheles validus A. Milne-Edwards, 1880

= Pentacheles validus =

Species of decapod

Pentacheles validus is a species of decapod in the family Polychelidae. They can grow up to 77 millimetres (3.0 in). They rely on drag powered swimming to mobilize through the ocean.
