= Cardus crucifer =

Conservation status
- Least Concern (IUCN 3.1)

Scientific classification
- Kingdom: Animalia
- Phylum: Arthropoda
- Class: Malacostraca
- Order: Decapoda
- Suborder: Pleocyemata
- Family: Polychelidae
- Genus: Cardus; Galil, 2000
- Species: C. crucifer

Binomial name
- Cardus crucifer (Thomson, 1873)

Synonyms
- Deidamia crucifer Thomson, 1873 (basionym); Polycheles crucifer (Thomson, 1873)

Species of crustacean

Cardus crucifer is a species of blind deep-water decapod crustacean from the Atlantic Ocean, the only species in the genus Cardus. It differs from other members of the family Polychelidae in having only four pairs of claws, instead of five, in both sexes. The name Cardus refers to the thistle Carduus, in reference to the spiny thistle-like carapace. It is found in the eastern Atlantic from Portugal to Morocco and around the Azores and Canary Islands, and in the Bahamas, the Caribbean Sea and the Gulf of Mexico, at depths of 550–2,200 metres (1,800–7,220 ft).
