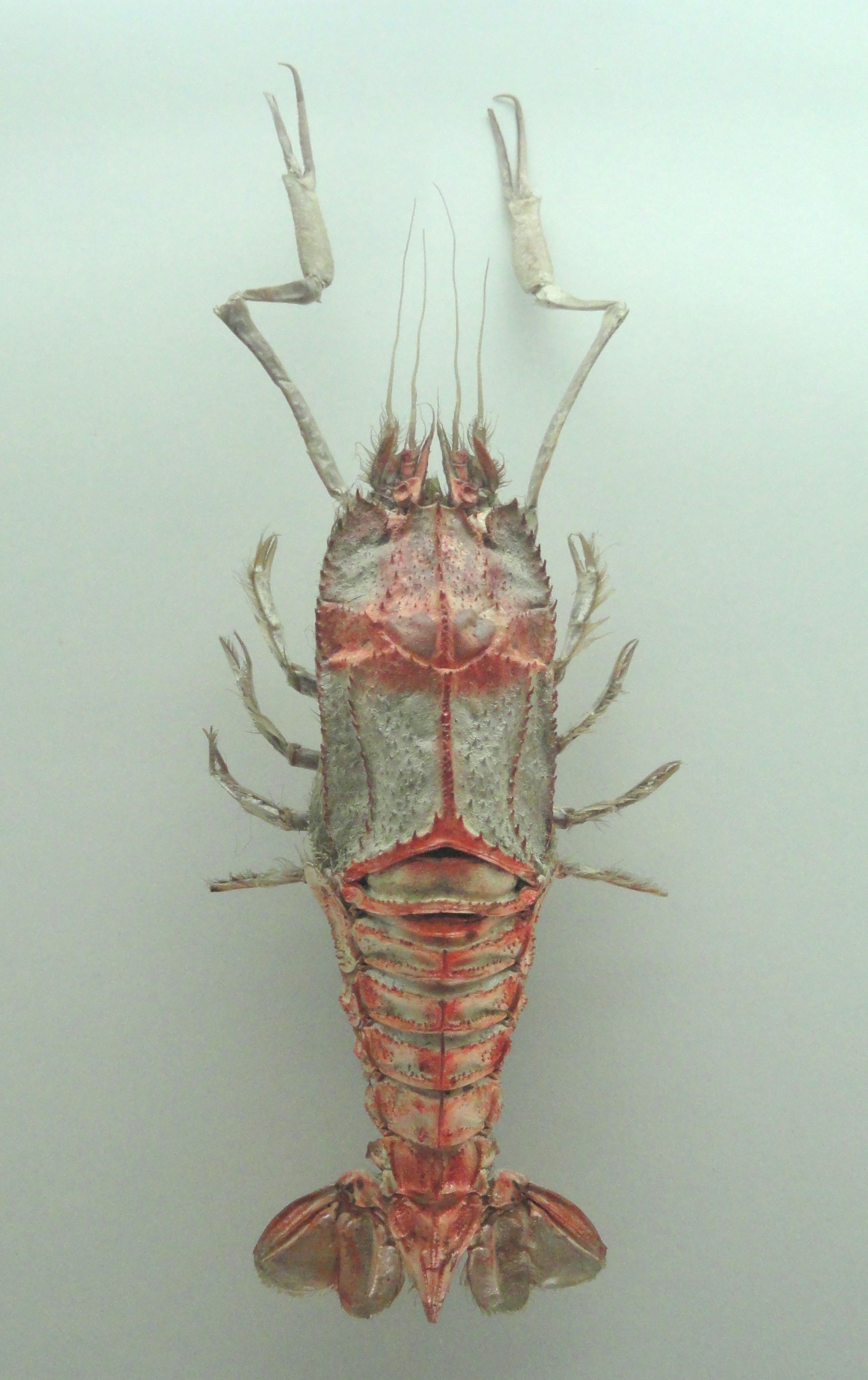

Conservation status
- Least Concern (IUCN 3.1)

Scientific classification
- Kingdom: Animalia
- Phylum: Arthropoda
- Clade: Pancrustacea
- Class: Malacostraca
- Order: Decapoda
- Suborder: Pleocyemata
- Family: Polychelidae
- Genus: Polycheles
- Species: P. typhlops

Binomial name
- Polycheles typhlops C. Heller, 1862

Synonyms
- Pentacheles agassizii A. Milne-Edwards, 1880; Polycheles doderleini Riggio, 1885; Pentacheles hextii Alcock, 1894; Polycheles intermedius Balss, 1914

= Polycheles typhlops =

Species of crustacean

Polycheles typhlops is a species of blind, deep water decapod crustacean with a cosmopolitan distribution. It is "one of the dominant and most characteristic crustaceans in deep-sea communities of the Mediterranean Sea".

== Description ==
Adult P. typhlops reach a total length of 50–100 millimetres (2.0–3.9 in), from the tip of the rostrum to the end of the telson. This excludes the greatly elongated first pair of pereiopods which are normally held with the first three segments close to the side of the thorax, and the remainder held horizontal above the level of the animal's body, with the tips of the claws not exceeding the tip of the rostrum. This is thought to be an adaptation to predation while partly buried in the sediment. The usual colour of the exoskeleton is whitish, orange or yellow, with the fertilised eggs matching the colour of the pleon where they are brooded.

As in other polychelids, and as implied by the generic names Polycheles and Pentacheles, all five pairs of pereiopods bear claws.

Polycheles typhlops may be distinguished from closely related species by a number of characteristics, including the presence of an indentation around the orbit of the eye, 12–15 spines on each side of the carapace, a forward-pointing spine on the back of each of the second to fifth segments of the pleon, and two longitudinal ridges on each uropod. Only one other polychelid species is known to occur in the Mediterranean Sea, although four different species of larva have been found there.

== Distribution ==
Polycheles typhlops lives in deep water throughout the Indo-Pacific, and on both sides of the Atlantic Ocean, including the Mediterranean Sea, the type specimen having been caught off Sicily.

The species' depth distribution is less clear, with different authors citing depths of 350–900 metres (1,150–2,950 ft), 300–2,000 metres (980–6,560 ft), 450–2,000 metres (1,480–6,560 ft), 77–2,055 metres (253–6,742 ft), and 600–1,400 metres (2,000–4,600 ft). It is reported to be most abundant at depths of 750 metres (2,460 ft), 500–1,000 metres (1,600–3,300 ft), or 900–1,300 metres (3,000–4,300 ft). There are known to be both seasonal and geographical variations in depth, which may help to explain the variation.

== Ecology ==
P. typhlops probably acts as an ambush predator, hiding buried in the sediment with its claws raised above the surface. Its main prey are bony fish and other crustaceans, such as shrimp, mysids and amphipods.
