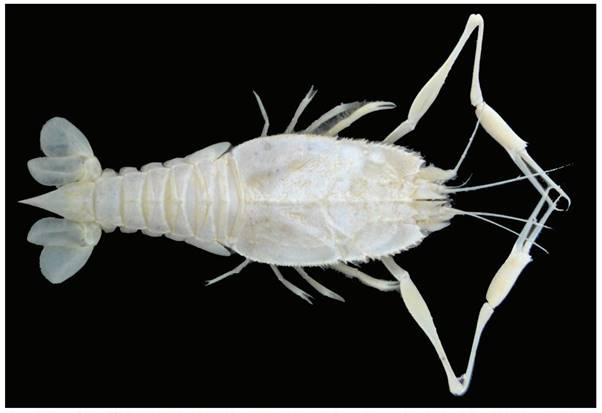
- Pentacheles validus

Scientific classification
- Domain: Eukaryota
- Kingdom: Animalia
- Phylum: Arthropoda
- Class: Malacostraca
- Order: Decapoda
- Suborder: Pleocyemata
- Family: Polychelidae
- Genus: Pentacheles; Spence Bate, 1878

= Pentacheles =

Genus of crustaceans

Pentacheles is a genus of crustaceans of the class Malacostraca.

== Species ==
- Pentacheles gibbus Alcock, 1894
- Pentacheles laevis Bate, 1878
- Pentacheles obscurus Bate, 1878
- Pentacheles snyderi (Rathbun, 1906)
- Pentacheles validus A. Milne-Edwards, 1880
