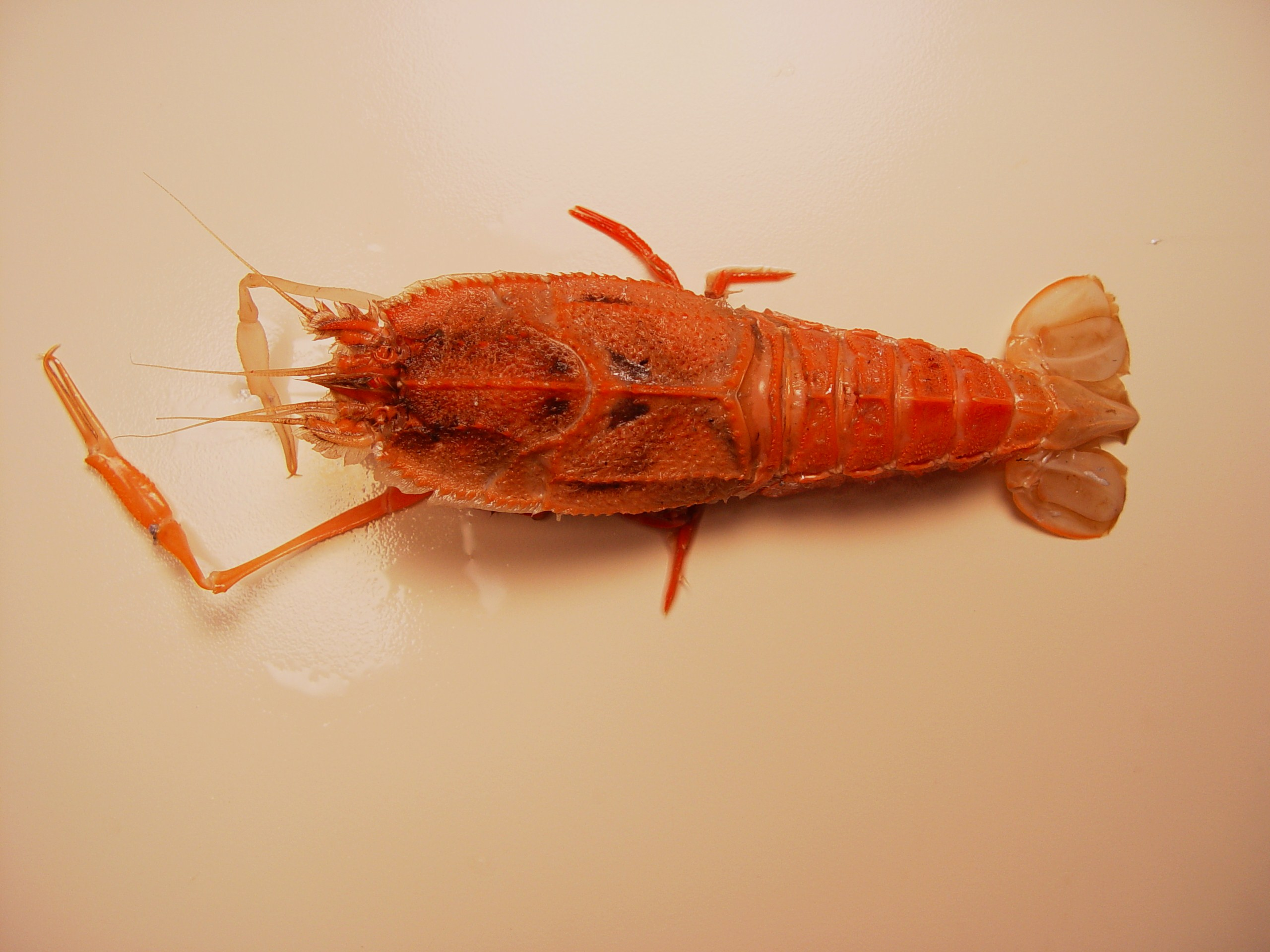

Conservation status
- Least Concern (IUCN 3.1)

Scientific classification
- Kingdom: Animalia
- Phylum: Arthropoda
- Class: Malacostraca
- Order: Decapoda
- Suborder: Pleocyemata
- Family: Polychelidae
- Genus: Stereomastis
- Species: S. sculpta

Binomial name
- Stereomastis sculpta (S. I. Smith, 1880)

Synonyms
- Polycheles sculptus Smith, 1880; Pentacheles spinosus A. Milne-Edwards, 1880; Pentacheles sculptus Smith, 1882

= Stereomastis sculpta =

Species of crustacean

Stereomastis sculpta is a species of "strange, blind crustacean" resembling a prawn or a squat lobster. It has a cosmopolitan distribution in deep water, being found on both sides of the Atlantic Ocean, in the Mediterranean Sea, and across much of the Indo-West Pacific, at depths of 200–4,000 metres (660–13,120 ft).

== Gallery ==
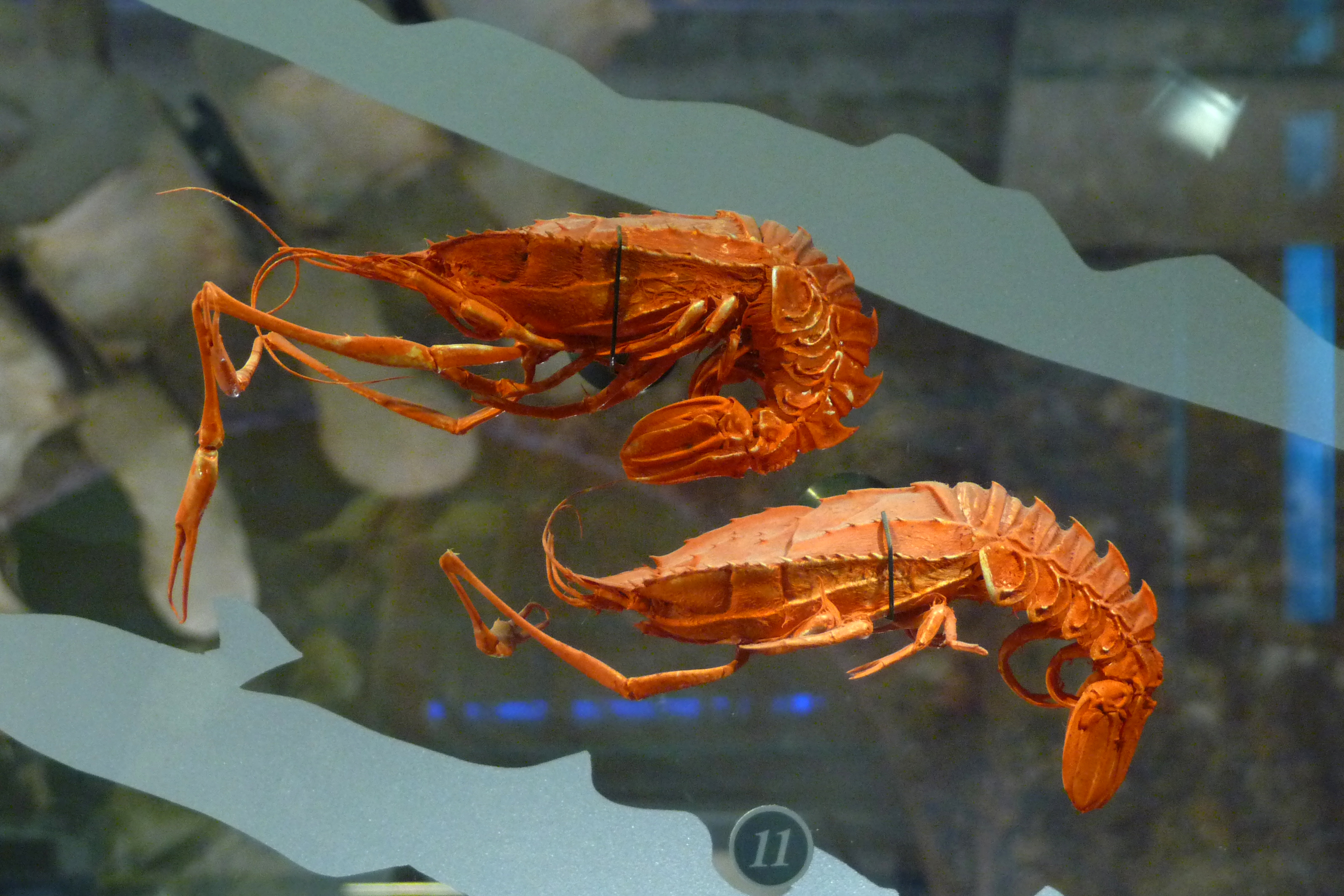
Stereomastis sculpta on display

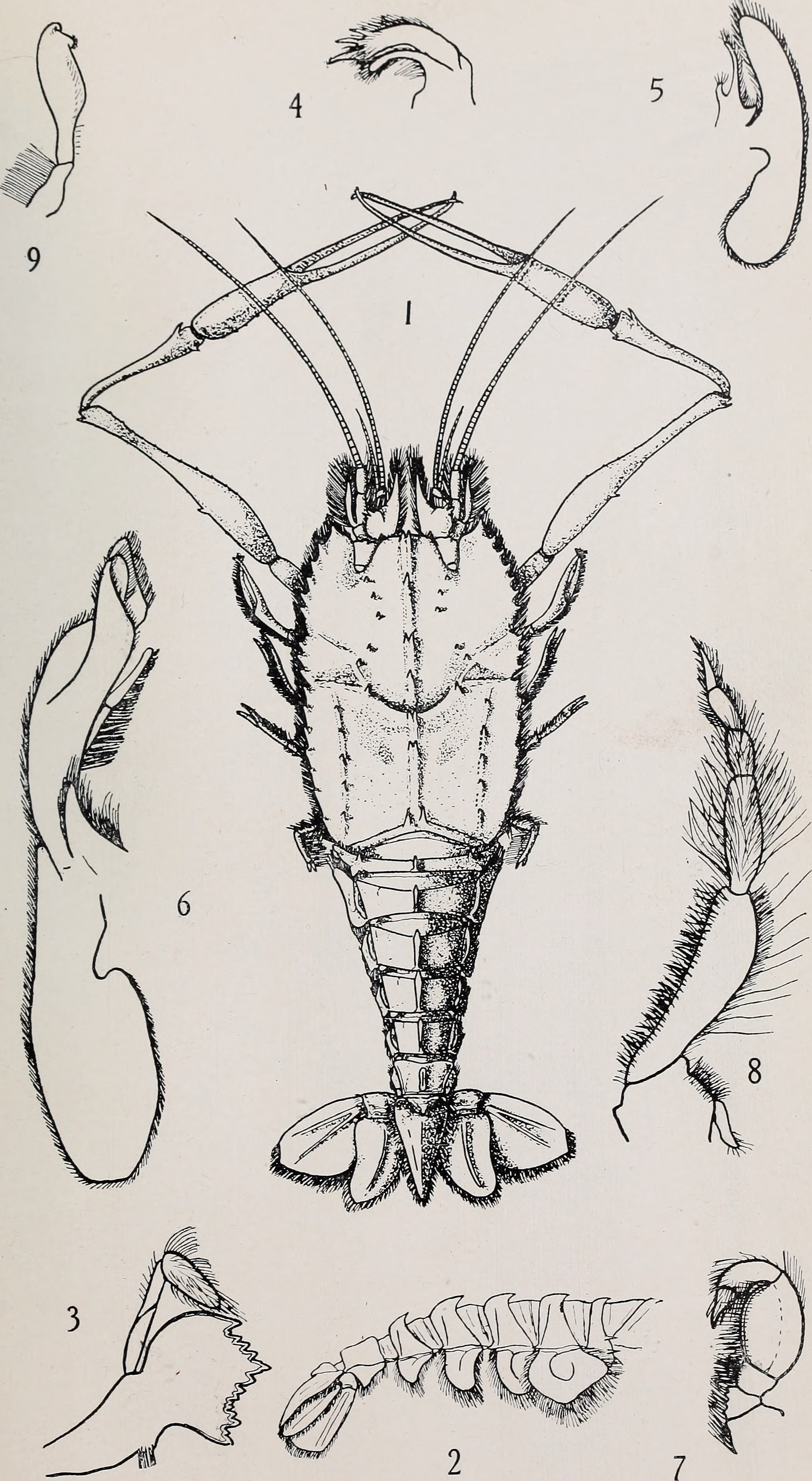
Illustration from Decapoda reptantia of the coasts of Ireland

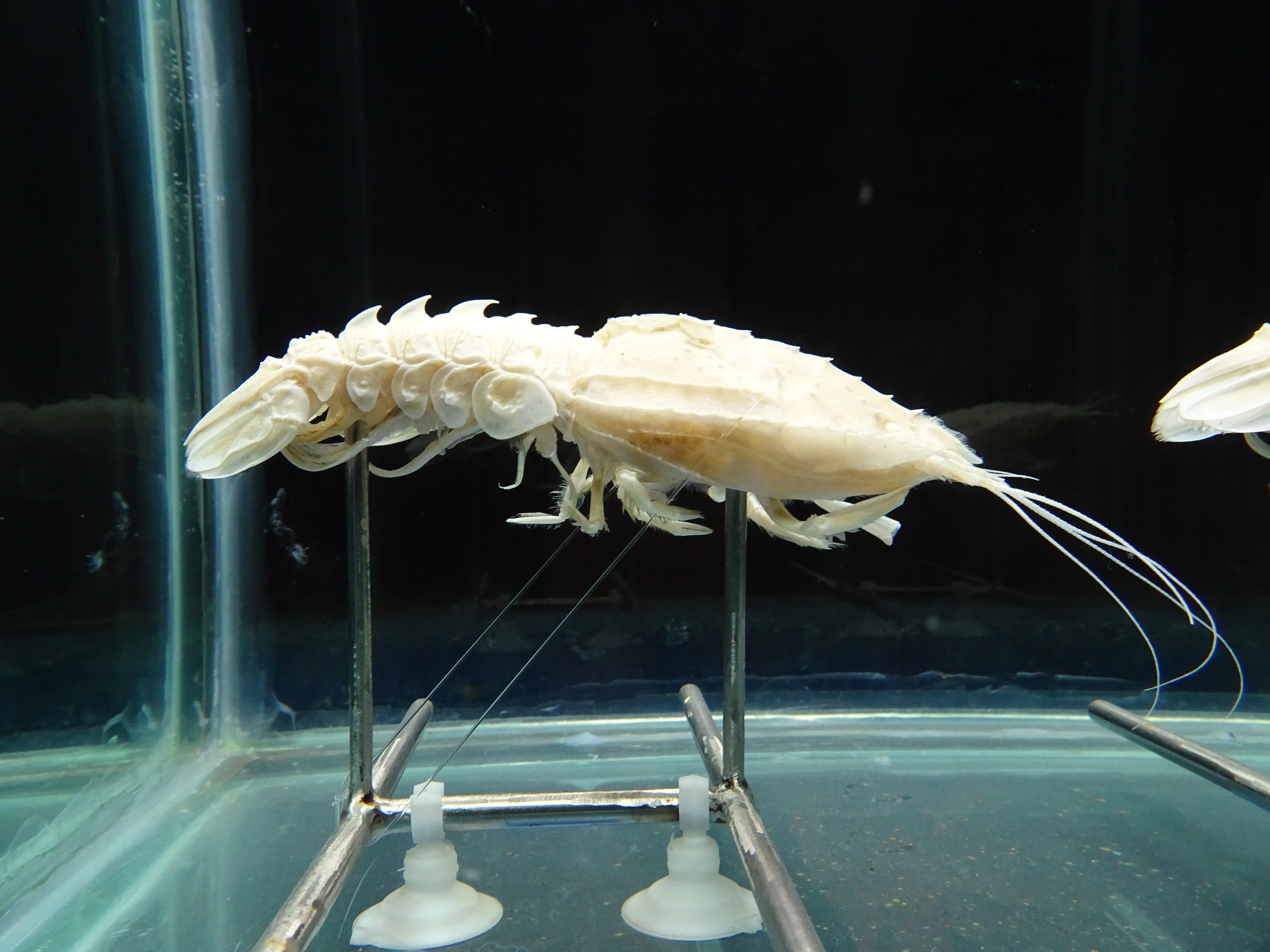
Stereomastis sculpta (syn. Polycheles sculptus) on display (colors have faded)

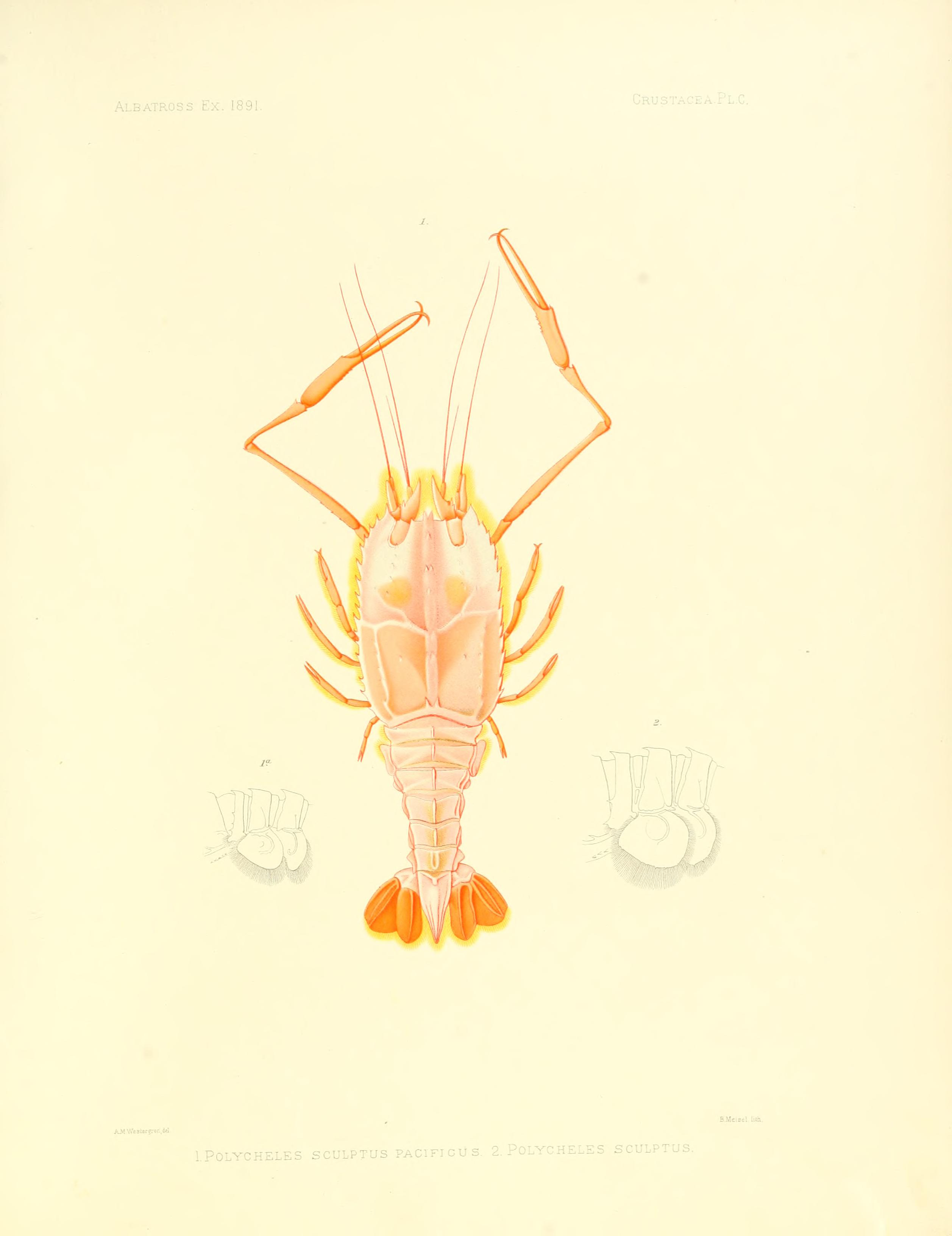
Illustration of Stereomastis sculpta (syn. Polycheles sculptus)
