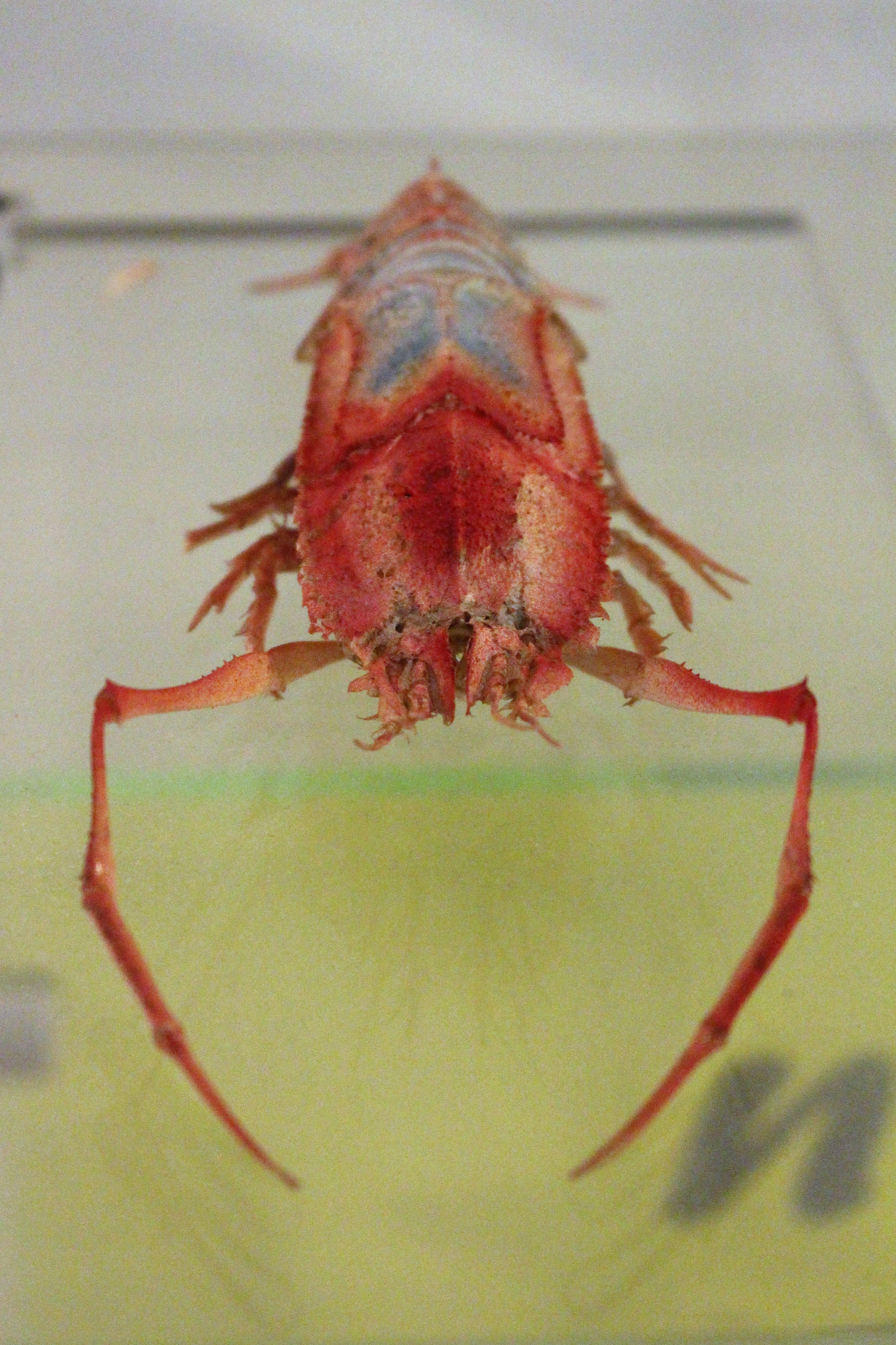
- Polycheles typhlops

Scientific classification
- Domain: Eukaryota
- Kingdom: Animalia
- Phylum: Arthropoda
- Class: Malacostraca
- Order: Decapoda
- Suborder: Pleocyemata
- Family: Polychelidae
- Genus: Polycheles; Sars, 1882

Type species
- Polycheles typhlops Heller, 1862

= Polycheles =

Genus of crustaceans

Polycheles is a genus of decapods within the family Polychelidae, with 9 current species assigned to it. Members of this genus are found in oceans worldwide at depths of 665 to 938 meters.

== Species ==
- Polycheles amemiyai Yokoya, 1933
- Polycheles baccatus Spence Bate, 1878
- Polycheles coccifer Galil, 2000
- Polycheles enthrix (Spence Bate, 1878)
- Polycheles kermadecensis (Sund, 1920)
- Polycheles martini Ahyong & Brown, 2002
- Polycheles perarmatus Holthuis, 1952
- Polycheles tanneri Faxon, 1893
- Polycheles typhlops Heller, 1862
