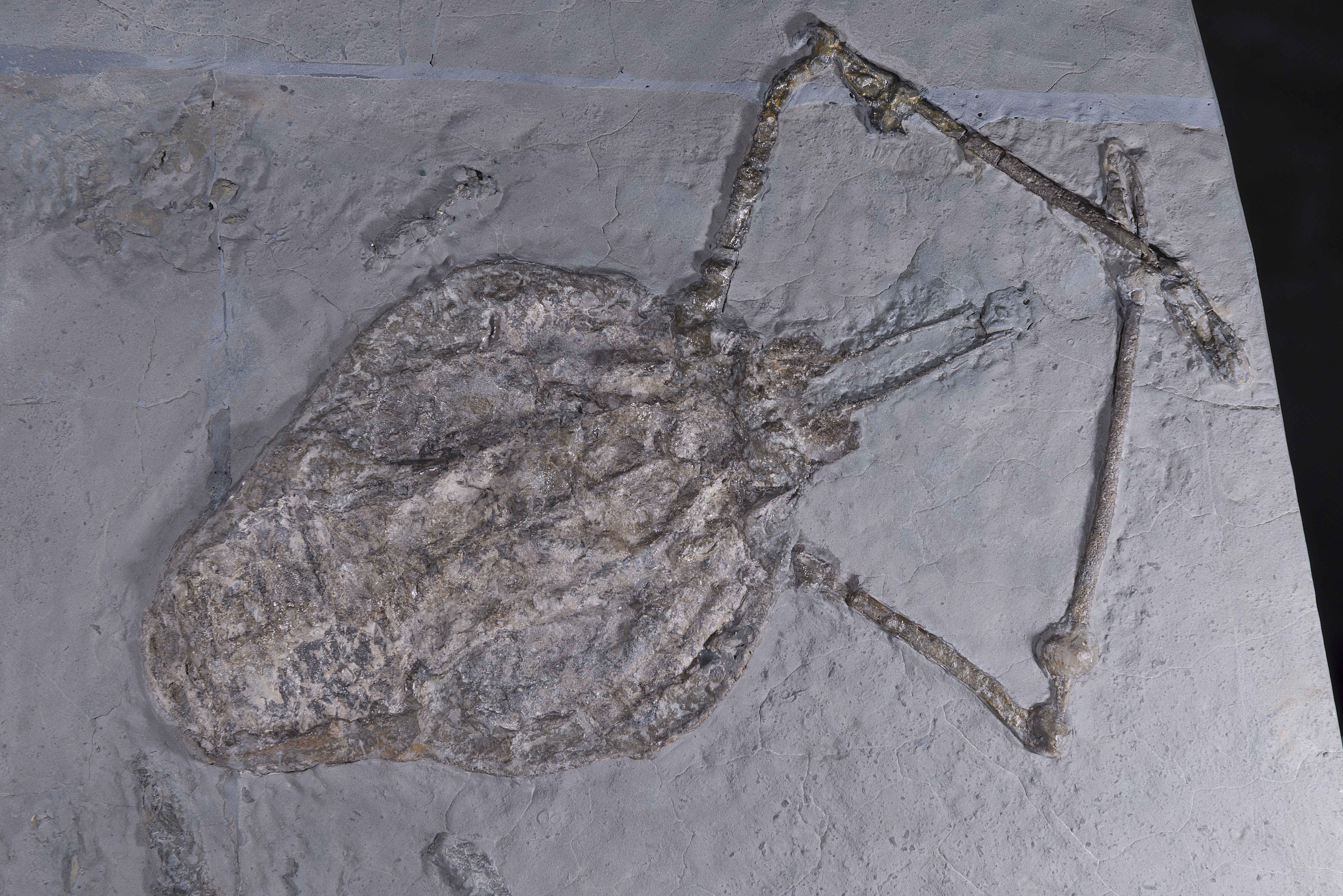
- Coleia gigantea

Scientific classification
- Domain: Eukaryota
- Kingdom: Animalia
- Phylum: Arthropoda
- Class: Malacostraca
- Order: Decapoda
- Suborder: Pleocyemata
- Superfamily: Eryonoidea
- Family: †Coleiidae; Van Straelen, 1924

= Coleiidae =

Extinct family of crustaceans

Coleiidae is a family of fossil decapod crustaceans, containing the following genera:

- Coleia Broderip, 1835
- Hasaracancer Jux, 1971
- Hellerocaris Van Straelen, 1924
- Proeryon Beurlen, 1928
- Pseudocoleia Garassino & Teruzzi, 1993
- Tropifer Gould, 1857
- Willemoesiocaris Van Straelen, 1924
