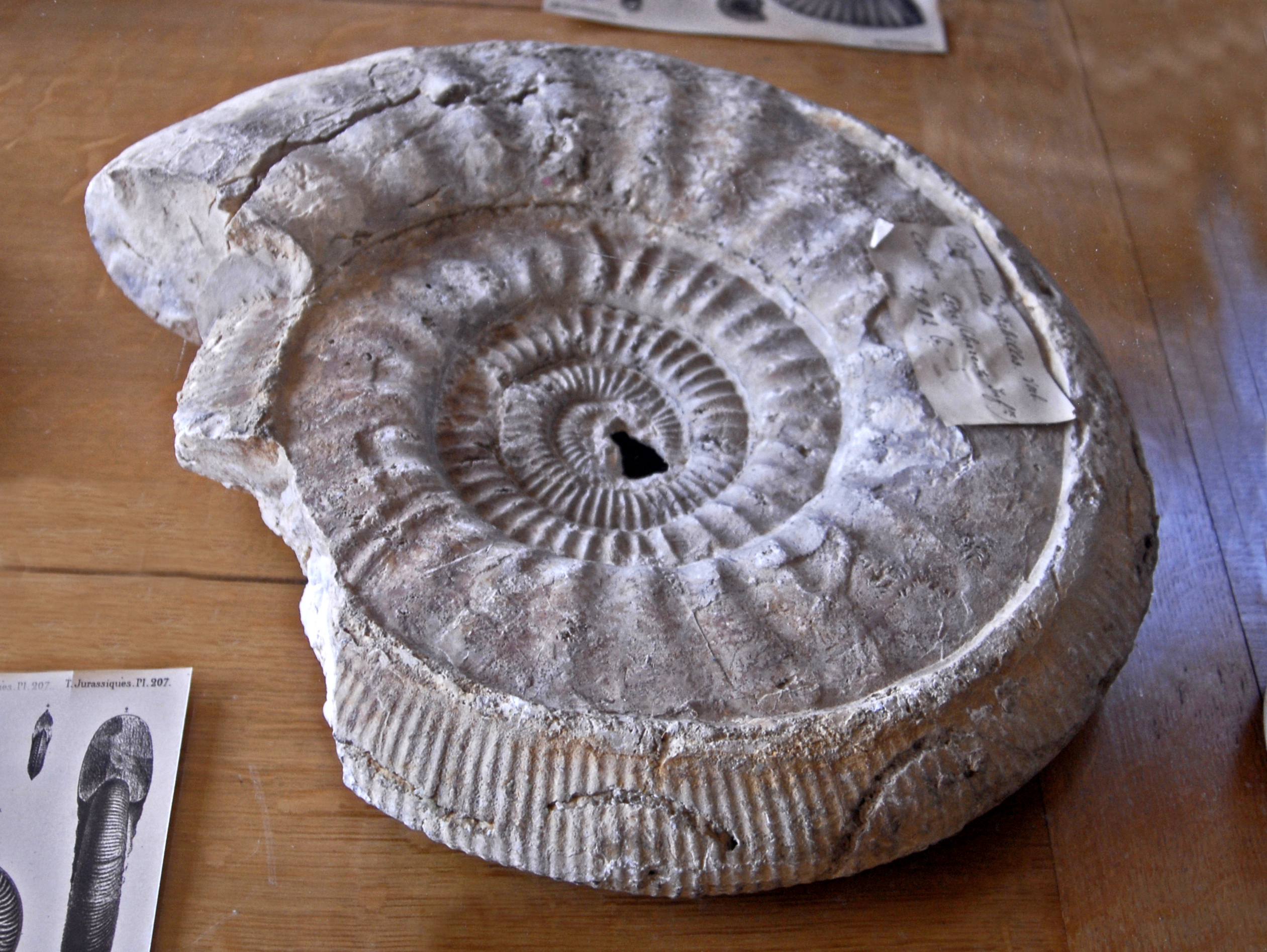
- Fossil of Lithacoceras achilles from France, on display at Galerie de paléontologie et d'anatomie comparée in Paris

Scientific classification
- Kingdom: Animalia
- Phylum: Mollusca
- Class: Cephalopoda
- Subclass: †Ammonoidea
- Order: †Ammonitida
- Family: †Ataxioceratidae
- Genus: †Lithacoceras; Hyatt, 1900

Species
- Lithacoceras malarguense Spath, 1931; Lithacoceras picunleufuense Parent et al., 2011

= Lithacoceras =

Lithacoceras Temporal range: Oxfordian–Tithonian

Genus of molluscs (fossil)

Lithacoceras is an extinct ammonite cephalopod genus included in the superfamily Perisphinctoidea. These fast-moving nektonic carnivores lived during the Jurassic period, from the Oxfordian age to the Tithonian age.

== Distribution ==
Fossils of species within this genus have been found in the Jurassic sediments of Antarctica, Argentina, Canada, Cuba, France, Germany, Madagascar, Somalia, Spain, United States and Yemen.
