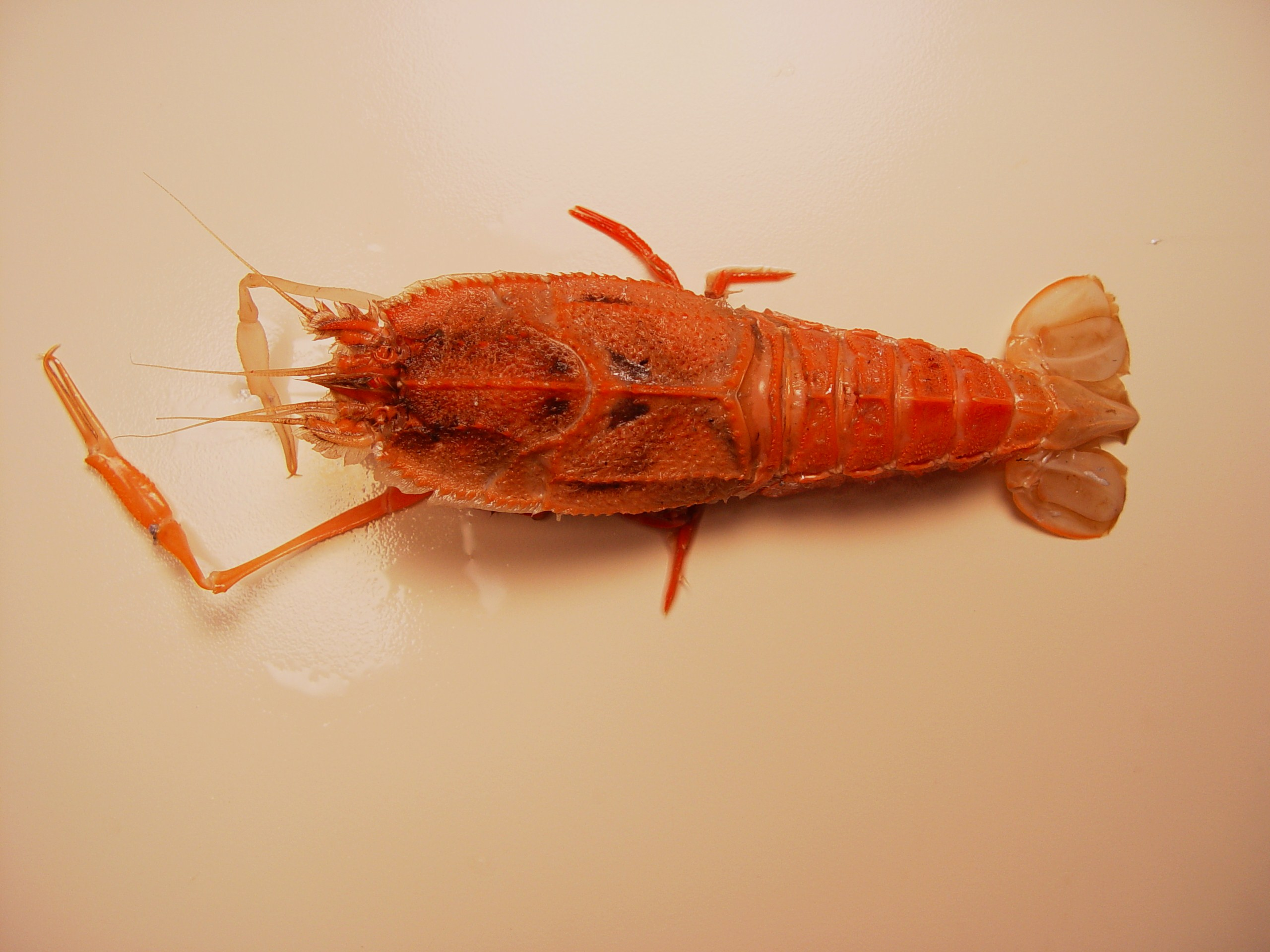
- Stereomastis sculpta

Scientific classification
- Domain: Eukaryota
- Kingdom: Animalia
- Phylum: Arthropoda
- Class: Malacostraca
- Order: Decapoda
- Suborder: Pleocyemata
- Infraorder: Polychelida
- Family: Polychelidae; Wood-Mason, 1874

Genera
- Antarcticheles Aguirre-Urreta, Buatois, Chernoglasov & Medina, 1990 †; Cardus Galil, 2000; Homeryon Galil, 2000; Pentacheles Bate, 1878; Polycheles Heller, 1862; Willemoesia Grote, 1873

= Polychelidae =

Polychelidae Temporal range: Upper Jurassic–Recent

Family of crustaceans

The family Polychelidae contains thirty-eight extant species of blind, benthic lobster-like crustaceans. They are found throughout the world's tropical, sub-tropical and temperate oceans, including the Mediterranean Sea and the Irish Sea.

== Anatomy ==
The family Polychelidae is notable for the number of chelate (clawed) limbs, with either four or all five pairs of pereiopods bearing claws. This gives rise to the scientific names Polycheles (many-clawed) and Pentacheles (five claws). The first pair of periopods are greatly elongated, but often become broken off while specimens are being brought to the surface. The rostrum is very short or absent, and, although eyestalks are present, the eyes are absent. This family can be seen as evidence of the transition from shrimp-like animals to lobster-like animals, since they possess a number of primitive characters (plesiomorphies), such as the pointed telson, in contrast to the rounded telson in lobsters.

== Discovery ==
Although apparently widespread, and at least locally common, they were first discovered only in the late nineteenth century when they were dredged up by the Challenger expedition from a depth supposed to be "barren, if not of all life, certainly of animals so high in the scale of existence" (Charles Spence Bate). Their kinship with the fossil group Eryonoidea, including well-known genera such as Eryon, was immediately recognised. Since Eryon and its relatives were only known from fossils, lastly in the Jurassic, this made the Polychelidae something of a living fossil.

The reason that polychelids remained unknown for so long is that they live on the sea-floor, often at great depths; the family as a whole has a depth range from less than 100 metres (330 ft) to over 5,000 metres (16,000 ft). This also accounts for the lack of eyesight, since almost none of the sun's light penetrates to such abyssal depths.

== Fossil record ==
A single fossil species is known, Antarcticheles antarcticus, which was found in Jurassic sediments on James Ross Island, close to the Prince Gustav Channel.

== Larvae ==
The larvae of polychelids are very distinctive, and were first described under the name Eryoneicus. Over forty different larval forms are known, although few can be ascribed to known adult species.

== Classification ==
- Polycheles Heller, 1862
  - Polycheles aculeatus Galil, 2000
  - Polycheles auriculatus (Bate, 1878)
  - Polycheles baccatus Bate, 1878
  - Polycheles ceratus Alcock, 1878
  - Polycheles coccifer Galil, 2000
  - Polycheles enthrix (Bate, 1878)
  - Polycheles evexus Galil, 2000
  - Polycheles galil Ahyong & Brown, 2002
  - Polycheles helleri Bate, 1878
  - Polycheles kermadecensis Ahyong and Brown, 2002
  - Polycheles nanus (S. I. Smith, 1884)
  - Polycheles pacificus (Faxon, 1893)
  - Polycheles perarmatus Holthuis, 1952
  - Polycheles phosphorus (Alcock, 1894)
  - Polycheles politus Galil, 2000
  - Polycheles suhmi (Bate, 1878)
  - Polycheles surdus Galil, 2000
  - Polycheles talismani (Bouvier, 1917)
  - Polycheles tanneri Faxon, 1893
  - Polycheles trispinosus (De Man, 1905)
  - Polycheles typhlops Heller, 1862
- †Antarcticheles Aguirre-Urreta, Buatois, Chernoglasov & Medina, 1990
  - †Antarcticheles antarcticus Aguirre-Urreta, Buatois, Chernoglasov & Medina, 1990
- Cardus Galil, 2000
  - Cardus crucifer (Thomson, 1873)
- Homeryon Galil, 2000
  - Homeryon armarium Galil, 2000
  - Homeryon asper (Rathbun, 1906)
- Pentacheles Bate, 1878
  - Pentacheles gibbus Alcock, 1894
  - Pentacheles laevis Bate, 1878
  - Pentacheles obscurus Bate, 1878
  - Pentacheles snyderii (Rathbun, 1906)
  - Pentacheles validus A. Milne-Edwards, 1880
- Willemoesia Grote, 1873
  - Willemoesia forceps A. Milne Edwards, 1880
  - Willemoesia inornata Faxon, 1893
  - Willemoesia leptodactyla (Willemoes-Suhm, 1875)
  - Willemoesia pacifica Sund, 1920
- †Angusteryon Audo & Furrer, 2020
  - Augusteryon oberlii
