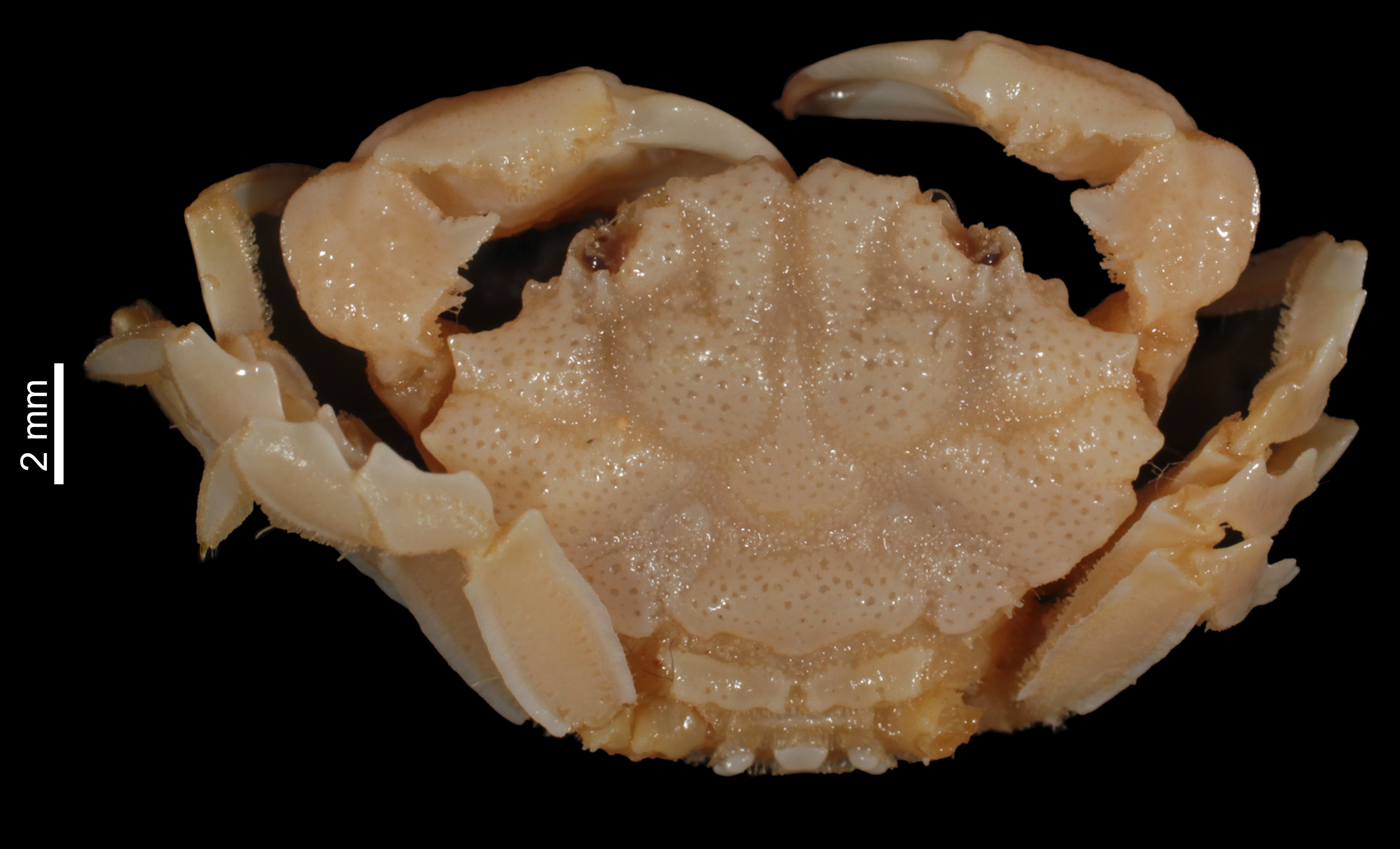

Scientific classification
- Kingdom: Animalia
- Phylum: Arthropoda
- Class: Malacostraca
- Order: Decapoda
- Suborder: Pleocyemata
- Infraorder: Brachyura
- Family: Xanthidae
- Genus: Antrocarcinus; Ng & D. G. B. Chia, 1994
- Species: A. petrosus

Binomial name
- Antrocarcinus petrosus Ng & D. G. B. Chia, 1994

= Antrocarcinus =

Genus of crabs

Antrocarcinus petrosus is a species of crab in the family Xanthidae, the only species in the genus Antrocarcinus.
