= Garthiella =

Scientific classification
- Kingdom: Animalia
- Phylum: Arthropoda
- Class: Malacostraca
- Order: Decapoda
- Suborder: Pleocyemata
- Infraorder: Brachyura
- Family: Xanthidae
- Genus: Garthiella
- Species: G. aberrans

Binomial name
- Garthiella aberrans (Rathbun, 1906)

Genus of crabs

Garthiella aberrans is a species of crabs in the family Xanthidae, the only species in the genus Garthiella.
