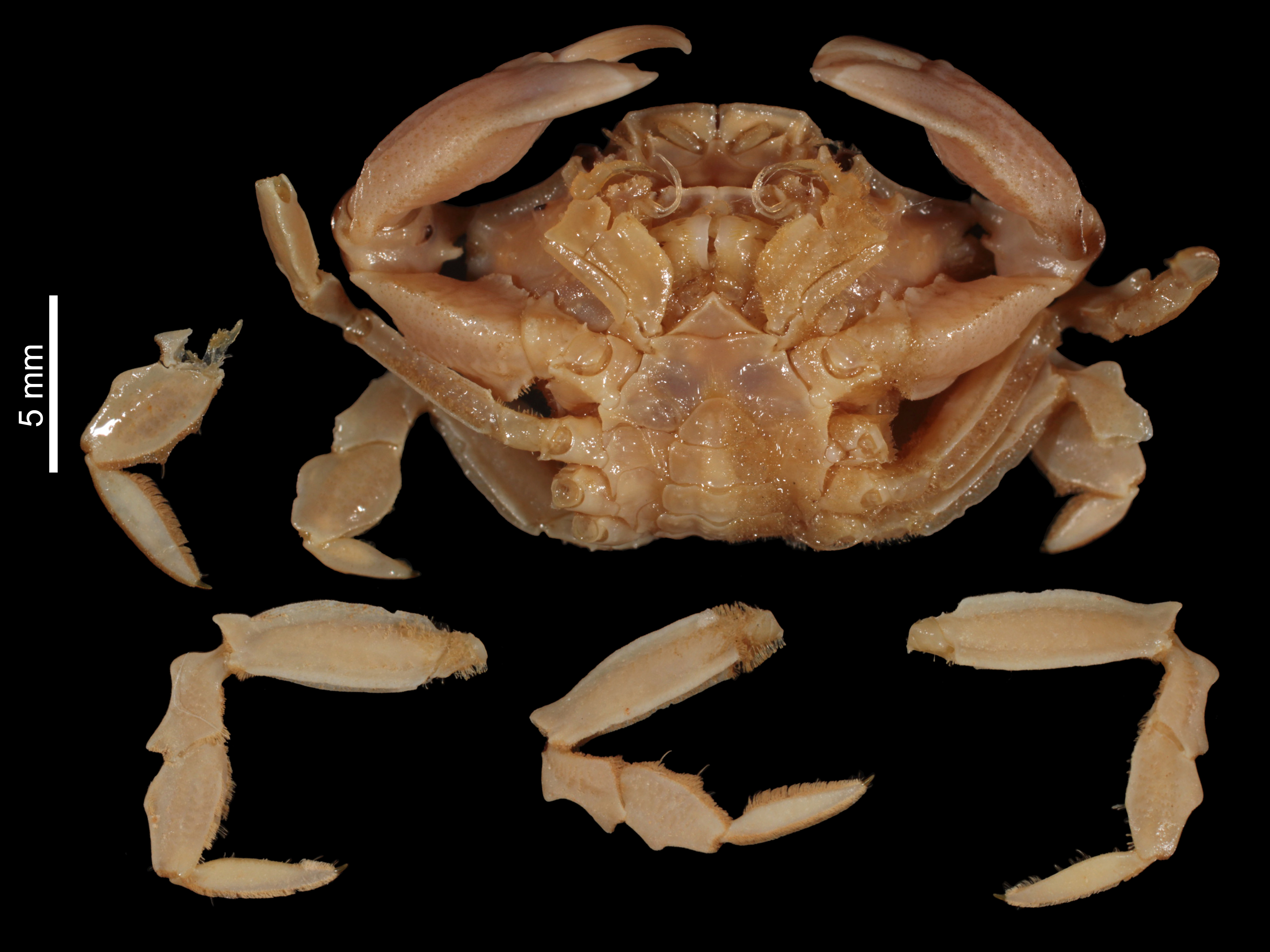
- Glyptocarcinus politus

Scientific classification
- Domain: Eukaryota
- Kingdom: Animalia
- Phylum: Arthropoda
- Class: Malacostraca
- Order: Decapoda
- Suborder: Pleocyemata
- Infraorder: Brachyura
- Family: Xanthidae
- Genus: Glyptocarcinus; Takeda, 1973

= Glyptocarcinus =

Genus of crabs

Glyptocarcinus is a genus of crabs in the family Xanthidae, containing the following species:

- Glyptocarcinus lophopus Takeda, 1973
- Glyptocarcinus politus Ng & Chia, 1994
