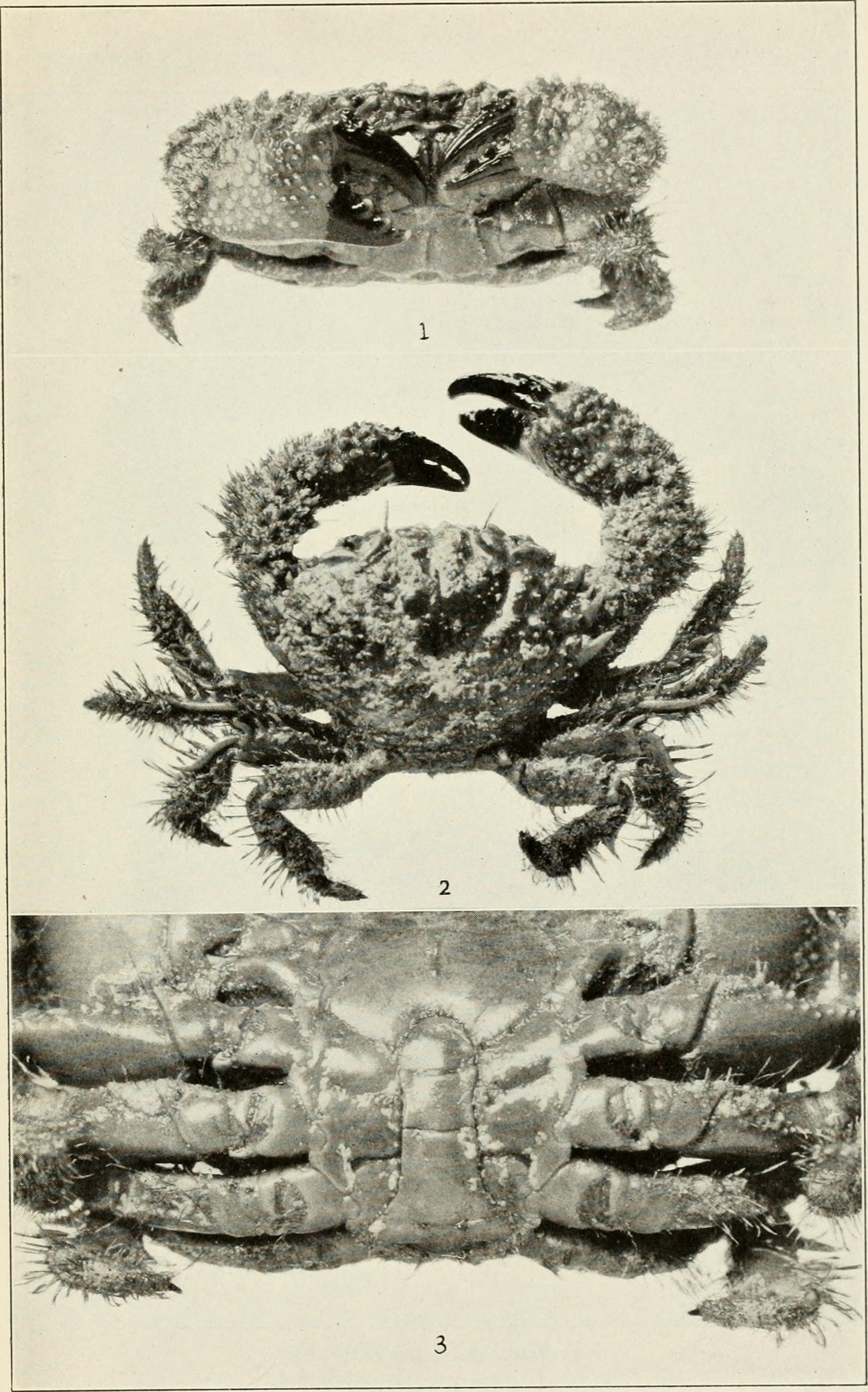
- Heteractaea ceratopus

Scientific classification
- Domain: Eukaryota
- Kingdom: Animalia
- Phylum: Arthropoda
- Class: Malacostraca
- Order: Decapoda
- Suborder: Pleocyemata
- Infraorder: Brachyura
- Family: Xanthidae
- Subfamily: Actaeinae
- Genus: Heteractaea; Lockington, 1877

= Heteractaea =

Genus of crabs

Heteractaea is a genus of crabs in the family Xanthidae, containing the following species:

- Heteractaea ceratopus (Stimpson, 1860)
- Heteractaea lunata (Lucas, 1844)
- Heteractaea peterseni Garth, 1940
