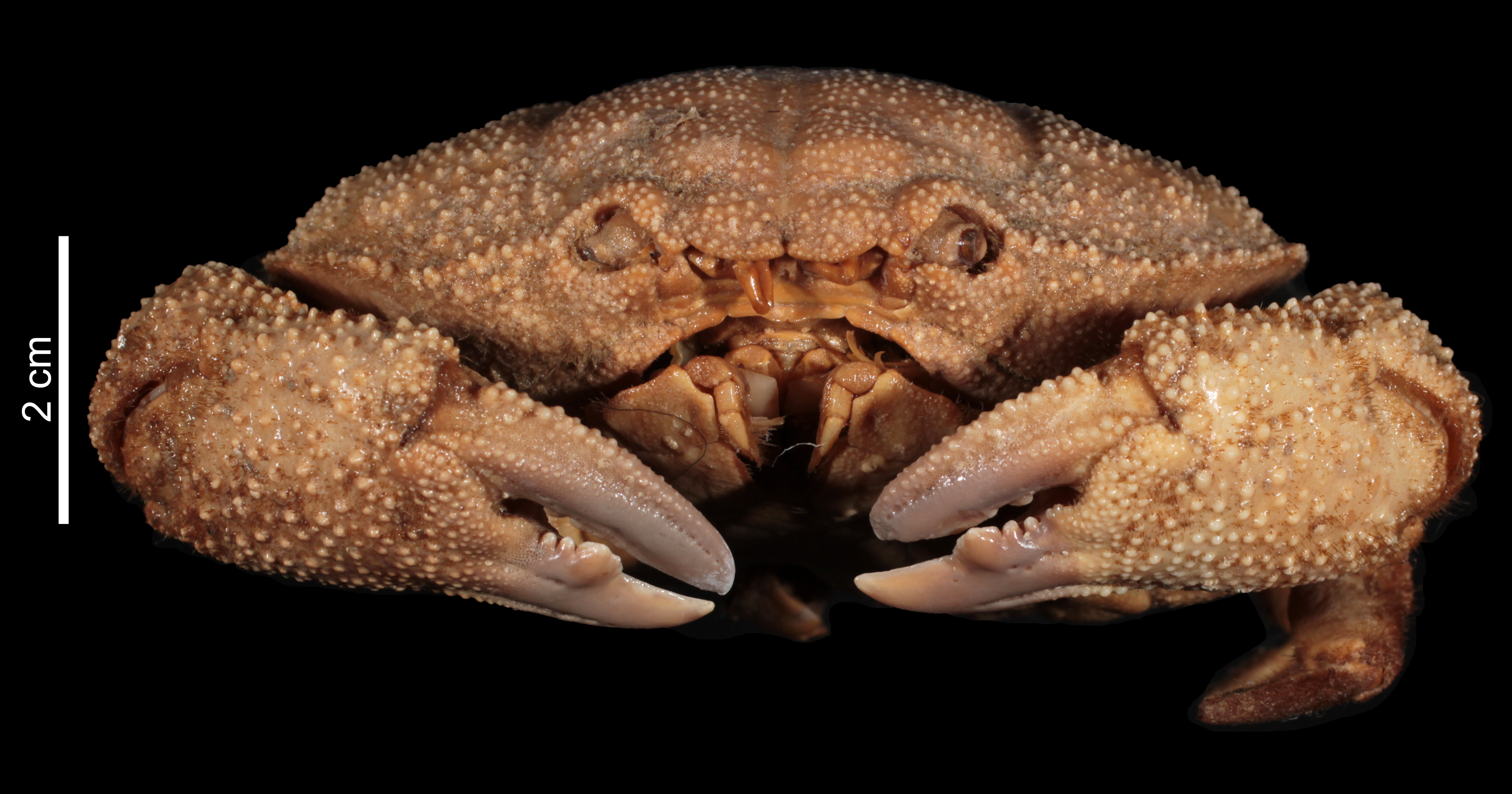
- Atergatopsis granulata

Scientific classification
- Domain: Eukaryota
- Kingdom: Animalia
- Phylum: Arthropoda
- Class: Malacostraca
- Order: Decapoda
- Suborder: Pleocyemata
- Infraorder: Brachyura
- Family: Xanthidae
- Subfamily: Zosiminae
- Genus: Atergatopsis; A. Milne-Edwards, 1862

= Atergatopsis =

Genus of crabs

Atergatopsis is a genus of crabs in the family Xanthidae, containing the following species:

- Atergatopsis alcocki (Laurie, 1906)
- Atergatopsis amoyensis De Man, 1879
- Atergatopsis germainii A. Milne-Edwards, 1865
- Atergatopsis granulata A. Milne-Edwards, 1865
- Atergatopsis immigrans (Edmondson, 1962)
- Atergatopsis inskipensis (Rathbun, 1923)
- Atergatopsis lucasii Montrouzier, 1865
- Atergatopsis obesa (A. Milne-Edwards, 1865)
- Atergatopsis signata (Adams & White, 1849)
- Atergatopsis tweediei Balss, 1938
