= Batodaeus =

Scientific classification
- Domain: Eukaryota
- Kingdom: Animalia
- Phylum: Arthropoda
- Class: Malacostraca
- Order: Decapoda
- Suborder: Pleocyemata
- Infraorder: Brachyura
- Family: Xanthidae
- Genus: Batodaeus
- Species: B. urinator

Binomial name
- Batodaeus urinator (A. Milne-Edwards, 1880)

Genus of crabs

Batodaeus urinator is a species of crabs in the family Xanthidae, the only species in the genus Batodaeus.
