= Hepatoporus =

Scientific classification
- Domain: Eukaryota
- Kingdom: Animalia
- Phylum: Arthropoda
- Class: Malacostraca
- Order: Decapoda
- Suborder: Pleocyemata
- Infraorder: Brachyura
- Family: Xanthidae
- Subfamily: Euxanthinae
- Genus: Hepatoporus; Serène, 1984

Genus of crabs

Hepatoporus is a genus of crabs in the family Xanthidae, containing the following species:

- Hepatoporus asper Davie & Turner, 1994
- Hepatoporus distinctus (Takeda & Nagai, 1986)
- Hepatoporus guinotae (Zarenkov, 1971)
- Hepatoporus orientalis (Sakai, 1935)
- Hepatoporus pumex Mendoza & Ng, 2008
- Hepatoporus vadosus Mendoza, 2023
