= Epixanthops =

Scientific classification
- Domain: Eukaryota
- Kingdom: Animalia
- Phylum: Arthropoda
- Class: Malacostraca
- Order: Decapoda
- Suborder: Pleocyemata
- Infraorder: Brachyura
- Family: Xanthidae
- Genus: Epixanthops; Serène, 1984
- Species: E. casellatoi

Binomial name
- Epixanthops casellatoi Serène, 1984

Genus of crabs

Epixanthops casellatoi is a species of crabs in the family Xanthidae, the only species in the genus Epixanthops.
