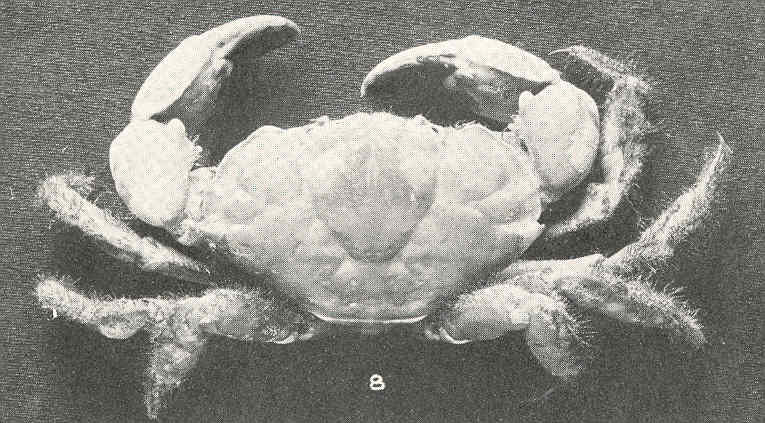
- Lophozozymus intonsus

Scientific classification
- Kingdom: Animalia
- Phylum: Arthropoda
- Class: Malacostraca
- Order: Decapoda
- Suborder: Pleocyemata
- Infraorder: Brachyura
- Family: Xanthidae
- Genus: Juxtaxanthias; Ward, 1942

= Juxtaxanthias =

Genus of crabs

Juxtaxanthias is a genus of crabs in the family Xanthidae, containing the following species:

- Juxtaxanthias intonsus (Randall, 1840)
- Juxtaxanthias lividus (Latrielle, 1812)
- Juxtaxanthias tetradon (Heller, 1862)
