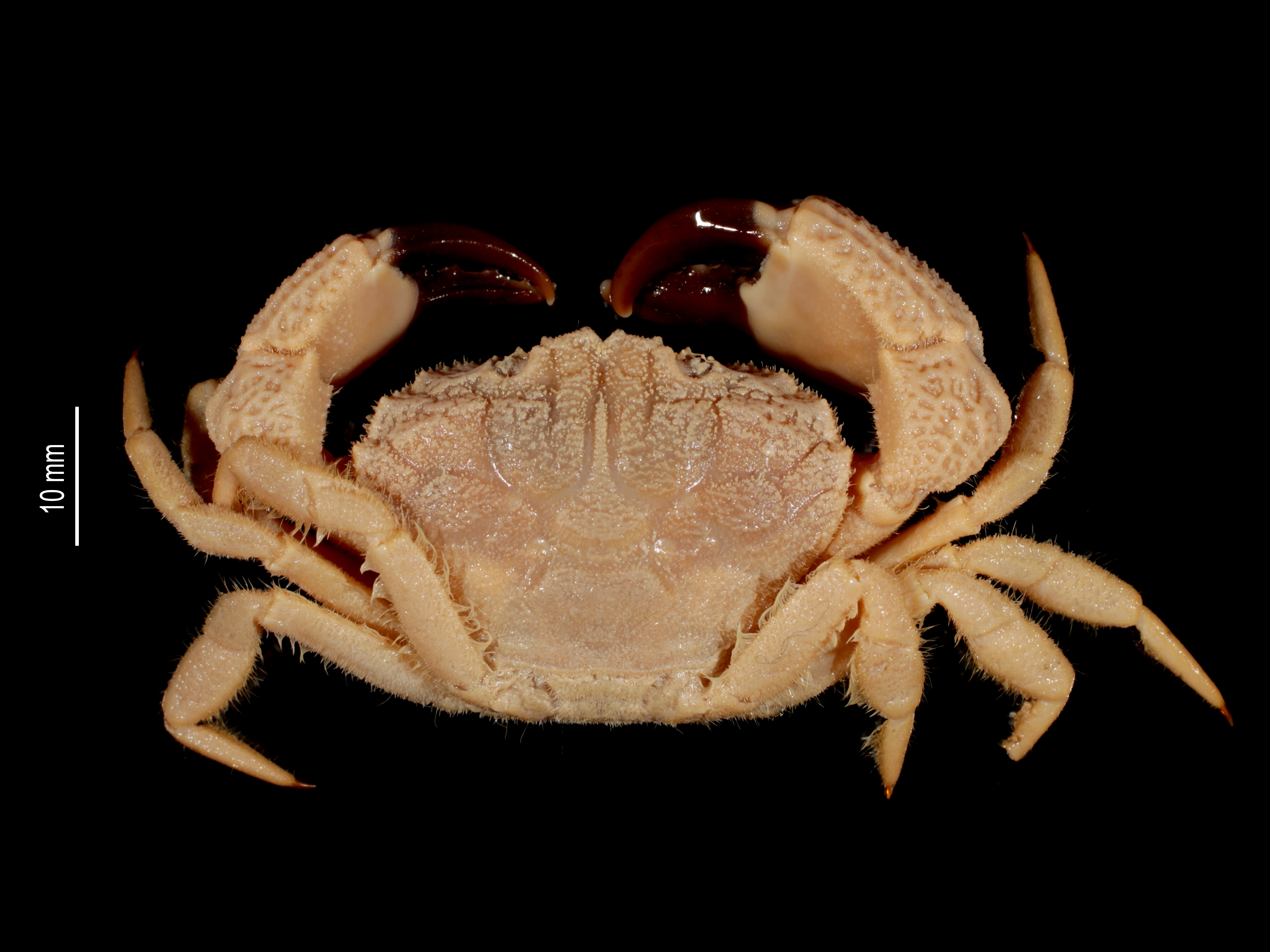

Scientific classification
- Domain: Eukaryota
- Kingdom: Animalia
- Phylum: Arthropoda
- Class: Malacostraca
- Order: Decapoda
- Suborder: Pleocyemata
- Infraorder: Brachyura
- Family: Xanthidae
- Genus: Epistocavea; Davie, 1992
- Species: E. mururoa

Binomial name
- Epistocavea mururoa Davie, 1992

= Epistocavea =

Genus of crabs

Epistocavea mururoa is a species of crabs in the family Xanthidae, the only species in the genus Epistocavea.
