= Odhnea =

Scientific classification
- Kingdom: Animalia
- Phylum: Arthropoda
- Clade: Pancrustacea
- Class: Malacostraca
- Order: Decapoda
- Suborder: Pleocyemata
- Infraorder: Brachyura
- Family: Xanthidae
- Subfamily: Actaeinae
- Genus: Odhnea; Ng & Low, 2010

Genus of crabs

Odhnea is a genus of crabs in the family Xanthidae, containing the following species:

- Odhnea acutidens (T. Sakai, 1983)
- Odhnea echinus (Alcock, 1898)
