= Zozymodes =

Scientific classification
- Domain: Eukaryota
- Kingdom: Animalia
- Phylum: Arthropoda
- Class: Malacostraca
- Order: Decapoda
- Suborder: Pleocyemata
- Infraorder: Brachyura
- Family: Xanthidae
- Subfamily: Zosiminae
- Genus: Zozymodes; Heller, 1860

Type species
- Zozymodes carinipes Heller, 1860

Genus of crabs

Zozymodes is a genus of crabs in the family Xanthidae, and was first described in 1861 by Camill Heller.

It contains the following species:

- Zozymodes cavipes (Dana, 1852)
- Zozymodes nodosus Klunzinger, 1913
- Zozymodes pumilus (Hombron & Jacquinot, 1846)
- Zozymodes xanthoides (Krauss, 1843)
