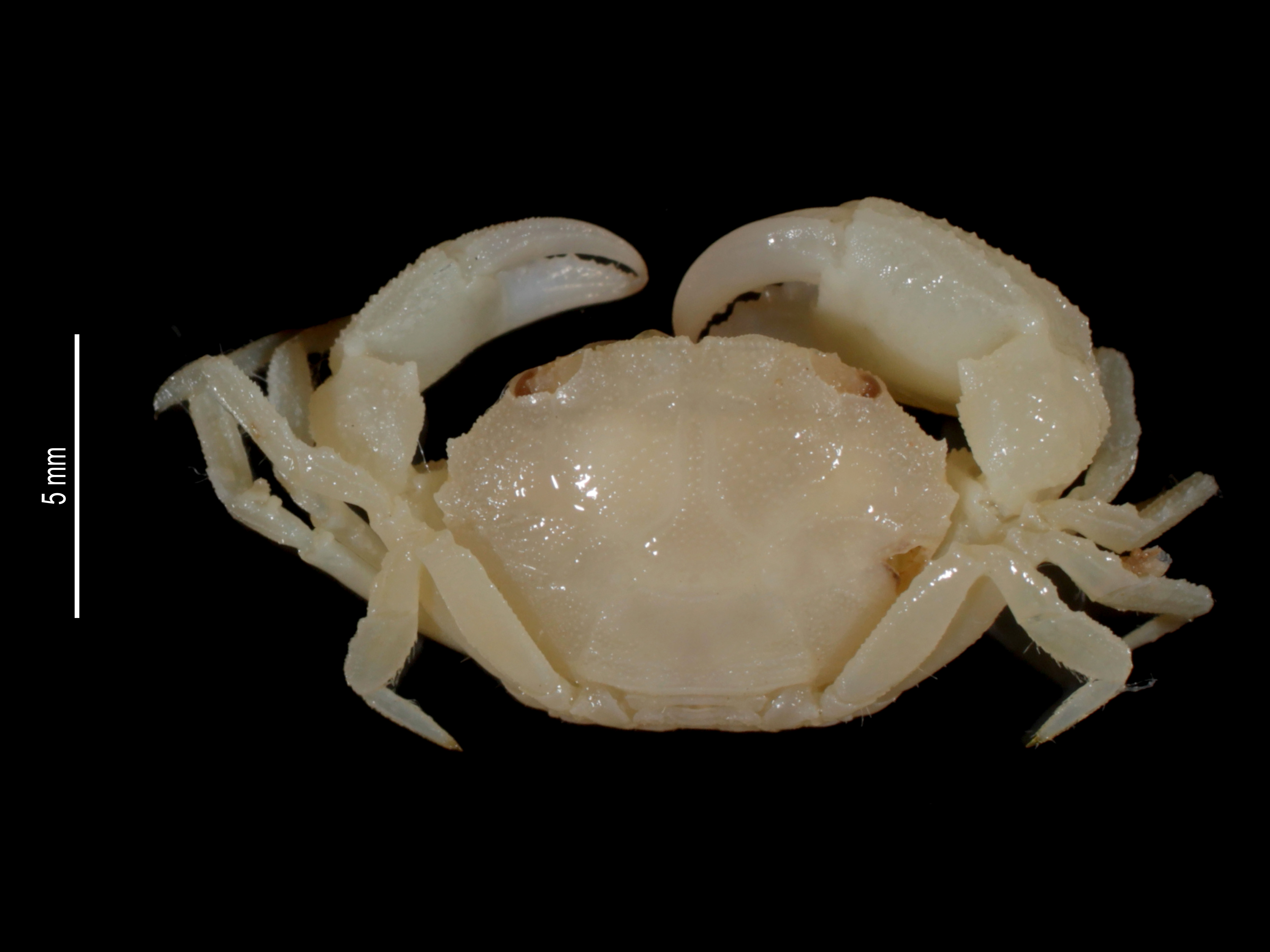
- Alainodaeus nuku

Scientific classification
- Kingdom: Animalia
- Phylum: Arthropoda
- Clade: Pancrustacea
- Class: Malacostraca
- Order: Decapoda
- Suborder: Pleocyemata
- Infraorder: Brachyura
- Family: Xanthidae
- Subfamily: Euxanthinae
- Genus: Alainodaeus; Davie, 1992

= Alainodaeus =

Genus of crabs

Alainodaeus is a genus of crabs in the family Xanthidae, containing the following species:

- Alainodaeus akiaki Davie, 1992
- Alainodaeus alis Davie, 1997
- Alainodaeus bertrandi Mendoza, 2023
- Alainodaeus crosnieri Mendoza, 2023
- Alainodaeus filipinus Mendoza & Ng, 2008
- Alainodaeus nuku Davie, 1997
- Alainodaeus rimatara Davie, 1992
