= Danielea =

Scientific classification
- Kingdom: Animalia
- Phylum: Arthropoda
- Clade: Pancrustacea
- Class: Malacostraca
- Order: Decapoda
- Suborder: Pleocyemata
- Infraorder: Brachyura
- Family: Xanthidae
- Genus: Danielea; Ng & Clark, 2003
- Species: D. noelensis

Binomial name
- Danielea noelensis (Ward, 1935)

Synonyms
- Medaeus noelensis Ward, 1935; Paramedaeus noelensis (Ward, 1935)

Genus of crabs

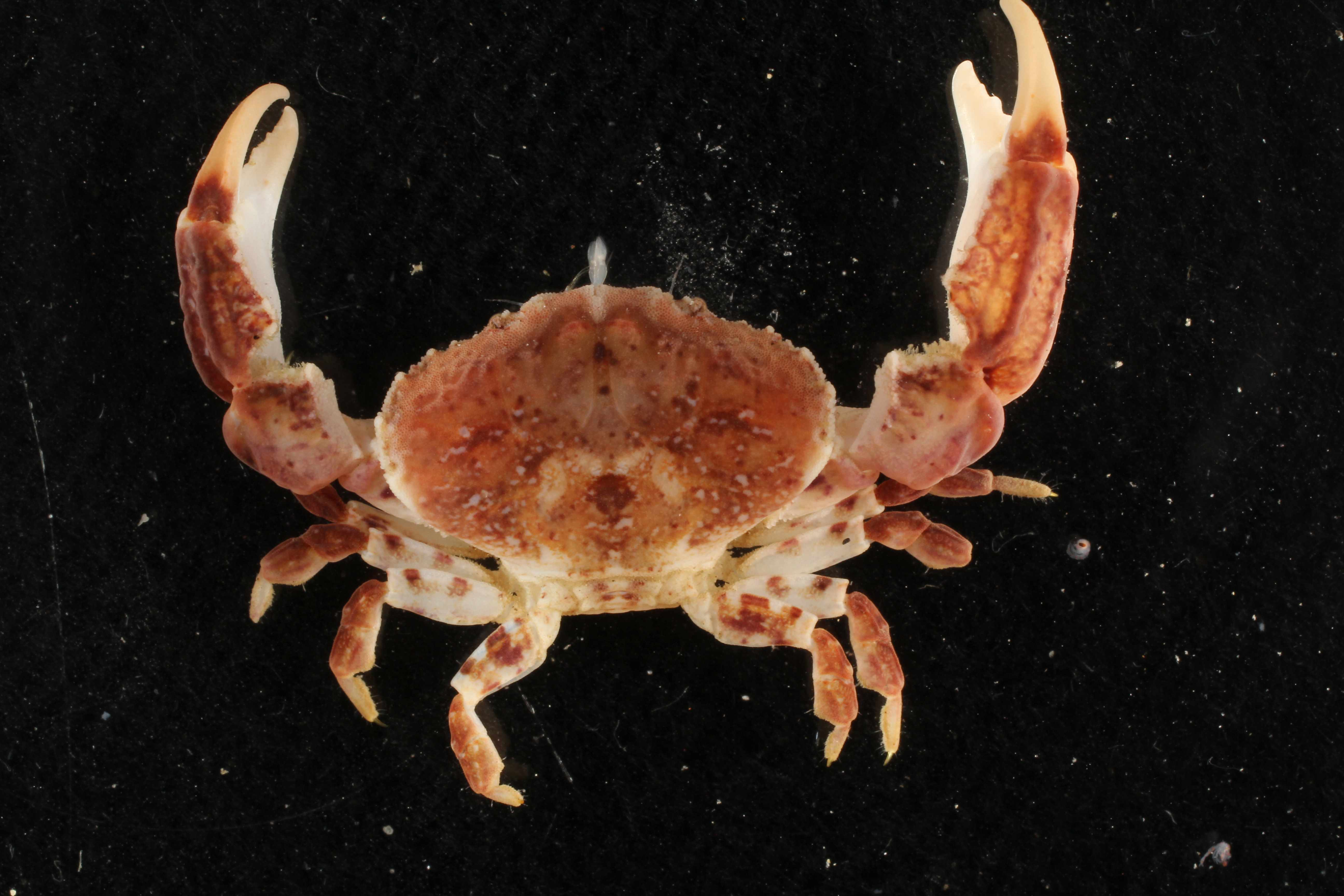
Danielea noelensis

Danielea noelensis is a species of crab in the family Xanthidae, and the only species in the genus Danielea.
