= Epiactaeodes =

Scientific classification
- Domain: Eukaryota
- Kingdom: Animalia
- Phylum: Arthropoda
- Class: Malacostraca
- Order: Decapoda
- Suborder: Pleocyemata
- Infraorder: Brachyura
- Family: Xanthidae
- Genus: Epiactaeodes; Serène, 1984

Genus of crabs

Epiactaeodes is a genus of crabs in the family Xanthidae, containing the following species:

- Epiactaeodes pictus (Zehntner, 1894)
- Epiactaeodes tesselatus (Pocock, 1890)
