= Pseudophlyctenodes =

Pseudophlyctenodes Temporal range: Eocene

Scientific classification
- Kingdom: Animalia
- Phylum: Arthropoda
- Class: Malacostraca
- Order: Decapoda
- Suborder: Pleocyemata
- Infraorder: Brachyura
- Family: Xanthidae
- Genus: †Pseudophlyctenodes; Busulini, Tessier & Beschin, 2006
- Species: †P. hantkeni

Binomial name
- †Pseudophlyctenodes hantkeni (Lőrenthey, 1898)

Extinct genus of crabs

Pseudophlyctenodes hantkeni is an extinct species of crab in the monotypic genus Pseudophlyctenodes, in the family Xanthidae. It is known from the Eocene of Hungary and Sicily.
