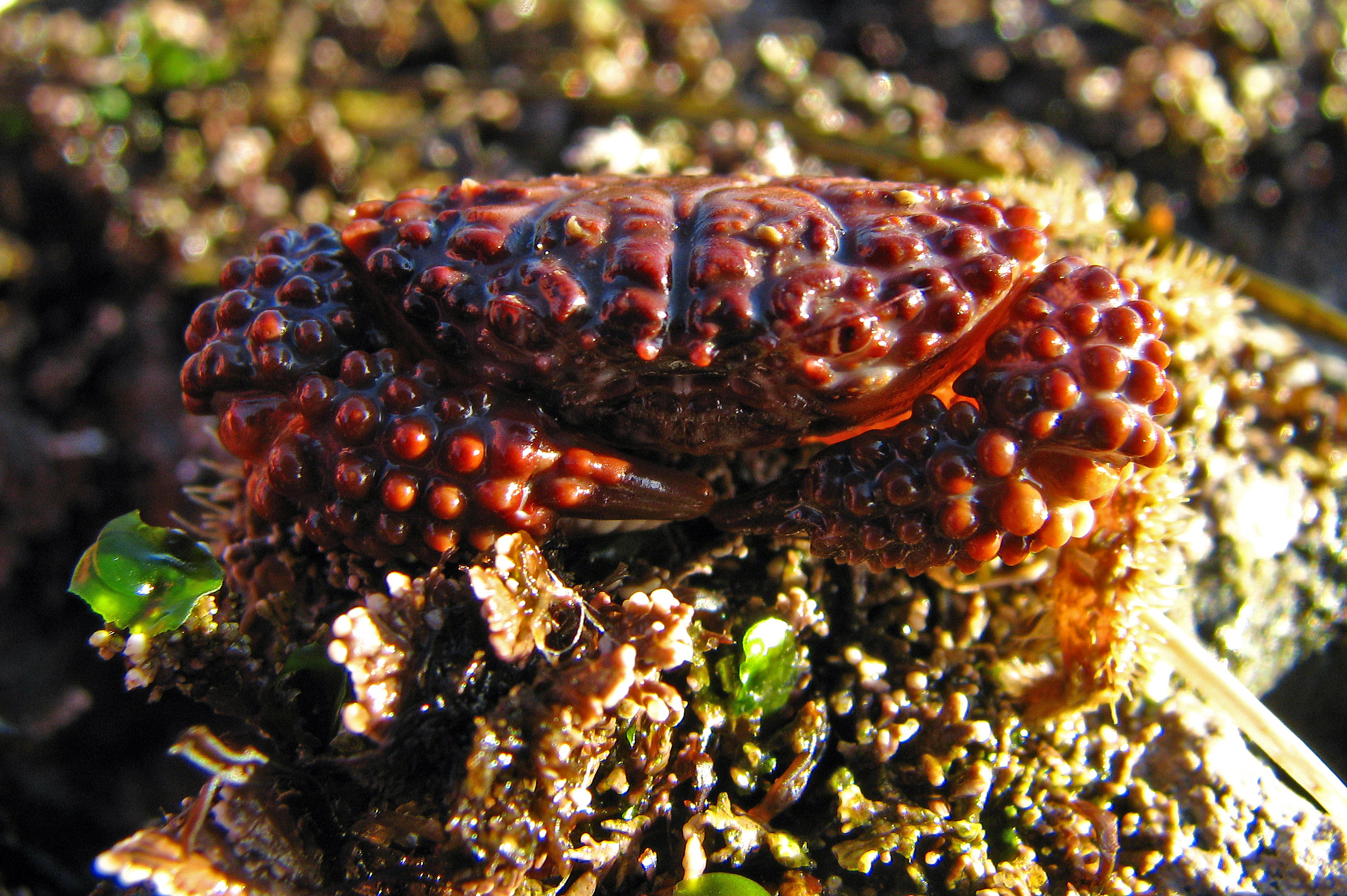
- Paraxanthias taylori

Scientific classification
- Kingdom: Animalia
- Phylum: Arthropoda
- Class: Malacostraca
- Order: Decapoda
- Suborder: Pleocyemata
- Infraorder: Brachyura
- Family: Xanthidae
- Subfamily: Xanthinae
- Genus: Paraxanthias; Odhner, 1925

= Paraxanthias =

Genus of crabs

Paraxanthias is a genus of crabs in the family Xanthidae, containing one exclusively fossil species and the following extant species:

- Paraxanthias elegans (Stimpson, 1858)
- Paraxanthias eriphioides (A. Milne-Edwards, 1867)
- Paraxanthias flavescens (Rathbun, 1906)
- Paraxanthias hirtipes (Stimpson, 1871)
- Paraxanthias notatus (Dana, 1852)
- Paraxanthias pachydactylus (A. Milne-Edwards, 1867)
- Paraxanthias parvus (Borradaile, 1900)
- Paraxanthias taylori (Stimpson, 1861)
