= Ovatis =

Scientific classification
- Domain: Eukaryota
- Kingdom: Animalia
- Phylum: Arthropoda
- Class: Malacostraca
- Order: Decapoda
- Suborder: Pleocyemata
- Infraorder: Brachyura
- Family: Xanthidae
- Genus: Ovatis; Ng & Chen, 2004
- Species: O. simplex

Binomial name
- Ovatis simplex Ng & Chen, 2004

Genus of crabs

Ovatis simplex is a species of crabs in the family Xanthidae, the only species in the genus Ovatis.
