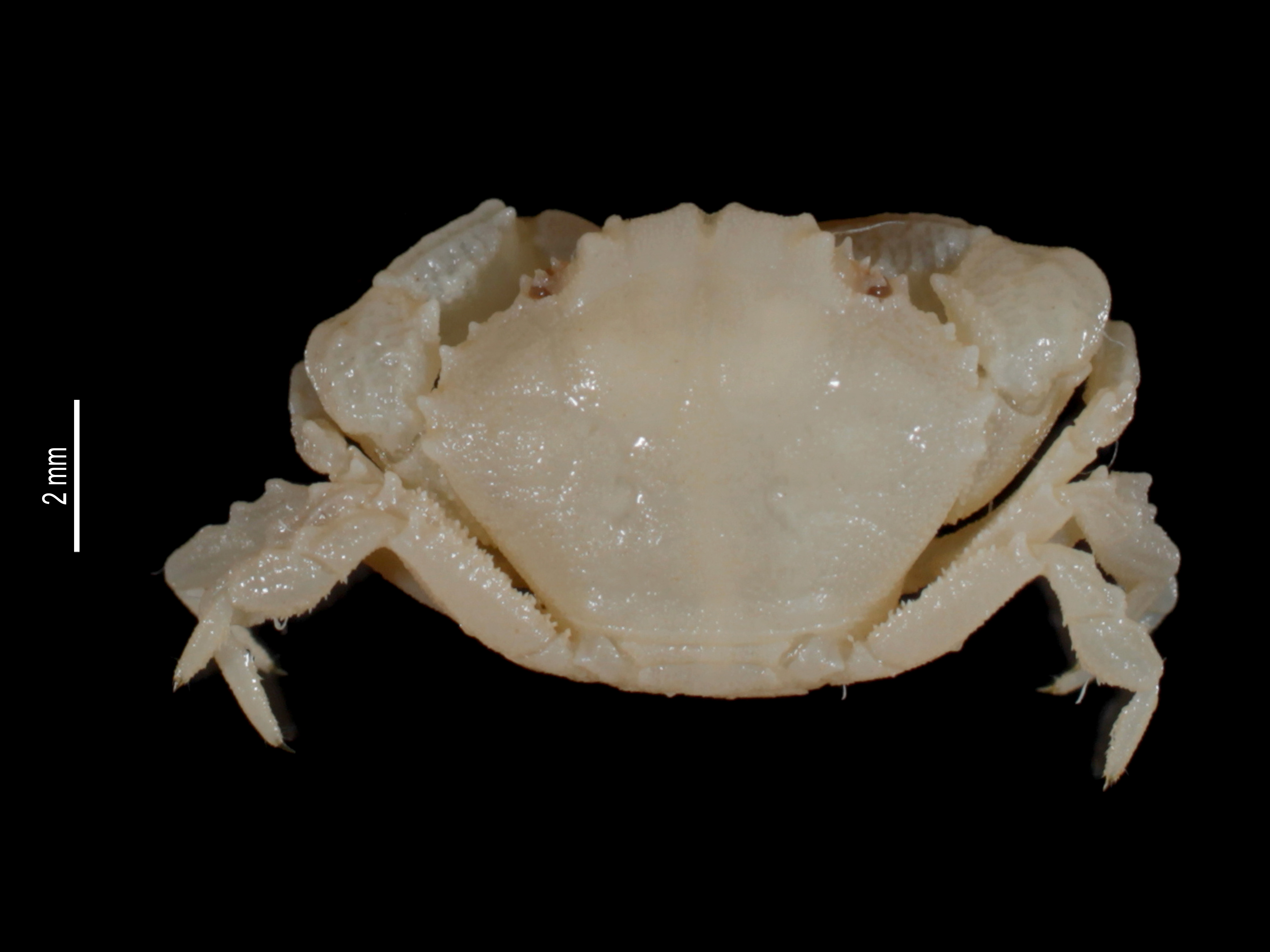
- Paramedaeus megagomphios

Scientific classification
- Domain: Eukaryota
- Kingdom: Animalia
- Phylum: Arthropoda
- Class: Malacostraca
- Order: Decapoda
- Suborder: Pleocyemata
- Infraorder: Brachyura
- Family: Xanthidae
- Subfamily: Euxanthinae
- Genus: Paramedaeus; Guinot, 1967

= Paramedaeus =

Genus of crabs

Paramedaeus is a genus of crabs in the family Xanthidae, containing the following species:

- Paramedaeus globosus Serène & Vadon, 1981
- Paramedaeus megagomphios Davie, 1997
- Paramedaeus octogesimus Ng & Clark, 2002
- Paramedaeus planifrons (Sakai, 1965)
- Paramedaeus simplex (A. Milne-Edwards, 1873)
