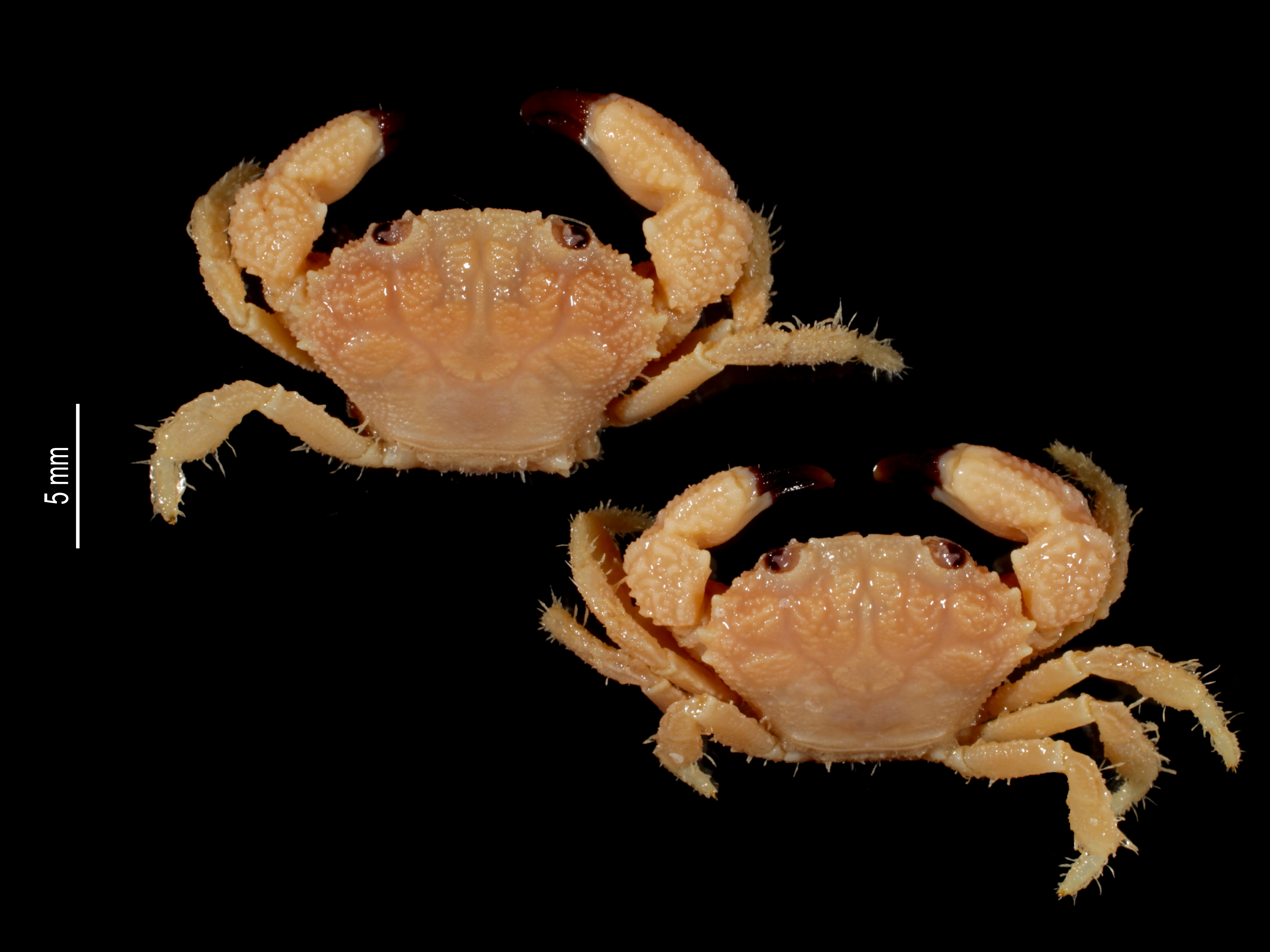
- Monodaeus arnaudi

Scientific classification
- Domain: Eukaryota
- Kingdom: Animalia
- Phylum: Arthropoda
- Class: Malacostraca
- Order: Decapoda
- Suborder: Pleocyemata
- Infraorder: Brachyura
- Family: Xanthidae
- Subfamily: Euxanthinae
- Genus: Monodaeus; Guinot, 1967

= Monodaeus =

Genus of crabs

Monodaeus is a genus of crabs in the family Xanthidae, containing the following species:

- Monodaeus arnaudi Guinot & Macpherson, 1988
- †Monodaeus bortolottii Delle Cave, 1988
- Monodaeus couchii (Couch, 1851)
- Monodaeus cristulatus Guinot & Macpherson, 1988
- Monodaeus pettersoni Garth, 1985
- Monodaeus rectifrons (Crosnier, 1967)
- Monodaeus rouxi (Capart, 1951)
- Monodaeus tuberculidens (Rathbun, 1911)
