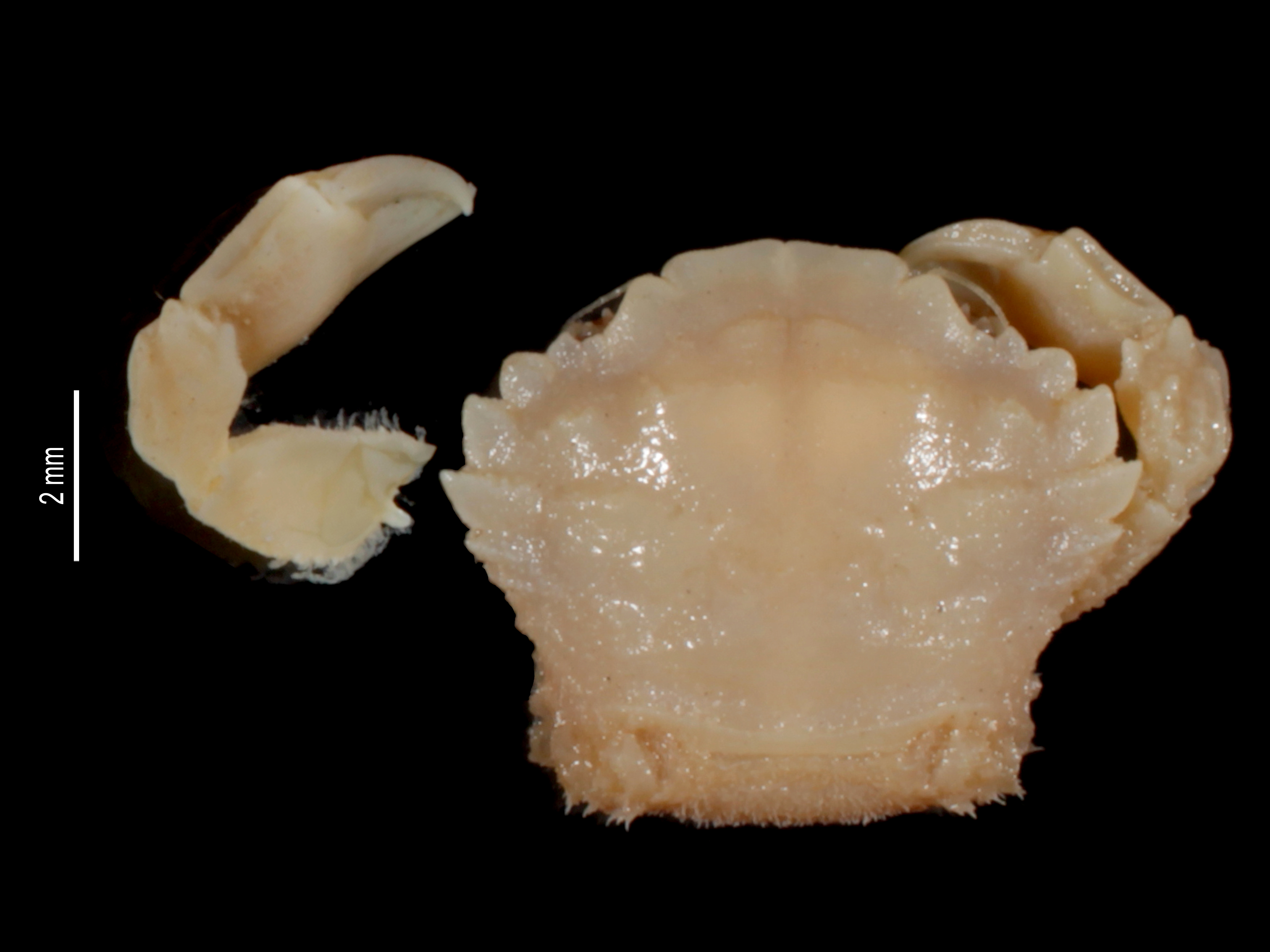
- Metaxanthops acutus

Scientific classification
- Domain: Eukaryota
- Kingdom: Animalia
- Phylum: Arthropoda
- Class: Malacostraca
- Order: Decapoda
- Suborder: Pleocyemata
- Infraorder: Brachyura
- Family: Xanthidae
- Genus: Metaxanthops; Serène, 1984
- Species: M. acutus

Binomial name
- Metaxanthops acutus Serène, 1984

= Metaxanthops =

Genus of crabs

Metaxanthops acutus is a species of crabs in the family Xanthidae, the only species in the genus Metaxanthops.
