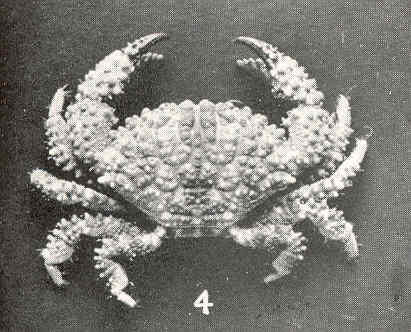
- Epiactaea margaritifera

Scientific classification
- Domain: Eukaryota
- Kingdom: Animalia
- Phylum: Arthropoda
- Class: Malacostraca
- Order: Decapoda
- Suborder: Pleocyemata
- Infraorder: Brachyura
- Family: Xanthidae
- Subfamily: Actaeinae
- Genus: Epiactaea; Serène, 1984

= Epiactaea =

Genus of crabs

Epiactaea is a genus of crabs in the family Xanthidae, containing the following species:

- Epiactaea bullifera (Alcock, 1898)
- Epiactaea margaritifera (Odhner, 1925)
- Epiactaea nodulosa (White, 1848)
