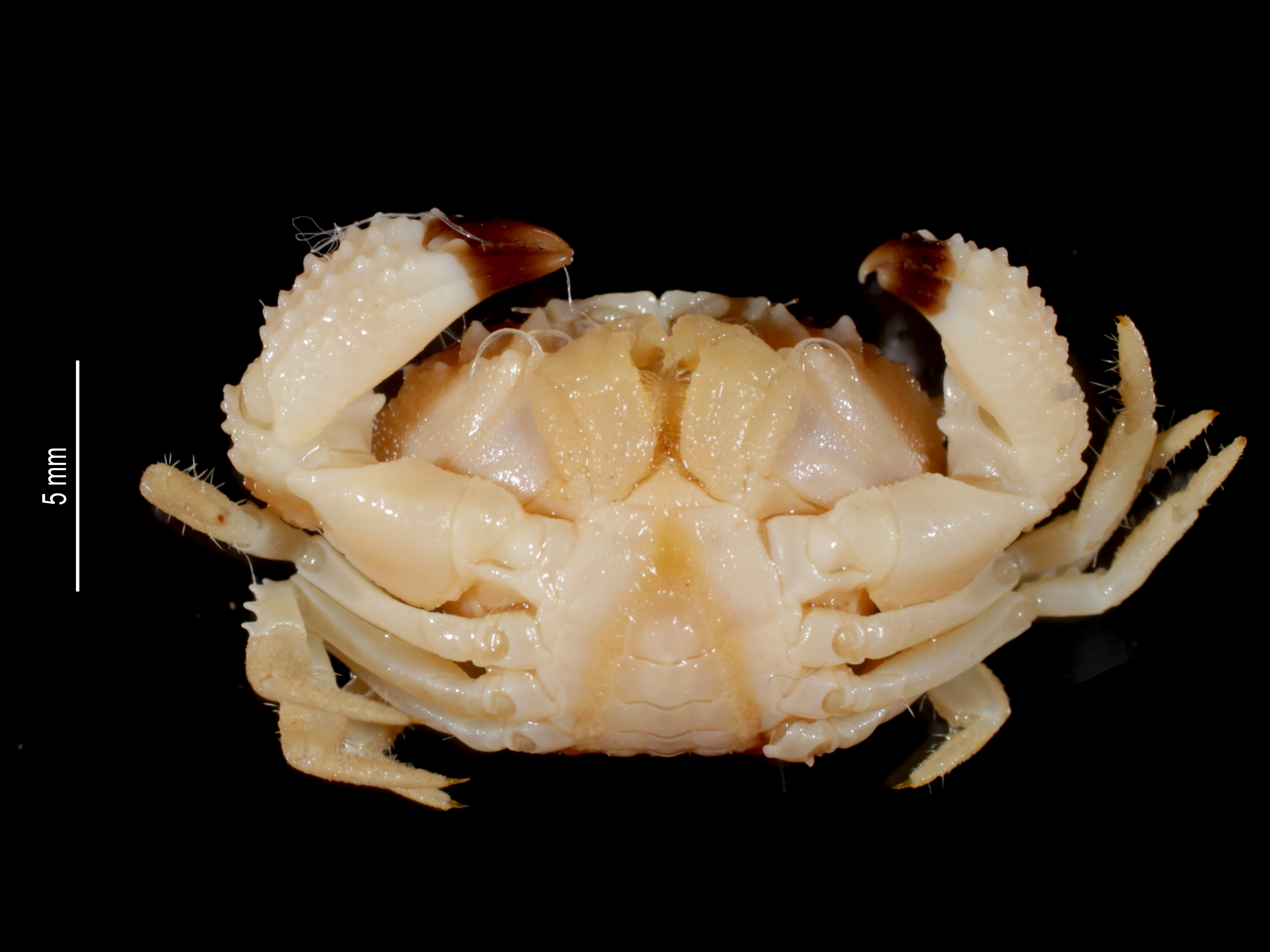

Scientific classification
- Domain: Eukaryota
- Kingdom: Animalia
- Phylum: Arthropoda
- Class: Malacostraca
- Order: Decapoda
- Suborder: Pleocyemata
- Infraorder: Brachyura
- Family: Xanthidae
- Genus: Palatigum; Davie, 1997
- Species: P. trichostoma

Binomial name
- Palatigum trichostoma Davie, 1997

= Palatigum =

Genus of crabs

Palatigum trichostoma is a species of crabs in the family Xanthidae, the only species in the genus Palatigum.
