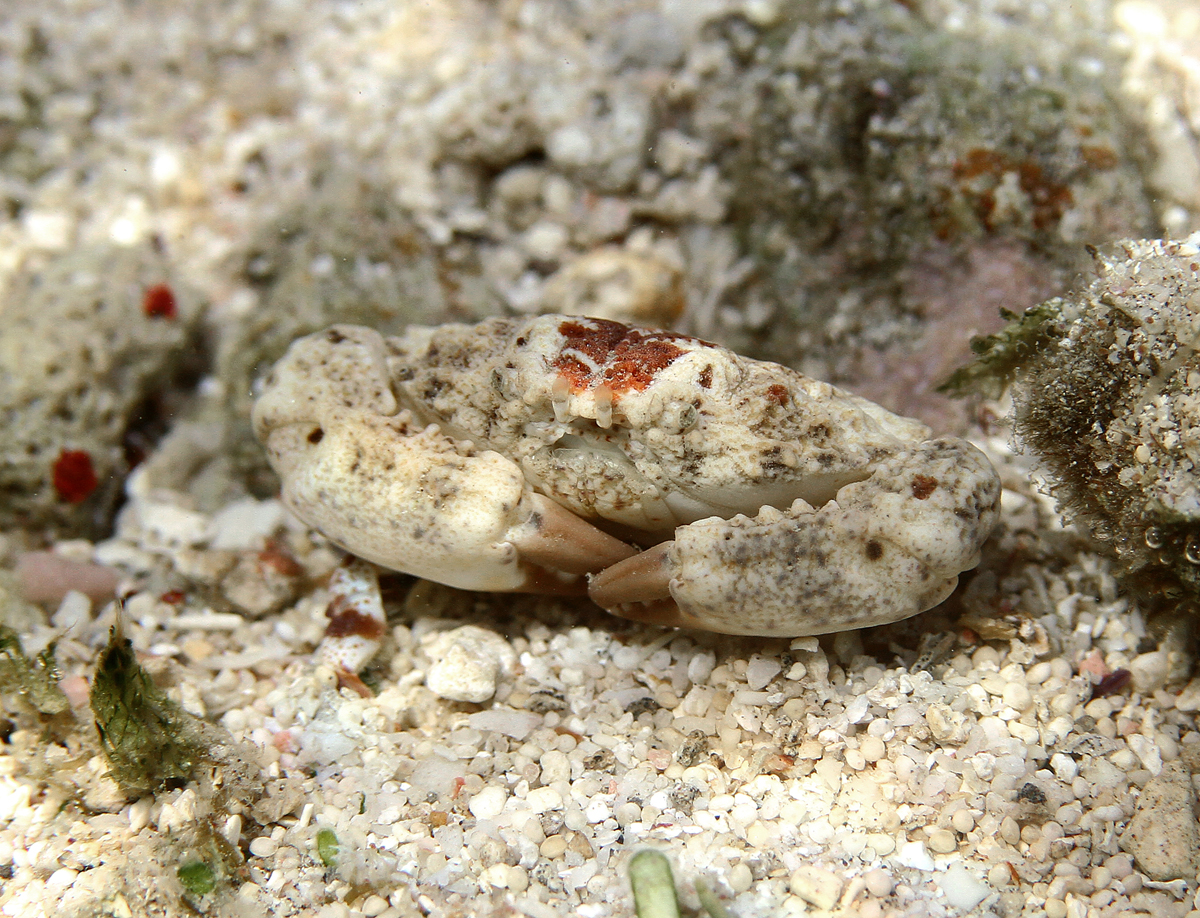
- Macromedaeus nudipes

Scientific classification
- Kingdom: Animalia
- Phylum: Arthropoda
- Class: Malacostraca
- Order: Decapoda
- Suborder: Pleocyemata
- Infraorder: Brachyura
- Family: Xanthidae
- Genus: Macromedaeus; Ward, 1942

= Macromedaeus =

Genus of crabs

Macromedaeus is a genus of crabs in the family Xanthidae, containing the following species:

- Macromedaeus crassimanus (A. Milne-Edwards, 1867)
- Macromedaeus demani (Odhner, 1925)
- Macromedaeus distinguendus (De Haan, 1835)
- Macromedaeus nudipes (A. Milne-Edwards, 1867)
- Macromedaeus quinquedentatus (Krauss, 1843)
- Macromedaeus voeltzkowi (Lenz, 1905)
