= Garthasia =

Scientific classification
- Domain: Eukaryota
- Kingdom: Animalia
- Phylum: Arthropoda
- Class: Malacostraca
- Order: Decapoda
- Suborder: Pleocyemata
- Infraorder: Brachyura
- Family: Xanthidae
- Genus: Garthasia; Ng, 1993
- Species: G. americana

Binomial name
- Garthasia americana (Garth, 1939)

Genus of crabs

Garthasia americana is a species of crabs in the family Xanthidae, the only species in the genus Garthasia.
