= Crosnierius =

Scientific classification
- Domain: Eukaryota
- Kingdom: Animalia
- Phylum: Arthropoda
- Class: Malacostraca
- Order: Decapoda
- Suborder: Pleocyemata
- Infraorder: Brachyura
- Family: Xanthidae
- Subfamily: Euxanthinae
- Genus: Crosnierius; Serene & Vadon, 1981

Genus of crabs

Crosnierius is a genus of crabs in the family Xanthidae, containing the following species:

- Crosnierius carinatus Serene & Vadon, 1981
- Crosnierius gracilipes Ng & Chen, 2005
