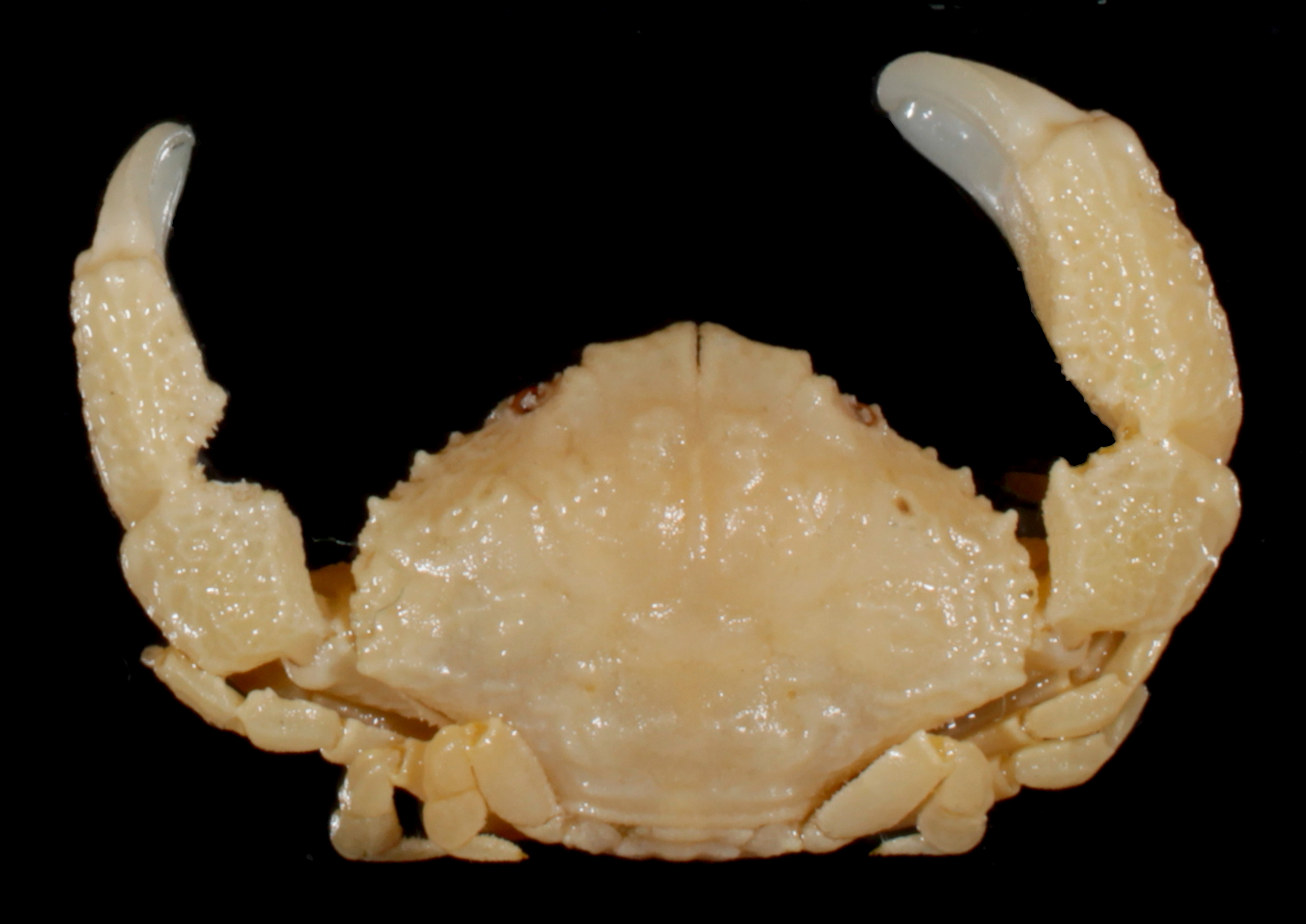

Scientific classification
- Domain: Eukaryota
- Kingdom: Animalia
- Phylum: Arthropoda
- Class: Malacostraca
- Order: Decapoda
- Suborder: Pleocyemata
- Infraorder: Brachyura
- Family: Xanthidae
- Genus: Cranaothus
- Species: C. deforgesi

Binomial name
- Cranaothus deforgesi Ng, 1993

= Cranaothus =

Genus of crabs

Cranaothus deforgesi is a species of crabs in the family Xanthidae, the only species in the genus Cranaothus.
