= Calvactaea =

Scientific classification
- Kingdom: Animalia
- Phylum: Arthropoda
- Class: Malacostraca
- Order: Decapoda
- Suborder: Pleocyemata
- Infraorder: Brachyura
- Family: Xanthidae
- Genus: Calvactaea; Ward, 1933
- Species: C. tumida

Binomial name
- Calvactaea tumida Ward, 1933

Genus of crabs

Calvactaea tumida is a species of crabs in the family Xanthidae, the only species in the genus Calvactaea.

Found primarily off the coast of New South Wales, Australia, as well as, Sri Lanka, China, Taiwan, and Japan.
