= Paractaeopsis =

Scientific classification
- Domain: Eukaryota
- Kingdom: Animalia
- Phylum: Arthropoda
- Class: Malacostraca
- Order: Decapoda
- Suborder: Pleocyemata
- Infraorder: Brachyura
- Family: Xanthidae
- Genus: Paractaeopsis; Serene, 1984
- Species: P. quadriareolata

Binomial name
- Paractaeopsis quadriareolata (Takeda & Miyake, 1968)

Genus of crabs

Paractaeopsis quadriareolata is a species of crabs in the family Xanthidae, the only species in the genus Paractaeopsis.
