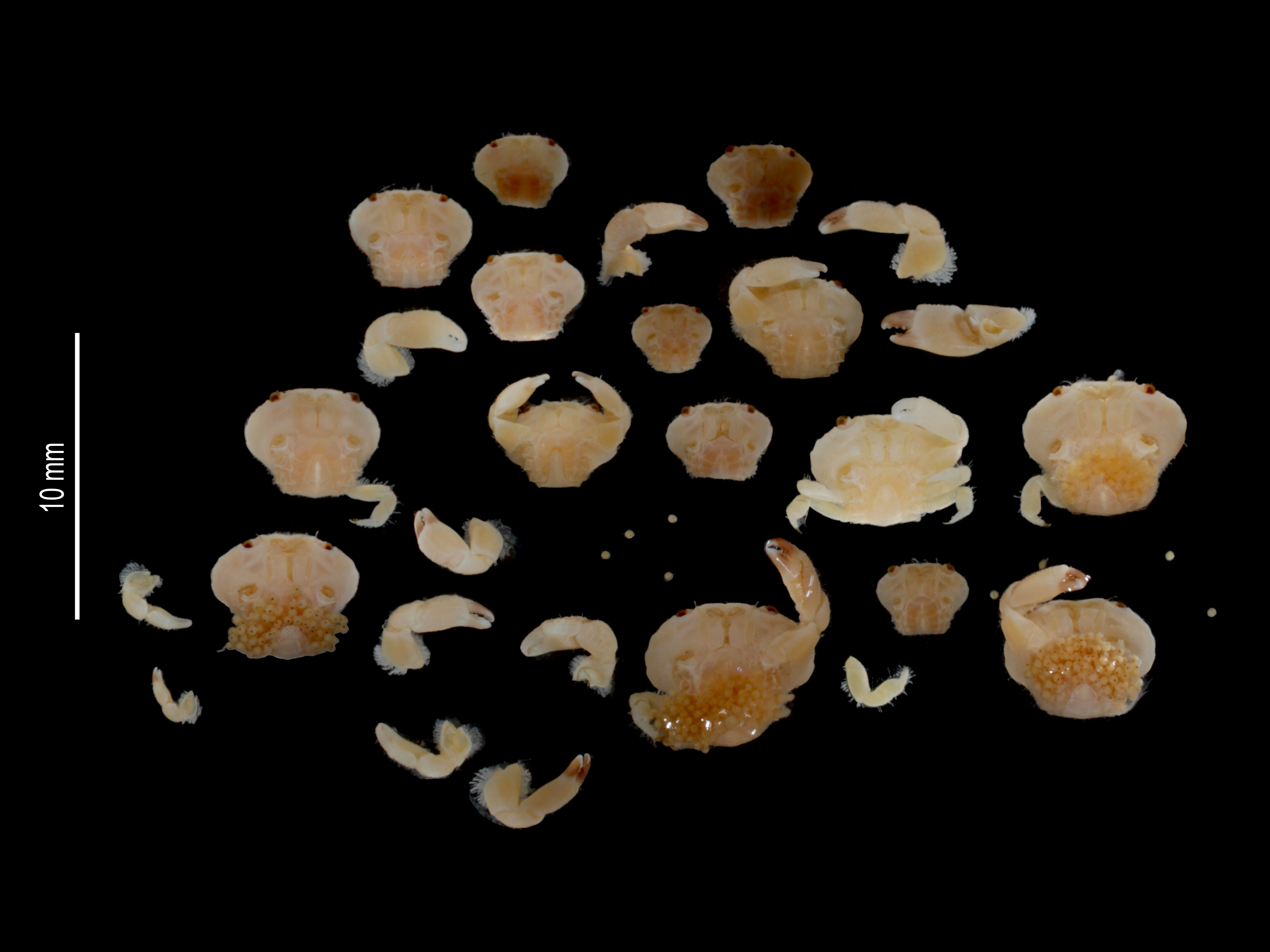
- Cataleptodius olsoni

Scientific classification
- Domain: Eukaryota
- Kingdom: Animalia
- Phylum: Arthropoda
- Class: Malacostraca
- Order: Decapoda
- Suborder: Pleocyemata
- Infraorder: Brachyura
- Family: Xanthidae
- Subfamily: Xanthinae
- Genus: Cataleptodius; Guinot, 1968

Type species
- Chlorodius floridanus Gibbes, 1850

= Cataleptodius =

Genus of crabs

Cataleptodius is a genus of crabs in the family Xanthidae, containing the following species:

- Cataleptodius floridanus (Gibbes, 1850)
- Cataleptodius occidentalis (Stimpson, 1871)
- Cataleptodius snodgrassi (Rathbun, 1902)
- Cataleptodius taboganus (Rathbun, 1912)
