= Visayax =

Scientific classification
- Domain: Eukaryota
- Kingdom: Animalia
- Phylum: Arthropoda
- Class: Malacostraca
- Order: Decapoda
- Suborder: Pleocyemata
- Infraorder: Brachyura
- Family: Xanthidae
- Subfamily: Euxanthinae
- Genus: Visayax; Mendoza & Ng, 2008

Genus of crabs

Visayax is a genus of crabs in the family Xanthidae, containing the following species:

- Visayax estampadori Mendoza & Ng, 2008
- Visayax osteodictyon Mendoza & Ng, 2008
