= Neolioxantho =

Scientific classification
- Domain: Eukaryota
- Kingdom: Animalia
- Phylum: Arthropoda
- Class: Malacostraca
- Order: Decapoda
- Suborder: Pleocyemata
- Infraorder: Brachyura
- Family: Xanthidae
- Subfamily: Xanthinae
- Genus: Neolioxantho; Garth & Kim, 1983

Genus of crabs

Neolioxantho is a genus of crabs in the family Xanthidae, containing the following species:

- Neolioxantho asterodactylus Garth & Kim, 1983
- Neolioxantho latifrons Rathbun, 1911
