= Bruciana =

Scientific classification
- Domain: Eukaryota
- Kingdom: Animalia
- Phylum: Arthropoda
- Class: Malacostraca
- Order: Decapoda
- Suborder: Pleocyemata
- Infraorder: Brachyura
- Family: Xanthidae
- Genus: Bruciana; Serène, 1977
- Species: B. pediger

Binomial name
- Bruciana pediger (Alcock, 1898)

Genus of crabs

Bruciana pediger is a species of crab in the family Xanthidae, the only species in the genus Bruciana.
