= Olenothus =

Scientific classification
- Domain: Eukaryota
- Kingdom: Animalia
- Phylum: Arthropoda
- Class: Malacostraca
- Order: Decapoda
- Suborder: Pleocyemata
- Infraorder: Brachyura
- Family: Xanthidae
- Genus: Olenothus; Ng, 2002
- Species: O. uogi

Binomial name
- Olenothus uogi Ng, 2002

Genus of crabs

Olenothus uogi is a species of crabs in the family Xanthidae, the only species in the genus Olenothus.
