= Lobiactaea =

Scientific classification
- Kingdom: Animalia
- Phylum: Arthropoda
- Class: Malacostraca
- Order: Decapoda
- Suborder: Pleocyemata
- Infraorder: Brachyura
- Family: Xanthidae
- Genus: Lobiactaea; Sakai, 1983
- Species: L. lobipes

Binomial name
- Lobiactaea lobipes (Odhner, 1925)

Genus of crabs

Lobiactaea lobipes is a species of crabs in the family Xanthidae, the only species in the genus Lobiactaea.
