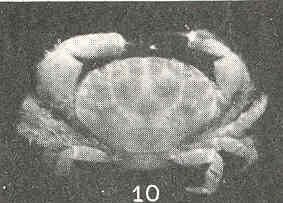
- Xanthodius biunguis, female

Scientific classification
- Kingdom: Animalia
- Phylum: Arthropoda
- Clade: Pancrustacea
- Class: Malacostraca
- Order: Decapoda
- Suborder: Pleocyemata
- Infraorder: Brachyura
- Family: Xanthidae
- Subfamily: Chlorodiellinae
- Genus: Liocarpilodes; Klunzinger, 1913

= Liocarpilodes =

Genus of crabs

Liocarpilodes is a genus of crabs in the family Xanthidae, containing the following species:

- Liocarpilodes armiger (Nobili, 1905)
- Liocarpilodes biunguis (Rathbun, 1906)
- Liocarpilodes harmsi (Balss, 1934)
- Liocarpilodes integerrimus (Dana, 1852)
- Liocarpilodes kauaiensis (Edmondson, 1962)
- Liocarpilodes pacificus Balss, 1938
