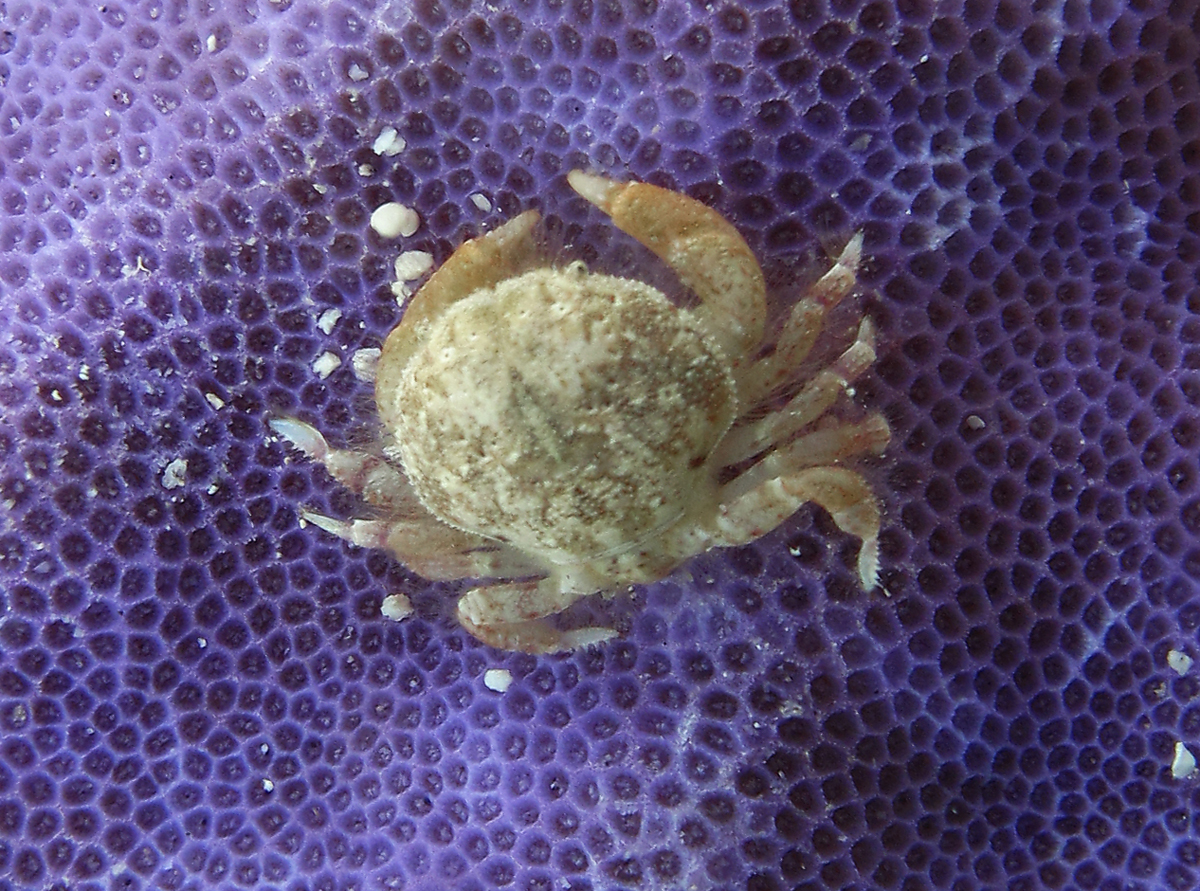
- Palapedia rastripes

Scientific classification
- Kingdom: Animalia
- Phylum: Arthropoda
- Class: Malacostraca
- Order: Decapoda
- Suborder: Pleocyemata
- Infraorder: Brachyura
- Family: Xanthidae
- Genus: Palapedia; Ng, 1993

= Palapedia =

Genus of crabs

Palapedia is a genus of crabs in the family Xanthidae, containing the following species:

- Palapedia apeli Naderloo, 2015
- Palapedia bongensis (Serène, 1972)
- Palapedia hendersoni (Rathbun, 1902)
- Palapedia integra (De Haan, 1835)
- Palapedia marquesa (Serène, 1972)
- Palapedia nitida (Stimpson, 1858)
- Palapedia obliquefrons (Dai, Yang, Song & Chen, 1986)
- Palapedia pelsartensis (Serène, 1972)
- Palapedia quadriceps (Yokoya, 1936)
- Palapedia rastripes (Müller, 1887)
- Palapedia roycei (Serène, 1972)
- Palapedia schubarti Naderloo, 2024
- Palapedia serenei Ng, 1993
- Palapedia truncatifrons (Sakai, 1974)
- Palapedia valentini Ng, 1993
- Palapedia wilsoni (Serène, 1972)
- Palapedia yongshuensis (Dai, Cai & Yang, 1994)
