= Paraetisus =

Scientific classification
- Kingdom: Animalia
- Phylum: Arthropoda
- Class: Malacostraca
- Order: Decapoda
- Suborder: Pleocyemata
- Infraorder: Brachyura
- Family: Xanthidae
- Genus: Paraetisus; Ward, 1933
- Species: P. globulus

Binomial name
- Paraetisus globulus Ward, 1933

Genus of crabs

Paraetisus globulus is a species of crab in the family Xanthidae, the only species in the genus Paraetisus. It was described in 1933 by Charles Melbourne Ward.
