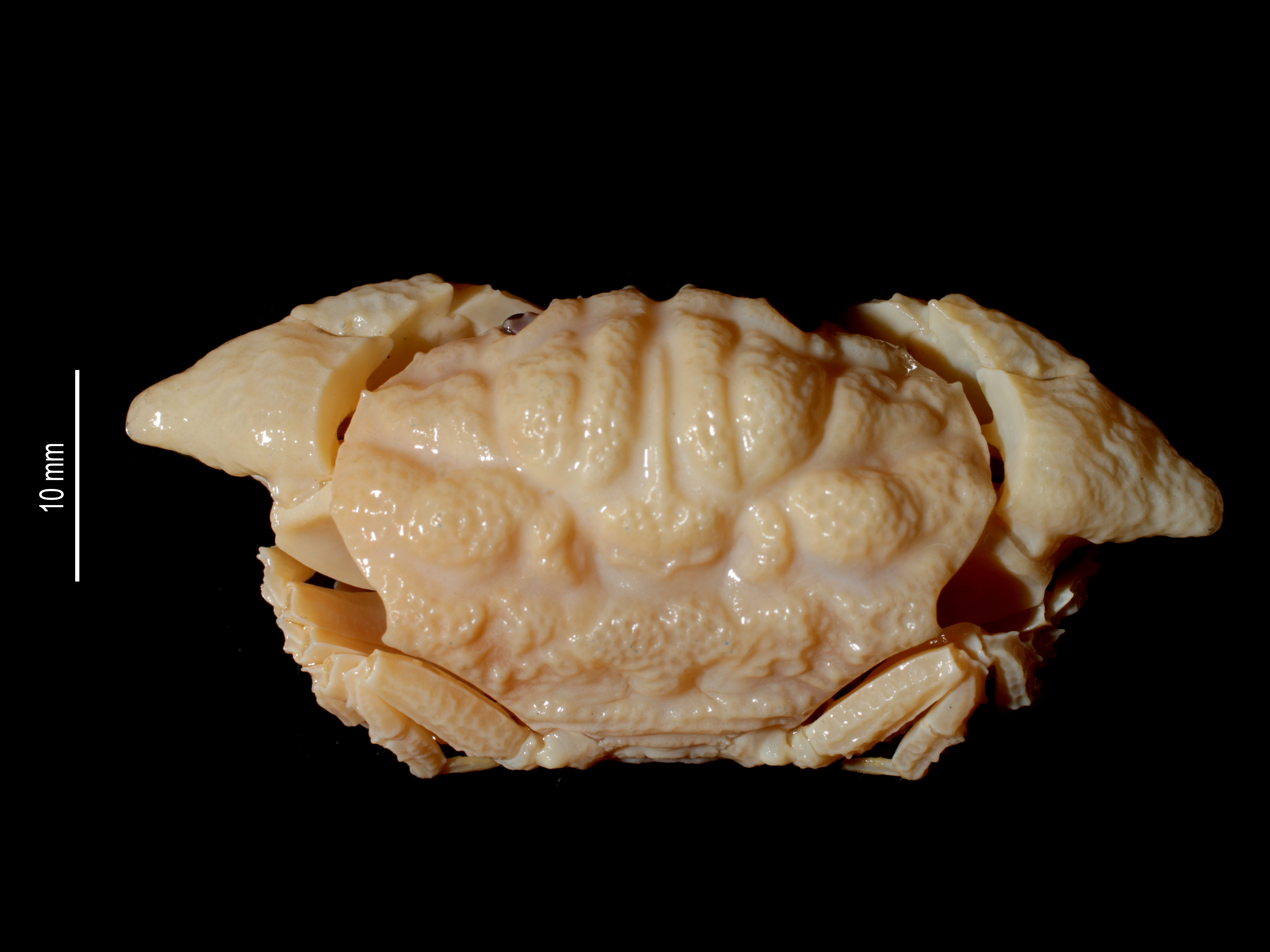

Scientific classification
- Domain: Eukaryota
- Kingdom: Animalia
- Phylum: Arthropoda
- Class: Malacostraca
- Order: Decapoda
- Suborder: Pleocyemata
- Infraorder: Brachyura
- Family: Xanthidae
- Genus: Pleurocolpus
- Species: P. boileaui

Binomial name
- Pleurocolpus boileaui Crosnier, 1995

= Pleurocolpus =

Genus of crabs

Pleurocolpus boileaui is a species of crabs in the family Xanthidae, the only species in the genus Pleurocolpus.
