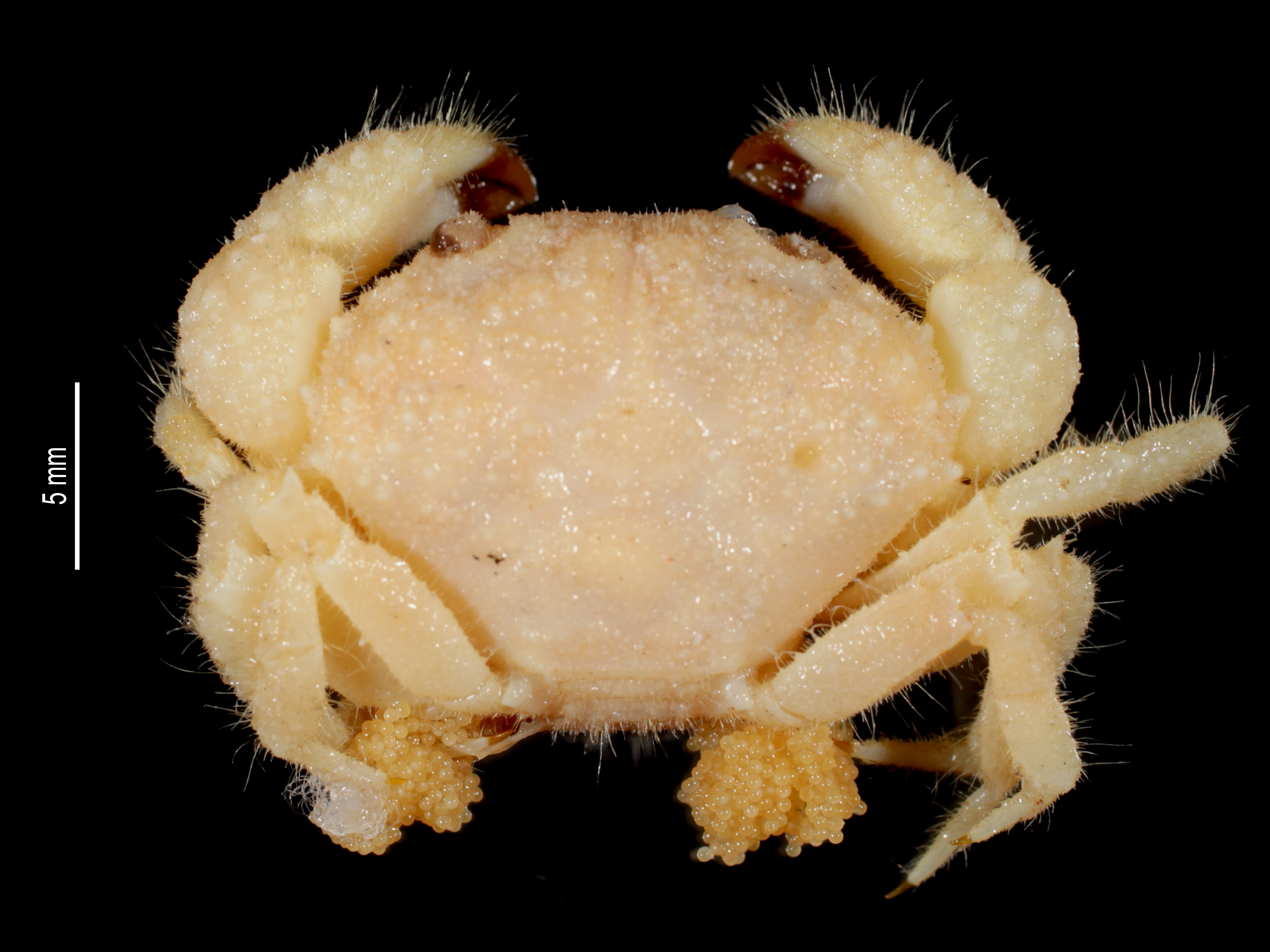
- Rata tuamotense

Scientific classification
- Domain: Eukaryota
- Kingdom: Animalia
- Phylum: Arthropoda
- Class: Malacostraca
- Order: Decapoda
- Suborder: Pleocyemata
- Infraorder: Brachyura
- Family: Xanthidae
- Subfamily: Actaeinae
- Genus: Rata; Davie, 1993

= Rata (crab) =

Genus of crabs

Rata is a genus of crabs in the family Xanthidae, containing the following species:

- Rata chalcal Davie, 1997
- Rata tuamotense Davie, 1993
