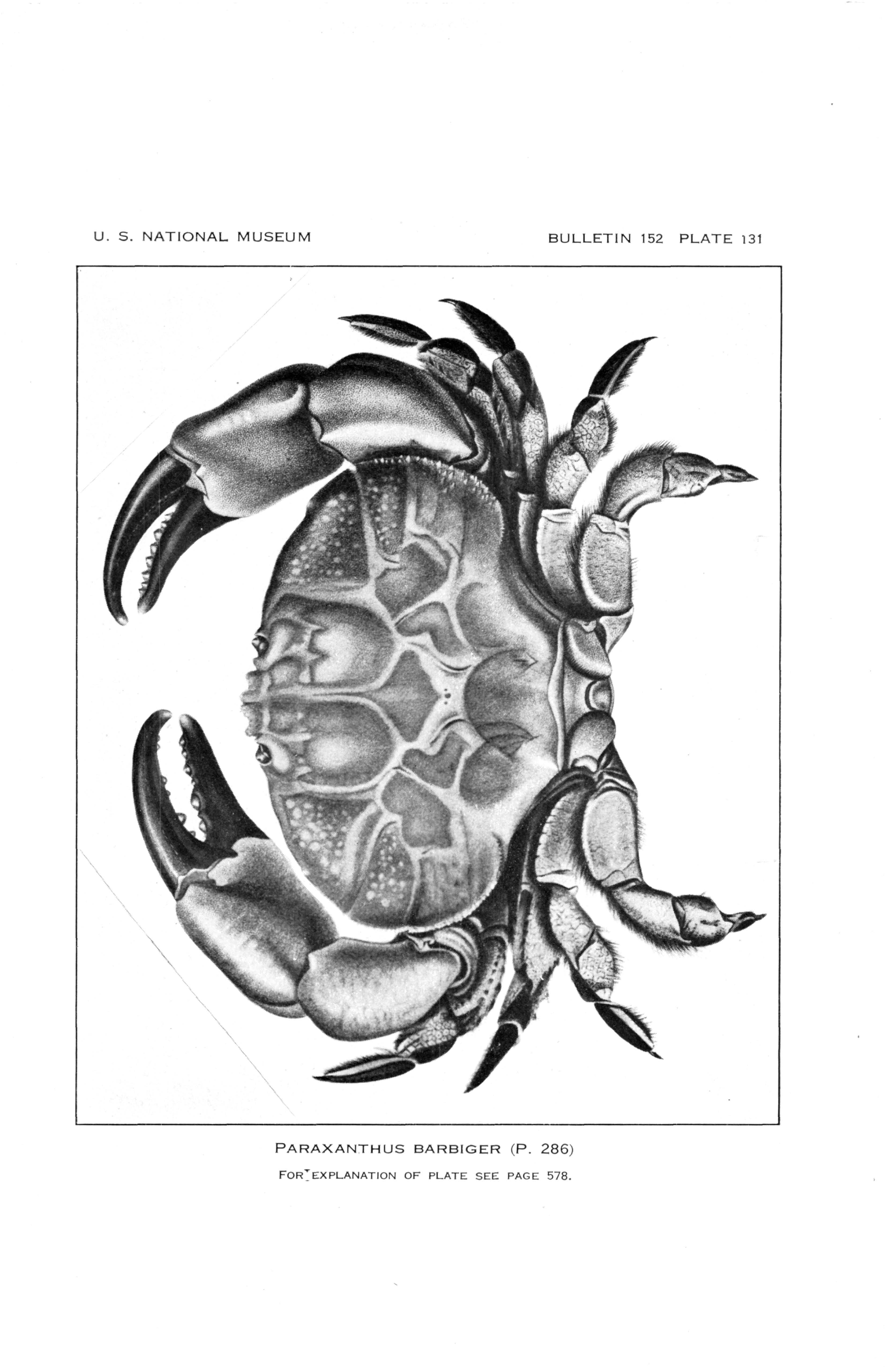

Scientific classification
- Kingdom: Animalia
- Phylum: Arthropoda
- Class: Malacostraca
- Order: Decapoda
- Suborder: Pleocyemata
- Infraorder: Brachyura
- Family: Xanthidae
- Genus: Paraxanthus; Lucas, 1844
- Species: P. barbiger

Binomial name
- Paraxanthus barbiger Lucas, 1844

Synonyms
- Gecarcinus barbiger Poeppig, 1836; Paraxanthus hirtipes Lucas in H. Milne Edwards & Lucas, 1844

= Paraxanthus =

Paraxanthus barbiger

Genus of crabs

Paraxanthus barbiger is a species of crabs in the family Xanthidae, the only species in the genus Paraxanthus.
