= Sulcodius =

Scientific classification
- Domain: Eukaryota
- Kingdom: Animalia
- Phylum: Arthropoda
- Class: Malacostraca
- Order: Decapoda
- Suborder: Pleocyemata
- Infraorder: Brachyura
- Family: Xanthidae
- Genus: Sulcodius
- Species: S. deflexus

Binomial name
- Sulcodius deflexus (Dana, 1852)

Genus of crabs

Sulcodius deflexus is a species of crabs in the family Xanthidae, the only species in the genus Sulcodius.
