= Guitonia =

Scientific classification
- Domain: Eukaryota
- Kingdom: Animalia
- Phylum: Arthropoda
- Class: Malacostraca
- Order: Decapoda
- Suborder: Pleocyemata
- Infraorder: Brachyura
- Family: Xanthidae
- Genus: Guitonia; Garth & Iliffe, 1992
- Species: G. troglophila

Binomial name
- Guitonia troglophila Garth & Iliffe, 1992

Genus of crabs

Guitonia troglophila is a species of crabs in the family Xanthidae, the only species in the genus Guitonia.
