= Neoxanthops =

Scientific classification
- Domain: Eukaryota
- Kingdom: Animalia
- Phylum: Arthropoda
- Class: Malacostraca
- Order: Decapoda
- Suborder: Pleocyemata
- Infraorder: Brachyura
- Family: Xanthidae
- Genus: Neoxanthops; Guinot, 1968

Genus of crabs

Neoxanthops is a genus of crabs in the family Xanthidae, containing the following species:

- Neoxanthops bocki (Garth, 1957)
- Neoxanthops lineatus (A. Milne-Edwards, 1867)
- Neoxanthops quadrilobatus (Sakai, 1939)
- Neoxanthops rotundus Guinot, 1968
