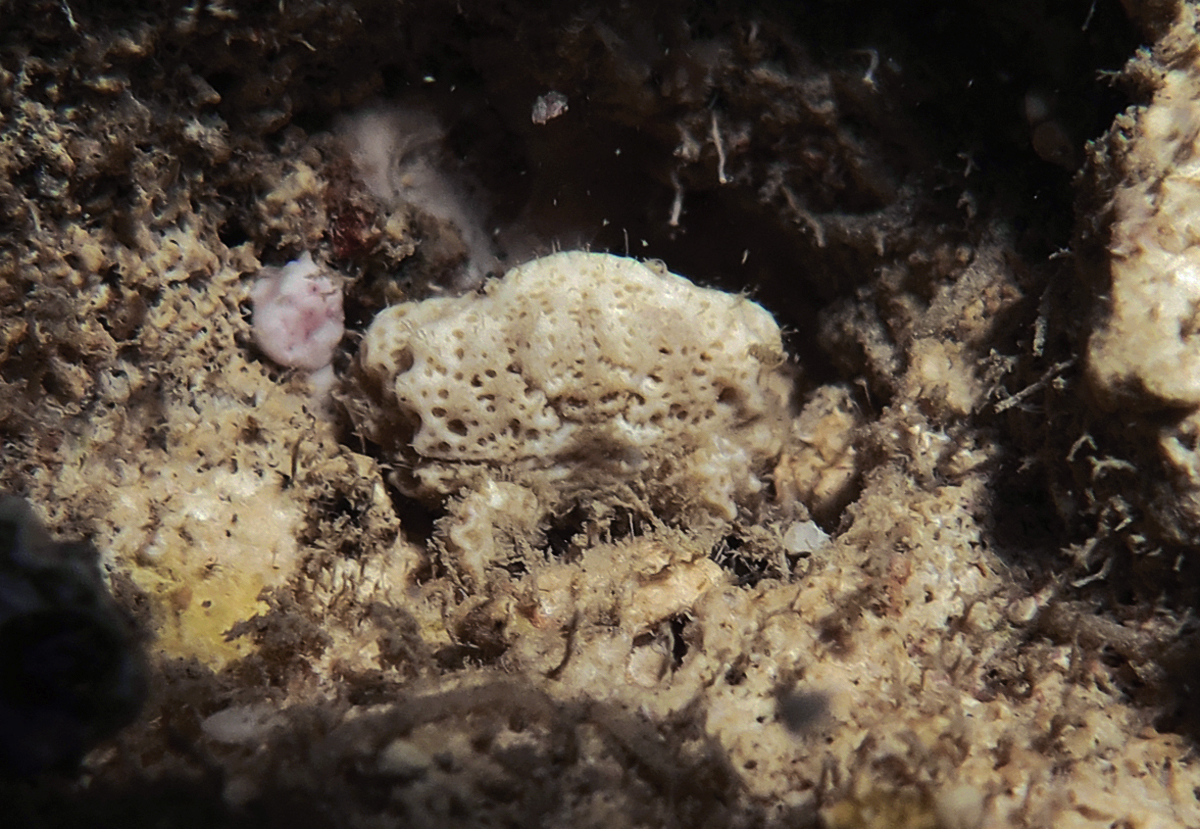
- Psaumis cavipes

Scientific classification
- Domain: Eukaryota
- Kingdom: Animalia
- Phylum: Arthropoda
- Class: Malacostraca
- Order: Decapoda
- Suborder: Pleocyemata
- Infraorder: Brachyura
- Family: Xanthidae
- Genus: Psaumis; Kossmann, 1877

= Psaumis =

Genus of crabs

Psaumis is a genus of crabs in the family Xanthidae, containing the following species:

- Psaumis cavipes (Dana, 1852)
- Psaumis fossulata (Girard, 1859)
