= Coralliope =

Scientific classification
- Domain: Eukaryota
- Kingdom: Animalia
- Phylum: Arthropoda
- Class: Malacostraca
- Order: Decapoda
- Suborder: Pleocyemata
- Infraorder: Brachyura
- Family: Xanthidae
- Subfamily: Xanthinae
- Genus: Coralliope; Guinot, 1967

Genus of crabs

Coralliope is a genus of crabs in the family Xanthidae, containing the following species:

- Coralliope armstrongi (Garth, 1948)
- Coralliope parvula (A. Milne Edwards, 1869)
