= Megametope =

Scientific classification
- Domain: Eukaryota
- Kingdom: Animalia
- Phylum: Arthropoda
- Class: Malacostraca
- Order: Decapoda
- Suborder: Pleocyemata
- Infraorder: Brachyura
- Family: Xanthidae
- Subfamily: Xanthinae
- Genus: Megametope; Filhol, 1885

Genus of crabs

Megametope is a genus of crabs in the family Xanthidae, containing the following species:

- Megametope carinatus Baker, 1907
- Megametope ogaensis Sakai, 1974
- Megametope punctatus (Haswell, 1882)
- Megametope rotundifrons (H. Milne Edwards, 1834)
