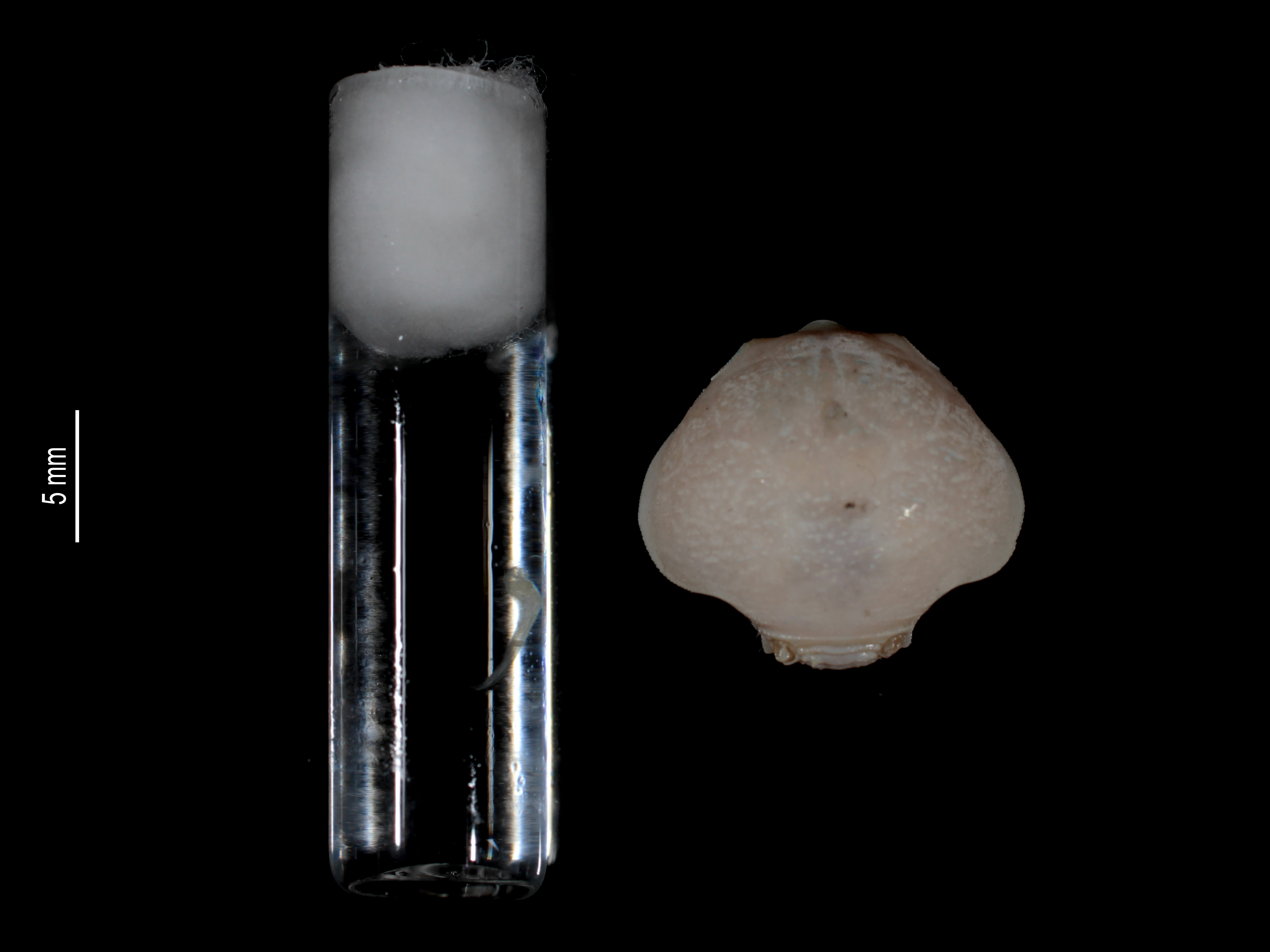

Scientific classification
- Kingdom: Animalia
- Phylum: Arthropoda
- Clade: Pancrustacea
- Class: Malacostraca
- Order: Decapoda
- Suborder: Pleocyemata
- Infraorder: Brachyura
- Family: Xanthidae
- Subfamily: Euxanthinae
- Genus: Guinotellus; Serene, 1971
- Species: G. melvillensis

Binomial name
- Guinotellus melvillensis Serene, 1971

= Guinotellus =

Genus of crabs

Guinotellus melvillensis is a species of crabs in the family Xanthidae, the only species in the genus Guinotellus. It is a benthic crab with an ovate carapace within the subfamily Euxanthinae.

Guinotellus melvillensis is a rare and unusual species of crab that has only been recorded in the Western Central Pacific, more specifically the Philippines. This species comes from the Xanthidae family (which comprises the common mud crabs), in the genus Guinotellus. G. melvillensis is the only crab of this family within the genus.

They have been found in four locations all within the Philippines and at varying depths at each location, with some specimens being found in the intertidal as well as subtidal microhabitats.

== Description ==
The most distinctive feature of G. melvillensis is its oval-shaped carapace and shallow sub-hepatic cavities. Its carapace is broader than it is long, with a ratio of roughly 1:1.2, and it lacks distinction between different regions. The sub-hepatic cavities (or cavities beneath the liver) are not unique to this genus, though they are distinctively shallow and are divided by a prominent crest, with crests along their sides as well.

This crest is thought to work in conjunction with another unique feature, which is its modified claw. This claw has a modified upper arm portion, or merus, being significantly reduced. This reduced appendage is closely aligned with its first and longest leg, with the two being coapted. The purpose of this modification is currently unknown.

Their size ranges from 2.0 to 200 mm, with juveniles tending to have a smaller carapace width to length ratio. This species also has a distinctive gastrointestinal tract, with its dorsal lobe uniquely terminating in a hook shape; this is dissimilar to other Euxanthids, but is reminiscent of other crabs in its family, Xanthidae. It also lacks an external tooth.

It is distinctive from other euxanthines due to its unusually shaped carapace. Despite this, it is visually similar to other members of the subfamily Euxanthidae, such as Hypocolpus, Carpoporus, and Hepatoporus, with a notable resemblance to Hypocolpus due to the presence of subhepatic cavities. The two are distinguishable by the ratio of the carapace width and length, with it being 1:1.3+ in Hypocolpus and roughly 1:1.2 in G. melvillensis, as well as by this species’s distinctive gastrointestinal tract.

There is notable sexual dimorphism, with females having a less broad carapace, smaller claws, and a distinctive vulva.

Its coloration is undocumented, but it is assumed to be colorful like other xanthids.

Guinotellus melvillensis has an anterolateral margin that does not meet the orbital margin but continues to meet antero-external region of the buccal frame. It also has a distinct subhepatic cavities present, with the chelipeds and walking legs that can be neatly fastened together against the carpus, which are ovoid and smooth.

As there is limited research on this species the morphology can be described having the morphology being the most similar to species of hypocolpus. Which can be found in reef prairies of Thalassodendron.

They are especially similar in the structure of the basal antennal article, the anterior portion of the sternum, the form of the male abdomen, the cristate anterolateral margin of the carapace, and the way the fingers, palm, and carpus of the chelae follow the curve of the body surface against which they are fastened together.

== Life history ==
Guinotellus melvillensis are commonly found with the benthic and tropical zones of the ocean. They are members of order Decapoda and are mostly gonochoric.

=== Habitat ===
This benthic species has been documented in four locations within the Philippines thus far, including Balabac Island, Sibutu Island, Putic Island, and southern Luzon. This area is known for being particularly dense in marine fauna, with many other species belonging to the infraorder Brachyura residing there. Adult Xanthids are generally found in shallow water, and as such, the known G. melvillensis specimens were collected between depths of 2 to 73 meters. The areas in which they have been found contain coral reefs with large seaweed expanses, residing specifically within coral or on reef flats. This species is postulated to live in subtidal and intertidal zones.

=== Mating ===
The reproductive behaviors of this species are not well documented, but based upon members of its order, Decapoda, they have separate male and female individuals that engage in courting behaviors. Copulation is only possible soon after the female molts, at which point the crabs mate via indirect sperm transfer.

=== Movement ===
The movement of these creatures is based on the walking legs that they possess. These walking legs densely setose at margins, less so on dorsal and ventral surfaces. They are relatively short, with their first walking legs being the longest.

=== Larval stages ===
Although G. melvillensis has only been found in the Philippines, its larval stages can be compared to that of the family Xanthidae that it is a part of. The crab goes through 5 stages, four zoeal stages and a megalopa stage to end their larval life to enter into the adult stage. During this larval period, they are notably pelagic.

=== Diet ===
The diet of G. melvillensis is somewhat unknown but from information taken from the family Xanthidae it can be suggested. Crustaceans are described as opportunistic omnivores as they utilise different types of food. However, most crustaceans are mainly omnivores with a tendency for herbivory in food habitats. For the P. vespertilio, a crustacean in the family Xanthidae similar to G. melvillensis, the most important food source was algae which was obtained by scrubbing the encrusted coralline substratum, with red algae (Rhodophyta) being the most common species to be consumed. The P. verspertilio also feeds on brittle stars, gastropods and bivalves, which displays the range of food sources that the family Xanthidae can consume. It is possible that, like other Xanthids, it contains toxins as a result of its diet, and is thus poisonous.

== Classification history ==
The genus and species were first described by Raoul Serène (1909-1980) in 1971, initially identified by a single juvenile male. At least 13 additional organisms have been reidentified as G. melvillensis from museum collections in the National Museum of the Philippines and the Museum national d'Histoire naturelle. They were initially placed solely into the family Xanthidae in 1971, but were later revised to be added to the subfamily Euxanthidae in 1984.

== Bibliography ==
- Peter K. L. Ng; Danièle Guinot & Peter J. F. Davie (2008). "Systema Brachyurorum: Part I. An annotated checklist of extant Brachyuran crabs of the world" (PDF). Raffles Bulletin of Zoology. 17: 1–286.
- "WoRMS - World Register of Marine Species - Guinotellus melvillensis Serène, 1971". www.marinespecies.org. Retrieved 2022-04-25.
- Vannini, Marco (1982). "Notes On Somalian Species of the Genus Hypocolpus (Decapoda, Brachyura, Xanthidae) With the Description of a New Species1)". Crustaceana. 42 (1–2): 101–105. doi:10.1163/156854082x00740. ISSN 0011-216X.
- "Crab Database · Crabs · Species Guinotellus melvillensis". www.crabdatabase.info. Retrieved 2022-04-25.
- Mendoza, Jose C. E.; Manuel-Santos, Marivene R.; Ng, Peter K. L. (2009). "Rediscovery of the rare euxanthine crab, Guinotellus melvillensis Serène, 1971 (Decapoda, Brachyura, Xanthidae) in the Philippines". Crustaceana. 82 (1): 39–51. ISSN 0011-216X.
- "Guinotellus melvillensis". www.sealifebase.ca. Retrieved 2022-04-25.
- Tan, Leo W.H.; Lim, Shirley S.L. (1981). "Larval Development of the Hairy Crab, Pilumnus Vespertilio (Fabricius) (Brachyura, Xanthidae) in the Laboratory and Comparisons With Larvae of Pil Umnus Dasypodus Kingsley and Pilumnussa Yi Rathbun". Crustaceana. 41(1): 71–88. doi:10.1163/156854081x00093. ISSN 0011-216X.
- Kyomo, Joel (2002). "Timing and Synchronization of the Breeding Period in Pilumnus vespertilio (Crustacea: Pilumnidae) in Subtropical Okinawa, Japan". Pacific Science. 56 (3): 317–328. doi:10.1353/psc.2002.0025. ISSN 1534-6188.
