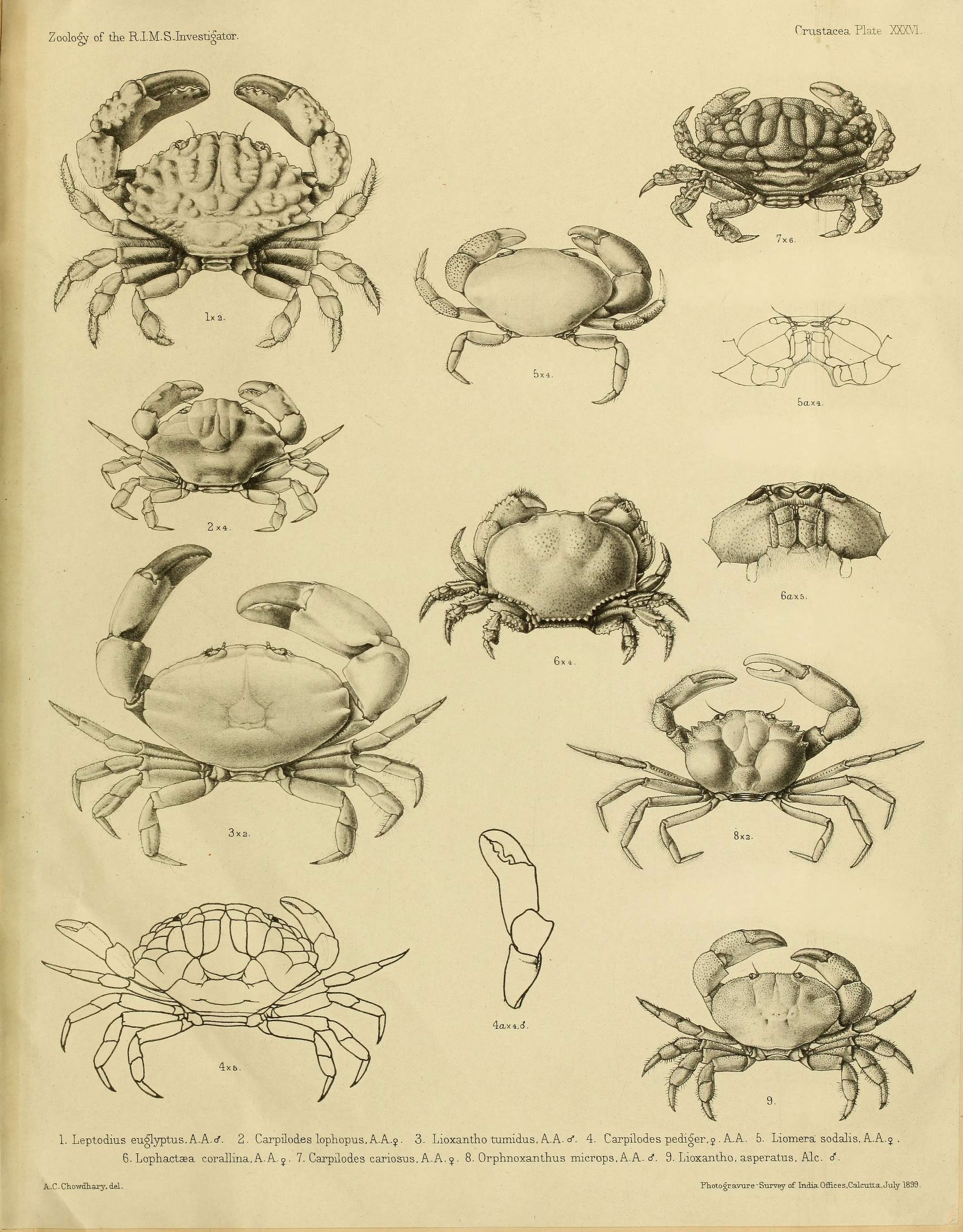
- Orphnoxanthus microps is seen middle bottom right

Scientific classification
- Kingdom: Animalia
- Phylum: Arthropoda
- Class: Malacostraca
- Order: Decapoda
- Suborder: Pleocyemata
- Infraorder: Brachyura
- Family: Xanthidae
- Genus: Orphnoxanthus; Alcock, 1898
- Species: O. microps

Binomial name
- Orphnoxanthus microps (Alcock & Anderson, 1894)

= Orphnoxanthus =

Genus of crabs

Orphnoxanthus microps is a species of crabs in the family Xanthidae, the only species in the genus Orphnoxanthus.
