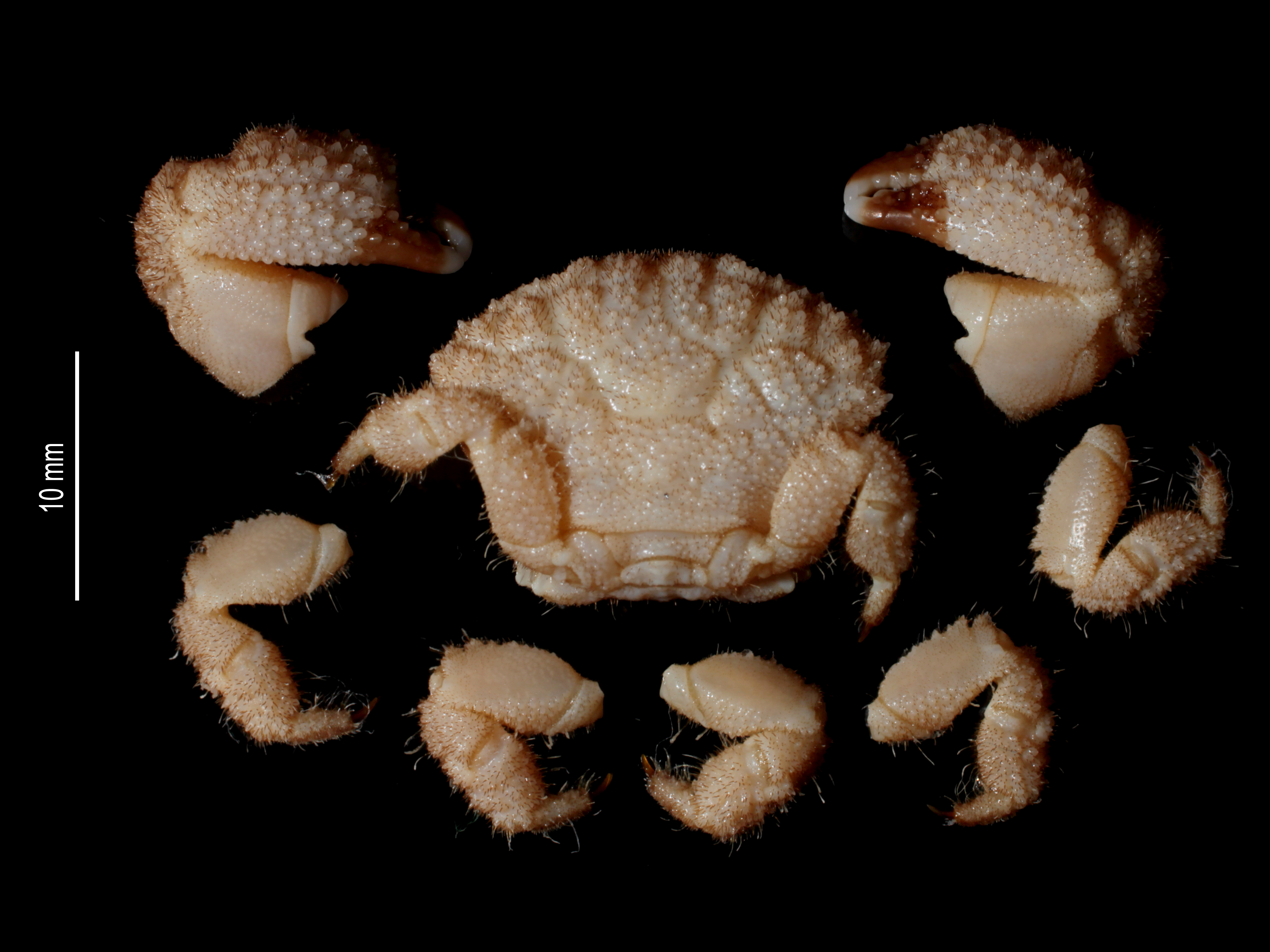
- Novactaea bella

Scientific classification
- Domain: Eukaryota
- Kingdom: Animalia
- Phylum: Arthropoda
- Class: Malacostraca
- Order: Decapoda
- Suborder: Pleocyemata
- Infraorder: Brachyura
- Family: Xanthidae
- Genus: Novactaea; Guinot, 1976

= Novactaea =

Genus of crabs

Novactaea is a genus of crabs in the family Xanthidae, containing the following species:

- Novactaea bella Guinot, 1976
- Novactaea michaelseni (Odhner, 1925)
- Novactaea modesta (De Man, 1888)
- Novactaea pulchella (A. Milne-Edwards, 1865)
