= Paratergatis =

Scientific classification
- Domain: Eukaryota
- Kingdom: Animalia
- Phylum: Arthropoda
- Class: Malacostraca
- Order: Decapoda
- Suborder: Pleocyemata
- Infraorder: Brachyura
- Family: Xanthidae
- Genus: Paratergatis; Sakai, 1965
- Species: P. longimanus

Binomial name
- Paratergatis longimanus Sakai, 1965

Genus of crabs

Paratergatis longimanus is a species of crabs in the family Xanthidae, the only species in the genus Paratergatis.
