= Pseudactaea =

Scientific classification
- Domain: Eukaryota
- Kingdom: Animalia
- Phylum: Arthropoda
- Class: Malacostraca
- Order: Decapoda
- Suborder: Pleocyemata
- Infraorder: Brachyura
- Family: Xanthidae
- Subfamily: Banareiinae
- Genus: Pseudactaea; Guinot, 1971

Genus of crabs

Pseudactaea is a genus of crabs in the family Xanthidae, containing the following species:

- Pseudactaea corallina (Alcock, 1898)
- Pseudactaea multiareolata Takeda & Marumura, 2002
- Pseudactaea multicristata (Zehntner, 1894)
