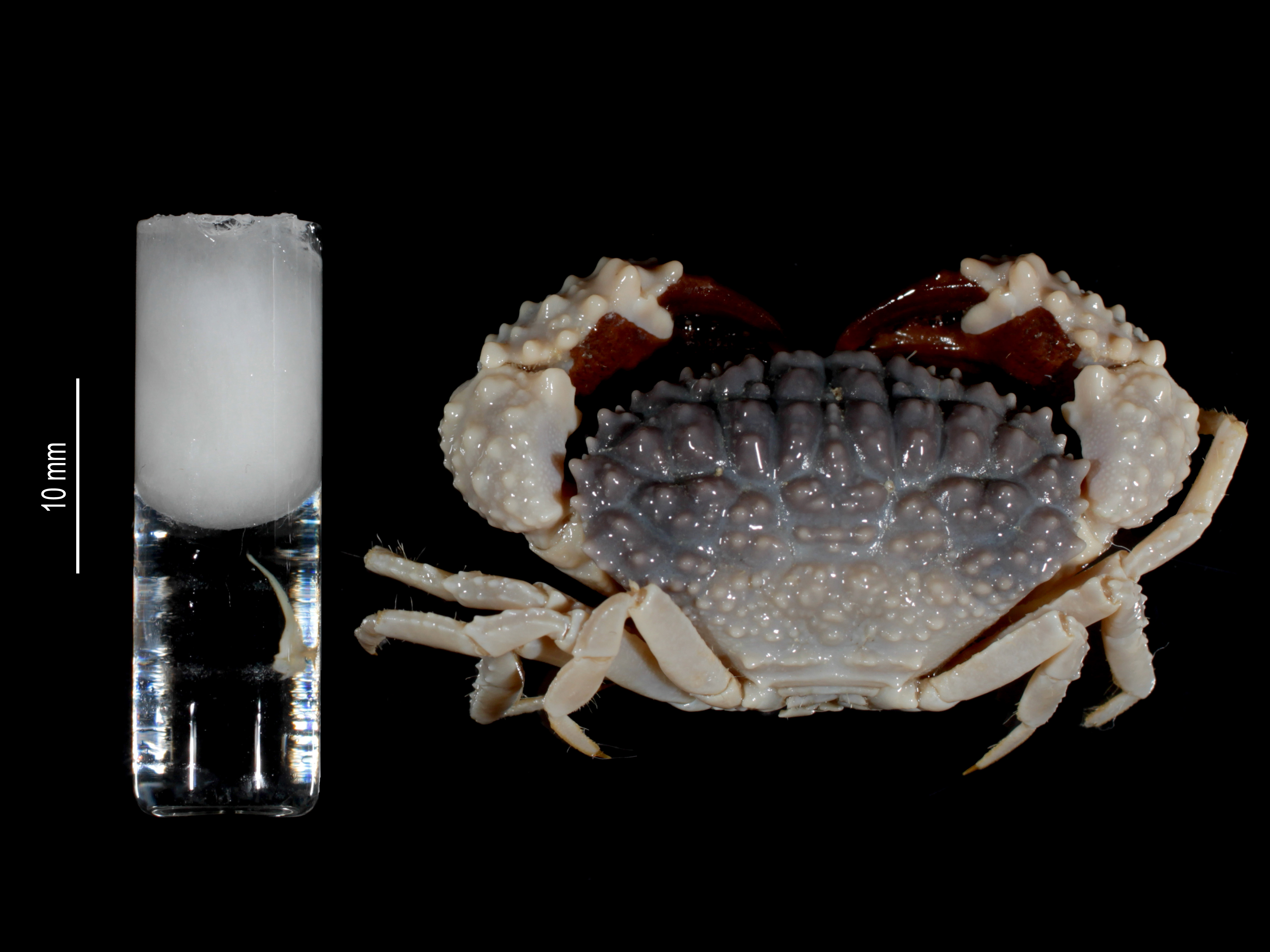
- Meractaea multidentata

Scientific classification
- Domain: Eukaryota
- Kingdom: Animalia
- Phylum: Arthropoda
- Class: Malacostraca
- Order: Decapoda
- Suborder: Pleocyemata
- Infraorder: Brachyura
- Family: Xanthidae
- Genus: Meractaea; Serene, 1984

= Meractaea =

Genus of crabs

Meractaea is a genus of crabs in the family Xanthidae, containing the following species:

- Meractaea brucei Serene, 1984
- Meractaea multidentata Davie, 1997
- Meractaea tafai Davie, 1992
