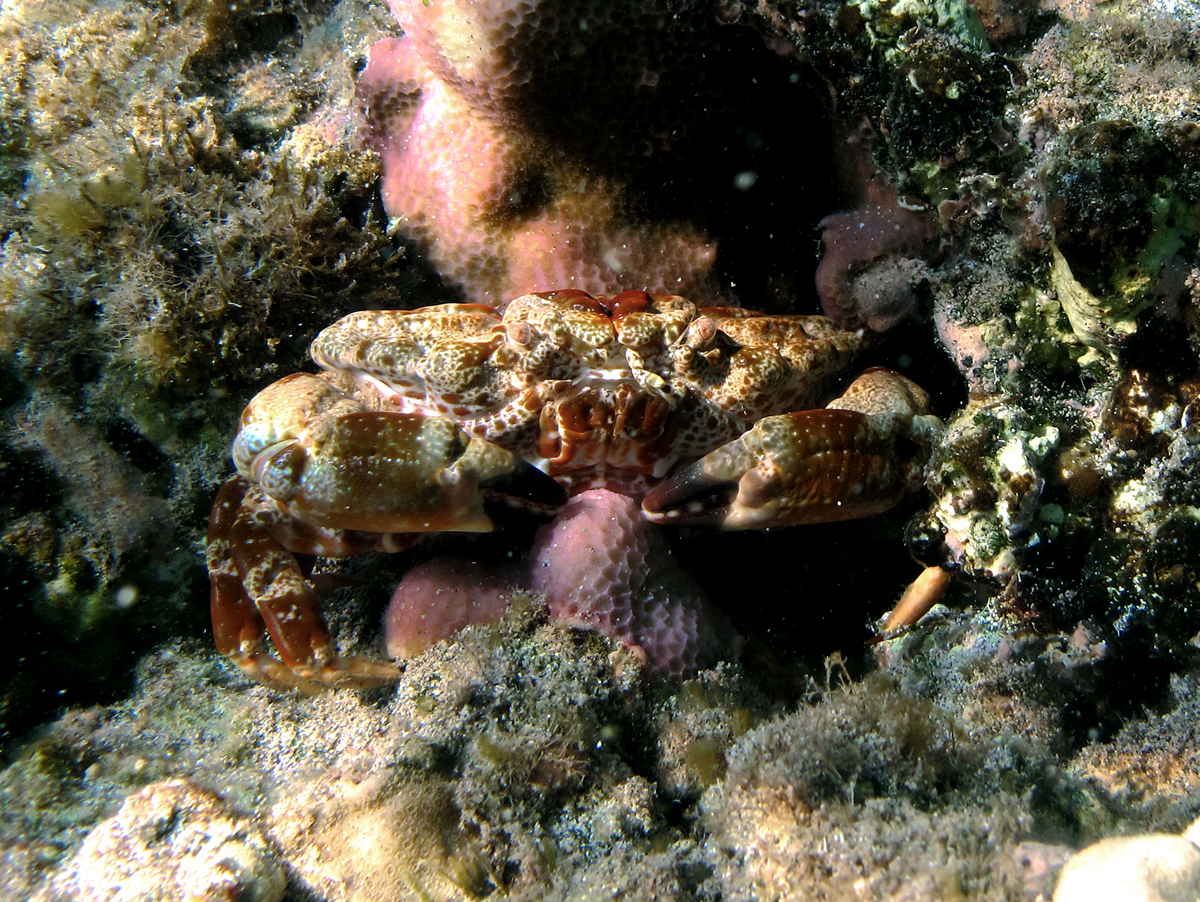
- Neoxanthias impressus

Scientific classification
- Kingdom: Animalia
- Phylum: Arthropoda
- Class: Malacostraca
- Order: Decapoda
- Suborder: Pleocyemata
- Infraorder: Brachyura
- Family: Xanthidae
- Genus: Neoxanthias; Ward, 1933

= Neoxanthias =

Genus of crabs

Neoxanthias is a genus of crabs in the family Xanthidae, containing the following species:

- Neoxanthias impressus (Latreille, 1812)
- Neoxanthias lacunosus (Rathbun, 1906)
- Neoxanthias michelae Serene & Vadon, 1981
