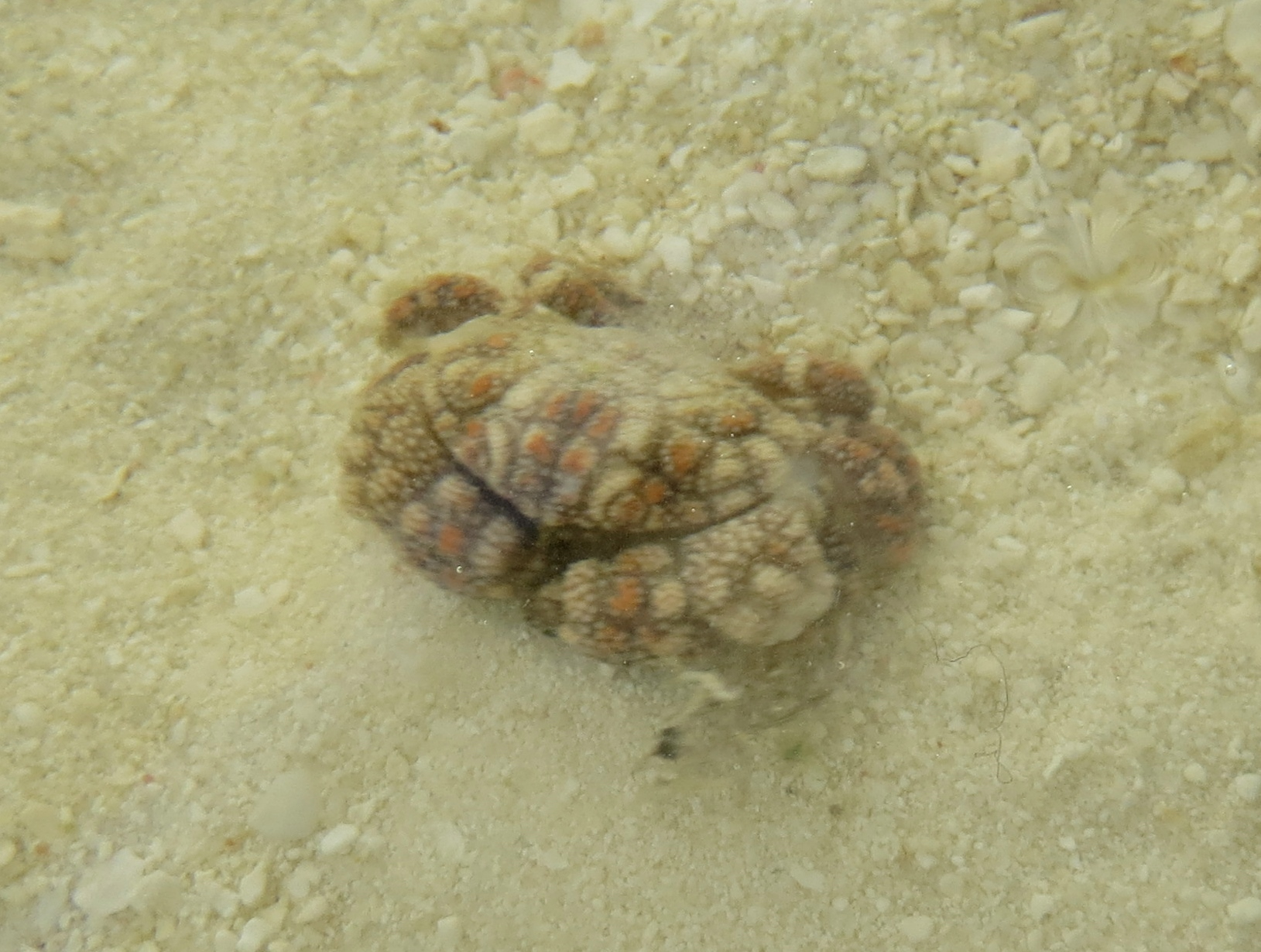

Scientific classification
- Domain: Eukaryota
- Kingdom: Animalia
- Phylum: Arthropoda
- Class: Malacostraca
- Order: Decapoda
- Suborder: Pleocyemata
- Infraorder: Brachyura
- Family: Xanthidae
- Subfamily: Actaeinae
- Genus: Pseudoliomera; Odhner, 1925

= Pseudoliomera =

Genus of crabs

Pseudoliomera is a genus of crabs in the family Xanthidae, containing the following species:

- Pseudoliomera granosimana (A. Milne-Edwards, 1865)
- Pseudoliomera helleri (A. Milne-Edwards, 1865)
- Pseudoliomera lata (Borradaile, 1902)
- Pseudoliomera neospeciosa (Deb, 1989)
- Pseudoliomera paraspeciosa (Ward, 1941)
- Pseudoliomera remota (Rathbun, 1907)
- Pseudoliomera ruppellioides (Odhner, 1925)
- Pseudoliomera speciosa (Dana, 1852)
- Pseudoliomera variolosa (Borradaile, 1902)
- Pseudoliomera violacea (A. Milne-Edwards, 1873)
