= Ladomedaeus =

Scientific classification
- Domain: Eukaryota
- Kingdom: Animalia
- Phylum: Arthropoda
- Class: Malacostraca
- Order: Decapoda
- Suborder: Pleocyemata
- Infraorder: Brachyura
- Family: Xanthidae
- Genus: Ladomedaeus; Števčić, 2005

Genus of crabs

Ladomedaeus is a genus of crabs in the family Xanthidae, containing the following species:

- Ladomedaeus fungillus Manuel-Santos & Ng, 2007
- Ladomedaeus serratus (Sakai, 1965)
