= Tweedieia =

Scientific classification
- Kingdom: Animalia
- Phylum: Arthropoda
- Class: Malacostraca
- Order: Decapoda
- Suborder: Pleocyemata
- Infraorder: Brachyura
- Family: Xanthidae
- Subfamily: Chlorodiellinae
- Genus: Tweedieia; Ward, 1935

Genus of crabs

Tweedieia is a genus of crabs in the family Xanthidae, containing the following species:

- Tweedieia laysani (Rathbun, 1906)
- Tweedieia odhneri (Gordon, 1934)
