= Kraussia rugulosa =

Scientific classification
- Kingdom: Animalia
- Phylum: Arthropoda
- Class: Malacostraca
- Order: Decapoda
- Suborder: Pleocyemata
- Infraorder: Brachyura
- Family: Xanthidae
- Genus: Kraussia; Dana, 1852
- Species: K. rugulosa

Binomial name
- Kraussia rugulosa (Krauss, 1843)

Synonyms
- Platyonychus rugulosus Krauss, 1843; Trichocera porcellana White, 1848; Kraussia proporcellana Ward, 1934

Species of crab

Kraussia rugulosa is a species of crab in the family Xanthidae, the only species in the genus Kraussia.
