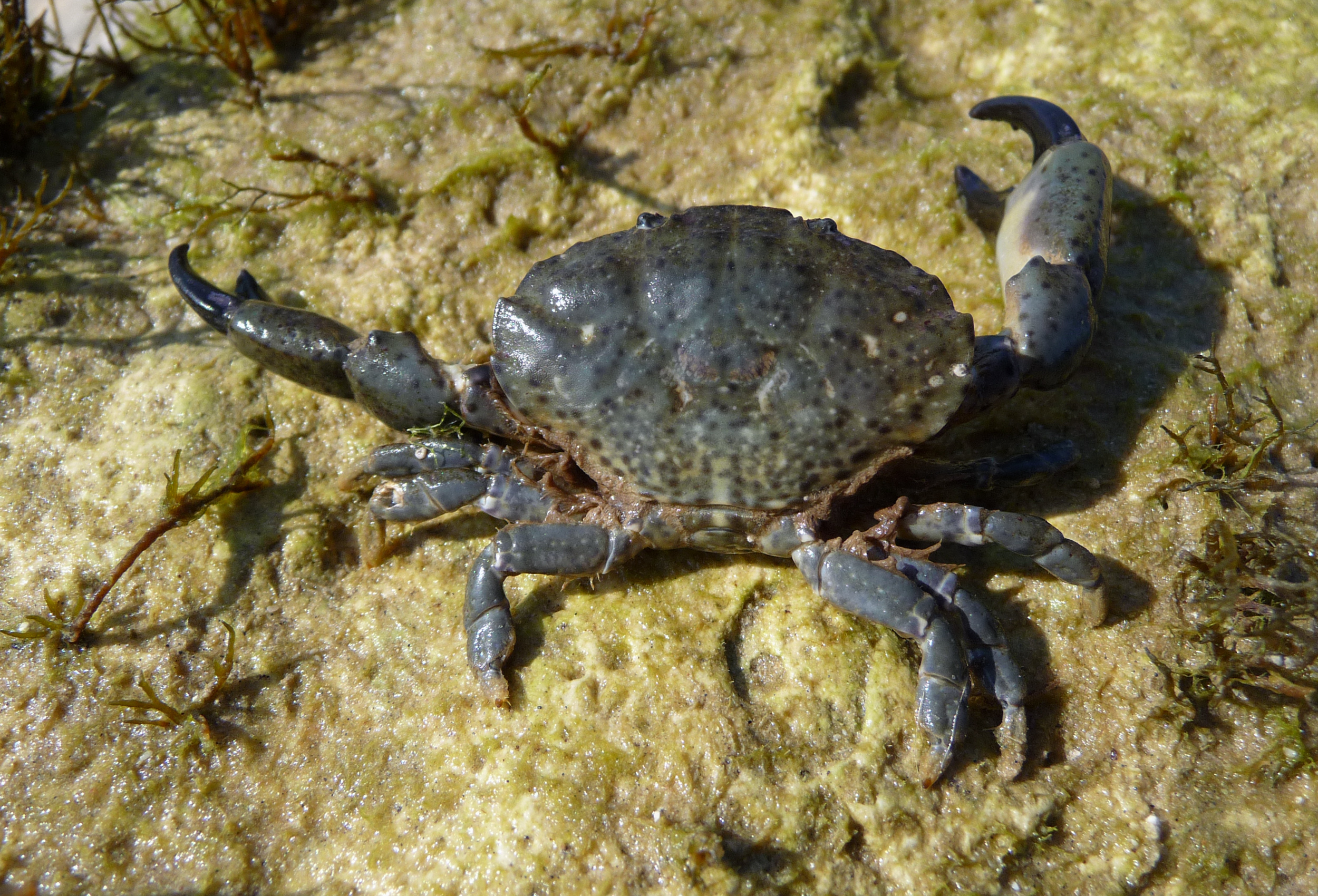
- Xantho poressa

Scientific classification
- Kingdom: Animalia
- Phylum: Arthropoda
- Clade: Pancrustacea
- Class: Malacostraca
- Order: Decapoda
- Suborder: Pleocyemata
- Infraorder: Brachyura
- Superfamily: Xanthoidea
- Family: Xanthidae; Macleay, 1838

Subfamilies
- Actaeinae Alcock, 1898; Banareiinae Števčić, 2005; Chlorodiellinae Ng & Holthuis, 2007; Cymoinae Alcock, 1898; Etisinae Ortmann, 1893; Euxanthinae Alcock, 1898; Glyptoxanthinae Mendoza & Guinot, 2011; Kraussiinae Ng, 1993; Liomerinae T. Sakai, 1976; Polydectinae Dana, 1851; Xanthinae MacLeay, 1838; Zosiminae Alcock, 1898

= Xanthidae =

Family of crabs

Xanthidae is a family of crabs known as gorilla crabs, mud crabs, pebble crabs or rubble crabs. Xanthid crabs are often brightly coloured and are highly poisonous, containing toxins which are not destroyed by cooking and for which no antidote is known. The toxins are similar to the tetrodotoxin and saxitoxin produced by puffer fish, and may be produced by bacteria in the genus Vibrio living in symbiosis with the crabs, mostly V. alginolyticus and V. parahaemolyticus.

== Classification ==
Many species formerly included in the family Xanthidae have since been moved to new families. Despite this, Xanthidae is still the largest crab family in terms of species richness, contanining the following subfamilies and genera:

- Actaeinae Alcock, 1898
  - Actaea De Haan, 1833
  - Actaeodes Dana, 1851
  - Actaeops † Portell & Collins, 2004
  - Allactaea Williams, 1974
  - Eoxanthops † Beschin, Busulini, Tessier & Zorzin, 2016
  - Epiactaea Serène, 1984
  - Epiactaeodes Serène, 1984
  - Forestiana Guinot & Low, 2010
  - Gaillardiellus Guinot, 1976
  - Heteractaea Lockington, 1877
  - Lambropsis † Lőrenthey, 1907
  - Lobiactaea T. Sakai, 1983
  - Meractaea Serène, 1984
  - Novactaea Guinot, 1976
  - Odhnea Ng & Low, 2010
  - Paractaea Guinot, 1969
  - Paractaeopsis Serène, 1984
  - Phlyctenodes † A. Milne-Edwards, 1862
  - Platyactaea Guinot, 1967
  - Pseudoliomera Odhner, 1925
  - Pseudophlyctenodes † Busulini, Tessier & Beschin, 2006
  - Rata Davie, 1993
  - Serenius Guinot, 1976
- Banareiinae Števčić, 2005
  - Banareia A. Milne-Edwards, 1869
  - Calvactaea Ward, 1933
  - Pseudactaea Guinot, 1971
  - Trichia Rathbun, 1897
- Chlorodiellinae Ng & Holthuis, 2007
  - Chlorodiella Rathbun, 1897
  - Cyclodius Dana, 1851
  - Liocarpilodes Klunzinger, 1913
  - Luniella Lasley, Klaus & Ng, 2015
  - Pilodius Dana, 1851
  - Ratha Lasley, Lai & Thoma, 2013
  - Soliella Lasley, Klaus & Ng, 2015
  - Sulcodius P. F. Clark & Ng, 1999
  - Tweedieia Ward, 1935
  - Vellodius Ng & Yang, 1998
- Cymoinae Alcock, 1898
  - Cymo De Haan, 1833
- Etisinae Ortmann, 1893
  - Etisus H. Milne-Edwards, 1834
  - Paraetisus Ward, 1933
- Euxanthinae Alcock, 1898
  - Alainodaeus Davie, 1993
  - Batodaeus Vázquez-Bader & Gracia, 2004
  - Carpoporus Stimpson, 1871
  - Cranaothus Ng, 1993
  - Crosnierius Serène & Vadon, 1981
  - Danielea Ng & P. F. Clark, 2003
  - Edwardsium Guinot, 1967
  - Epistocavea Davie, 1993
  - Euxanthus Dana, 1851
  - Gothus Yuan, Jiang, and Sha, 2024 (Note: Provisionally placed in Euxanthinae, although its phylogenetic position is unstable.)
  - Guinotellus Serène, 1971
  - Hepatoporus Serène, 1984
  - Hypocolpus Rathbun, 1897
  - Jacforus Ng & P. F. Clark, 2003
  - Ladomedaeus Števčić, 2005
  - Lipaesthesius Rathbun, 1898
  - Lipkemedaeus Števčić, 2011
  - Medaeops Guinot, 1967
  - Medaeus Dana, 1851
  - Miersiella Guinot, 1967
  - Monodaeus Guinot, 1967
  - Olenothus Ng, 2002
  - Palatigum Davie, 1997
  - Paramedaeus Guinot, 1967
  - Paraxanthodes Guinot, 1968
  - Pilomedaeus Takeda & Komatsu, 2011
  - Pleurocolpus Crosnier, 1995
  - Psaumis Kossmann, 1877
  - Rizalthus Mendoza & Ng, 2008
  - Takedax Mendoza & Ng, 2012
  - Visayax Mendoza & Ng, 2008
- Glyptoxanthinae Mendoza & Guinot, 2011
  - Glyptoxanthus A. Milne-Edwards, 1879
- Kraussiinae Ng, 1993
  - Garthasia Ng, 1993
  - Kraussia Dana, 1852
  - Palapedia Ng, 1993
- Liomerinae T. Sakai, 1976
  - Actiomera Ng, Guinot & Davie, 2008
  - Bruciana Serène, 1977
  - Liomera Dana, 1851
  - Lipkemera Davie, 2010
  - Neoliomera Odhner, 1925
  - Neomeria † C.-H. Hu & Tao, 1996
  - Paraliomera Rathbun, 1930
- Polydectinae Dana, 1851
  - Lybia H. Milne-Edwards, 1834
  - Polydectus H. Milne-Edwards, 1837
  - Tunebia Mendoza & Ng, 2011
- Xanthinae MacLeay, 1838
  - Aldrovandiopanope Števčić, 2011
  - Aristotelopanope Števčić, 2011
  - Bottoxanthodes Števčić, 2011
  - Camilohelleria Števčić, 2011
  - Cataleptodius Guinot, 1968
  - Coralliope Guinot, 1967
  - Cycloxanthops Rathbun, 1897
  - Demania Laurie, 1906
  - Epixanthops Serène, 1984
  - Eurycassiope Mendoza, 2023
  - Euryxanthops Garth & Kim, 1983
  - Gaudichaudia Rathbun, 1930
  - Guitonia Garth & Iliffe, 1992
  - Juxtaxanthias Ward, 1942
  - Lachnopodus Stimpson, 1858
  - Leptodius A. Milne-Edwards, 1863
  - Liagore De Haan, 1833
  - Lioxanthodes Calman, 1909
  - Macromedaeus Ward, 1942
  - Marratha Ng & P. F. Clark, 2003
  - Megametope Filhol, 1886
  - Megamia † Karasawa, 1993
  - Metaxanthops Serène, 1984
  - Metopoxantho † De Man, 1904
  - Neolioxantho Garth & Kim, 1983
  - Neoxanthias Ward, 1932
  - Neoxanthops Guinot, 1968
  - Orphnoxanthus Alcock, 1896
  - Ovatis Ng & H.-I. Chen, 2004
  - Palaeoxanthops † Karasawa, 1993
  - Paraxanthias Odhner, 1925
  - Paraxanthus Lucas, 1844
  - Pestoxanthodes Števčić, 2011
  - Pseudomedaeus Guinot, 1968
  - Wardoxanthops Števčić, 2011
  - Williamstimpsonia Števčić, 2011
  - Xanthias Rathbun, 1897
  - Xantho Leach, 1814
  - Xanthodius Stimpson, 1859
- Zosiminae Alcock, 1898
  - Atergatis De Haan, 1833
  - Atergatopsis A. Milne-Edwards, 1862
  - Lophozozymus A. Milne-Edwards, 1863
  - Paratergatis T. Sakai, 1965
  - Platypodia Bell, 1835
  - Platypodiella Guinot, 1967
  - Pulcratis Ng & Huang, 1977
  - Zosimus Leach, 1818
  - Zozymodes Heller, 1861
- Incertae sedis
  - Haydnella † Müller, 1984
  - Nogarolia † Beschin, Busulini, De Angeli & Tessier, 1994
  - Sculptoplax † Müller & Collins, 1991
