= List of prehistoric malacostracans =

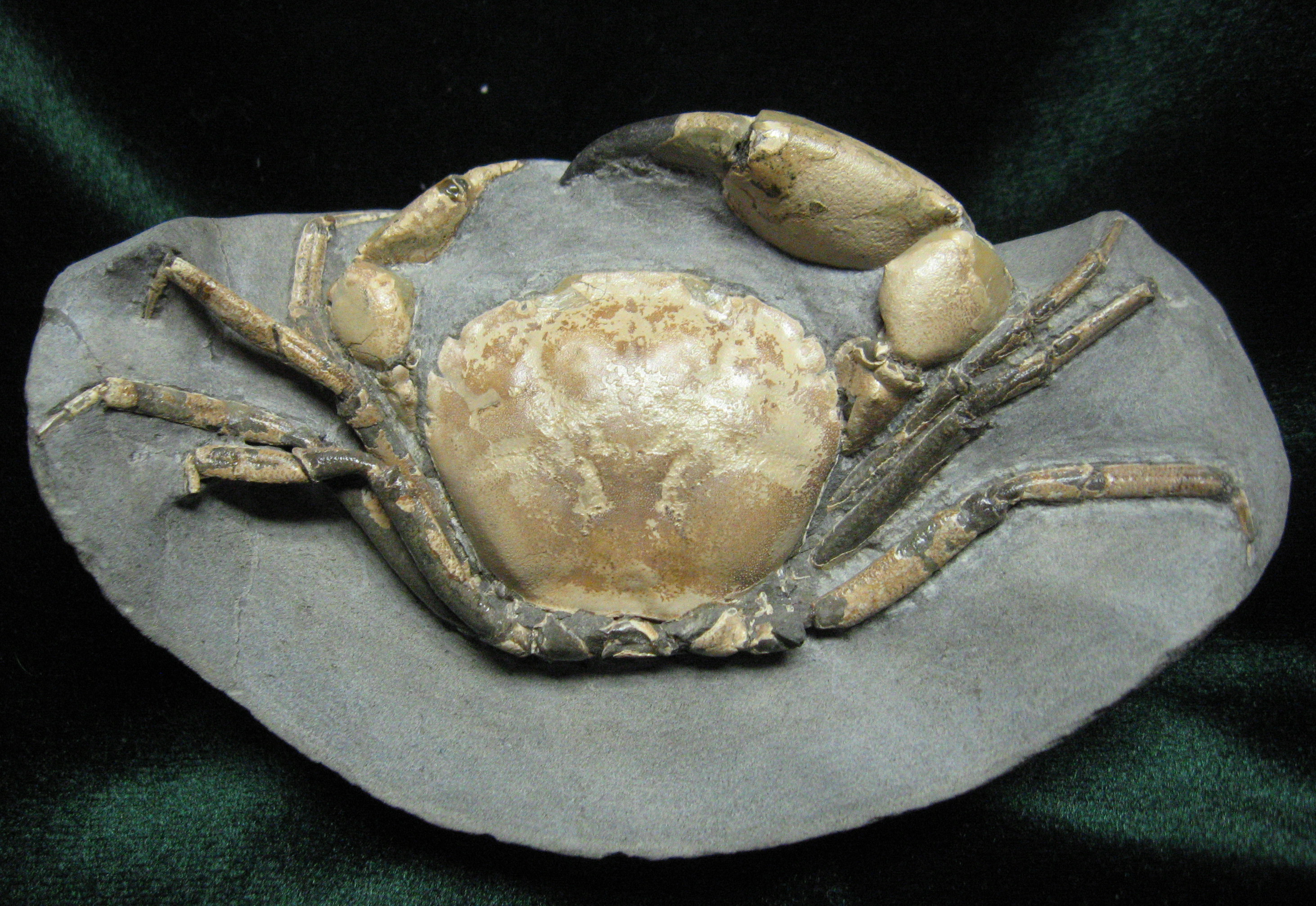
Branchioplax (Decapoda: Brachyura)

This list of prehistoric malacostracans illustrates the genera from the fossil record that have ever been considered to be malacostracans, a class of crustacean arthropod, excluding purely vernacular terms. The list includes all commonly accepted genera, but also genera that are now considered invalid, doubtful (nomina dubia), or were not formally published (nomina nuda), as well as junior synonyms of more established names, and genera that are no longer considered malacostracans. The majority of the genera are from the order Decapoda, for which a recent synopsis allows invalid names to be excluded.

== Order Decapoda ==
=== Suborder Dendrobranchiata ===
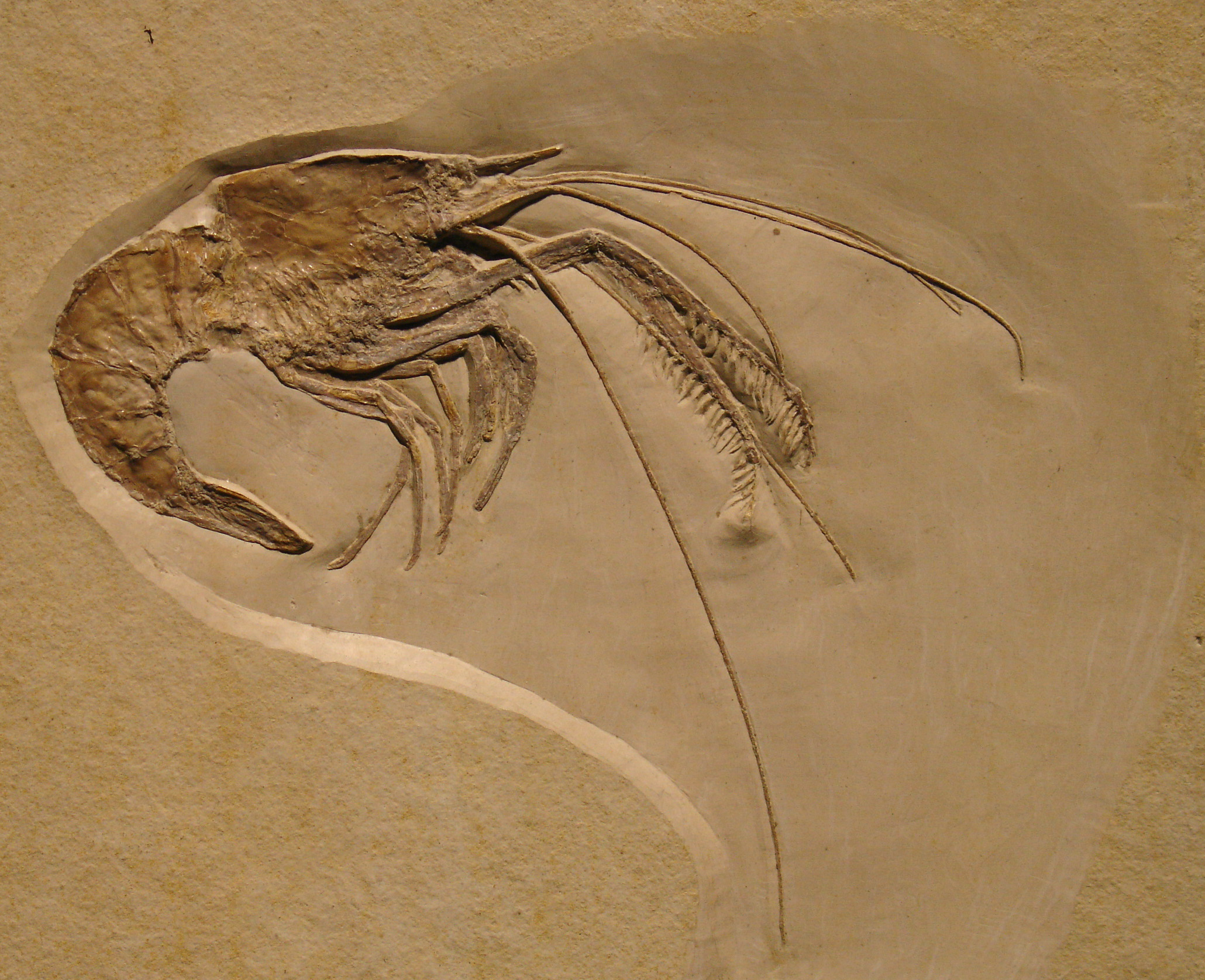
Aeger elegans (Aegeridae)

- Acanthochirana
- Aeger
- Albertoppelia
- Ambilobeia
- Antrimpos
- Archeosolenocera
- Benthesicymus
- Bombur
- Bylgia
- Carinacaris
- Carpopenaeus
- Cretapenaeus
- Cretasergestes
- Drobna
- Dusa
- Hakelocaris
- Ifasya
- Koelga
- Libanocaris
- Longichela
- Longitergite
- Macropenaeus
- Microchela
- Micropenaeus
- Paleomattea
- Penaeus
- Pseudobombur
- Pseudodusa
- Rauna
- Rhodanicaris
- Satyrocaris
- Sicyonia

=== Infraorder Stenopodidea ===
- Jilinicaris
- Phoenice

=== Infraorder Caridea ===
- Acanthinopus
- Alburnia
- Alcmonacaris
- Bannikovia
- Bechleja
- Beurlenia
- Blaculla
- Buergerocaris
- Caridina
- Crangon
- Delclosia
- Gampsurus
- Harthofia
- Hefriga
- Leiothorax
- Micropsalis
- Morscrangon
- Notostomus
- Odontochelion
- Oplophorus
- Palaemon
- Pandalus
- Parvocaris
- Pasiphaea
- Pinnacaris
- Pleopteryx
- Propalaemon
- Pseudocaridinella
- Schmelingia
- Tonellocaris
- Udora
- Udorella
- Yongjiacaris

=== Infraorder Astacidea ===
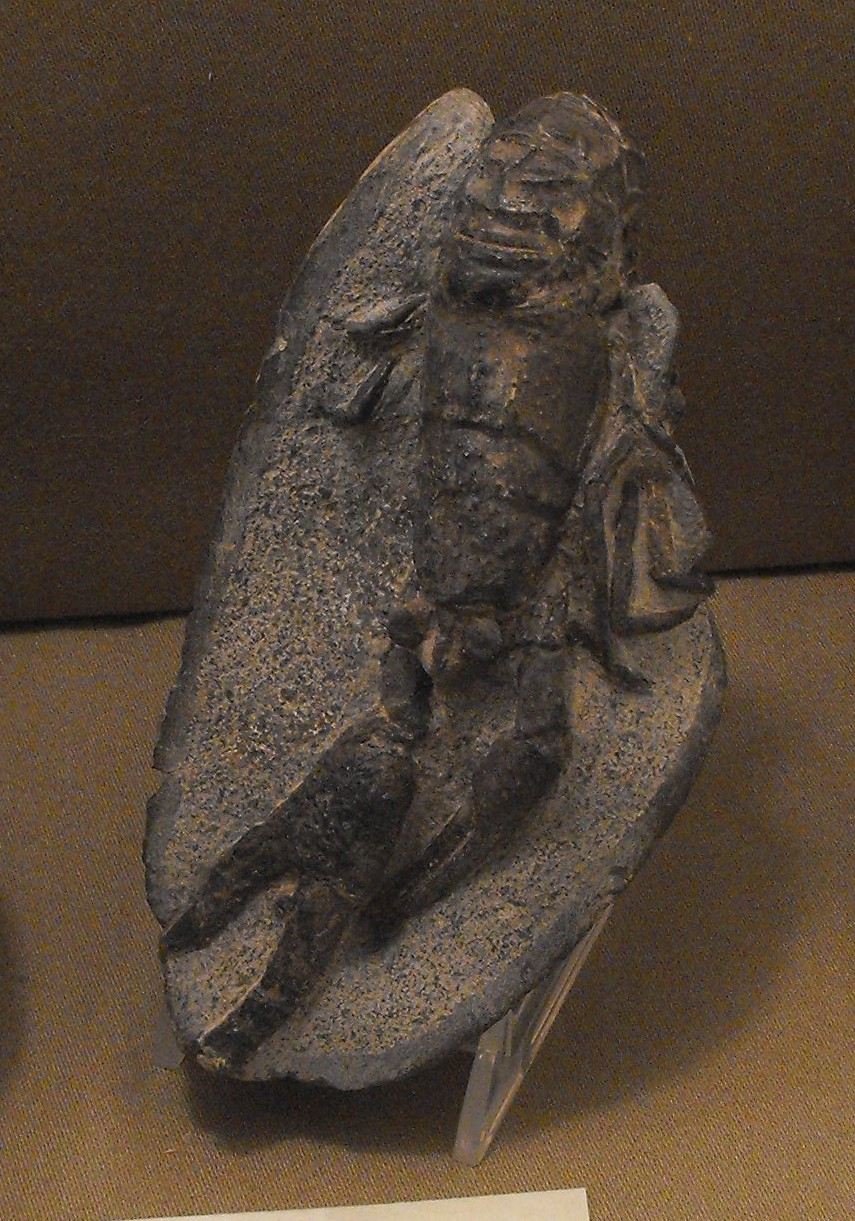
Palaeonephrops browni (Bearpaw Shale, Cretaceous)

- Astacopsis
- Astacus
- Austropotamobius
- Chilenophoberus
- Cricoidoscelosus
- Homarus
- Hoploparia
- Jagtia
- Lammuastacus
- Malmuncina
- Metanephrops
- Nephrops
- Nephropsis
- Oncopareia
- Pacifastacus
- Palaeocambarus
- Palaeoechinastacus
- Palaeonephrops
- Palaeopalaemon
- Palaeophoberus
- Paraclythia
- Paranephrops
- Procambarus
- Protastacus
- Pseudastacus
- Pseudohomarus
- Stenochirus
- Tillocheles
- Uncina

=== Infraorder Glypheidea ===
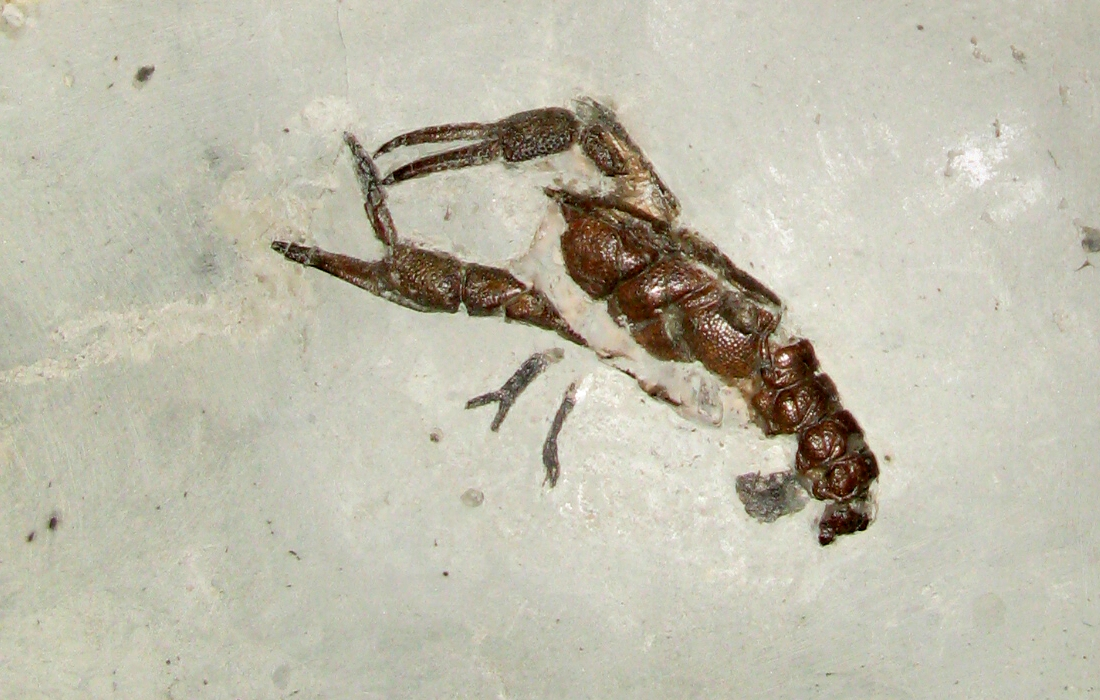
Eryma mandelslohi (Jurassic)

- Cedrillosia
- Chimaerastacus
- Clytiella
- Clytiopsis
- Enoploclytia
- Eryma
- Galicia
- Glaessnericaris
- Glyphea
- Huhatanka
- Jabaloya
- Lissocardia
- Litogaster
- Mecochirus
- Meyeria
- Palaeastacus
- Paraclytiopsis
- Paralitogaster
- Pemphix
- Platychela
- Platypleon
- Praeatya
- Protoclytiopsis
- Pseudoglyphea
- Pseudopemphix
- Pustulina
- Selenisca
- Sinopemphix
- Squamosoglyphea
- Stenodactylina
- Trachysoma

=== Infraorder Thalassinidea ===
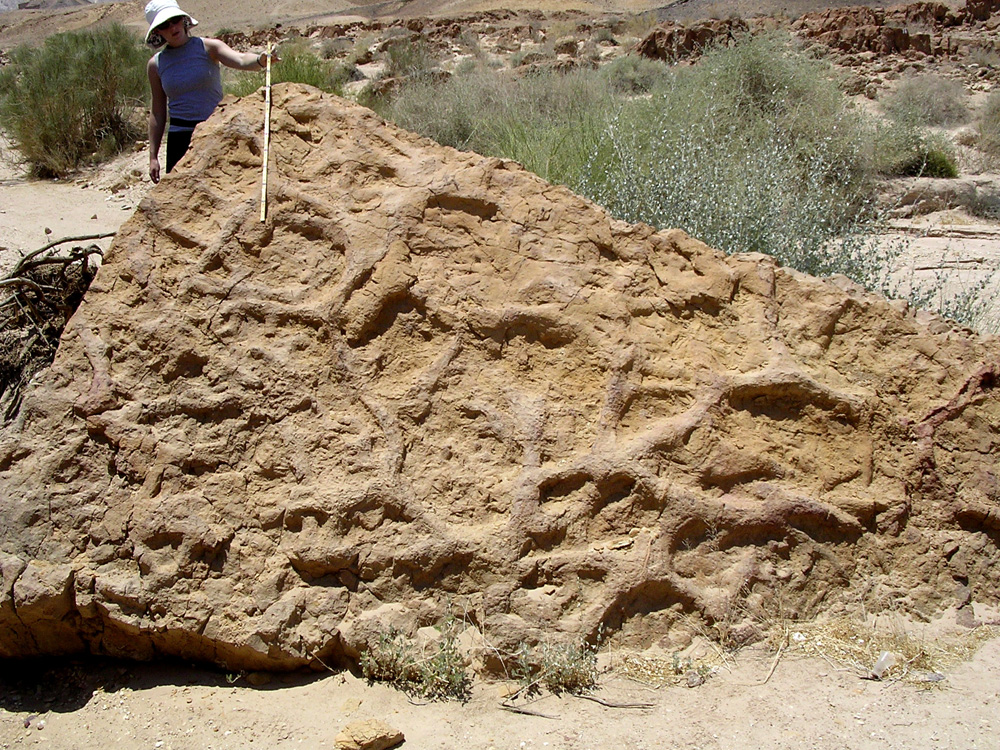
Thalassinoides, an ichnofossil produced by a thalassinidean (Israel, Middle Jurassic)

- Axiopsis
- Axius
- Brecanclawu
- Callianassa
- Callianopsis
- Calliax
- Callichirus
- Comoxianassa
- Corallianassa
- Cowichianassa
- Ctenocheles
- Eoglypturus
- Etallonia
- Eucalliax
- Glypturus
- Gourretia
- Huxleycaris
- Jaxea
- Laomedia
- Laurentiella
- Lepidophthalmus
- Magila
- Megachela
- Melipal
- Neocallichirus
- Neotrypaea
- Nihonotrypaea
- Paki
- Podocallichirus
- Protaxius
- Protocallianassa
- Schlueteria
- Sergio
- Thalassina
- Trypaea
- Upogebia
- Vegarthron

=== Infraorder Achelata ===
- Archaeocarabus
- Archaeopalinurus
- Astacodes
- Biarctus
- Cancrinos
- Jasus
- Justitia
- Linuparus
- Palaeopalinurus
- Palibacus
- Palinurina
- Palinurus
- Panulirus
- Parribacus
- Pehuenchia
- Scyllarella
- Scyllarides
- Scyllarus
- Tricarina

=== Infraorder Polychelida ===
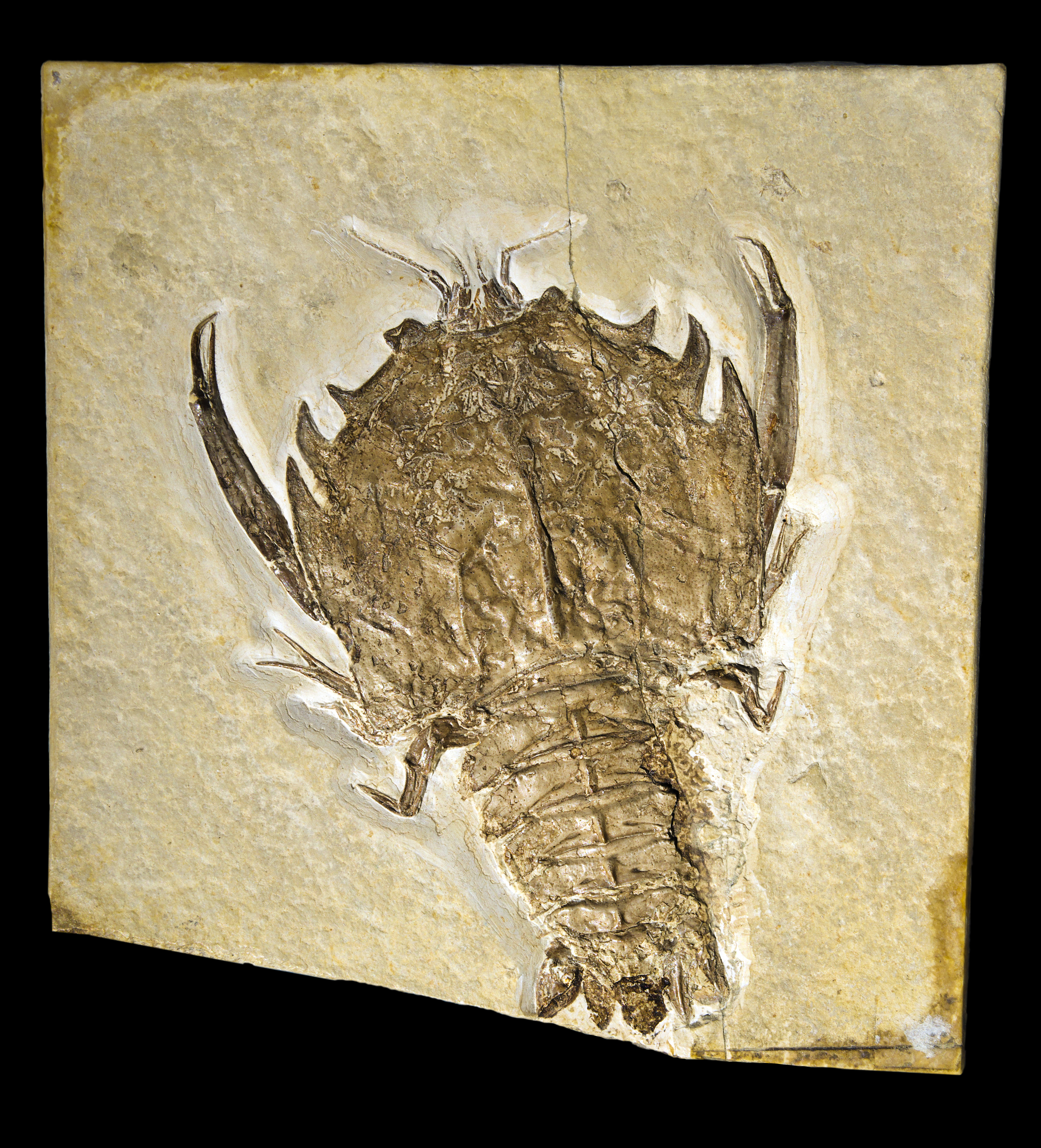
Eryon arctiformis (Solnhofen Limestone, Tithonian)

- Antarcticheles
- Coleia
- Cycleryon
- Eryon
- Hasaracancer
- Hellerocaris
- Knebelia
- Palaeopentacheles
- Proeryon
- Pseudocoleia
- Rosenfeldia
- Tetrachela
- Tropifer
- Willemoesiocaris

=== Infraorder Anomura ===
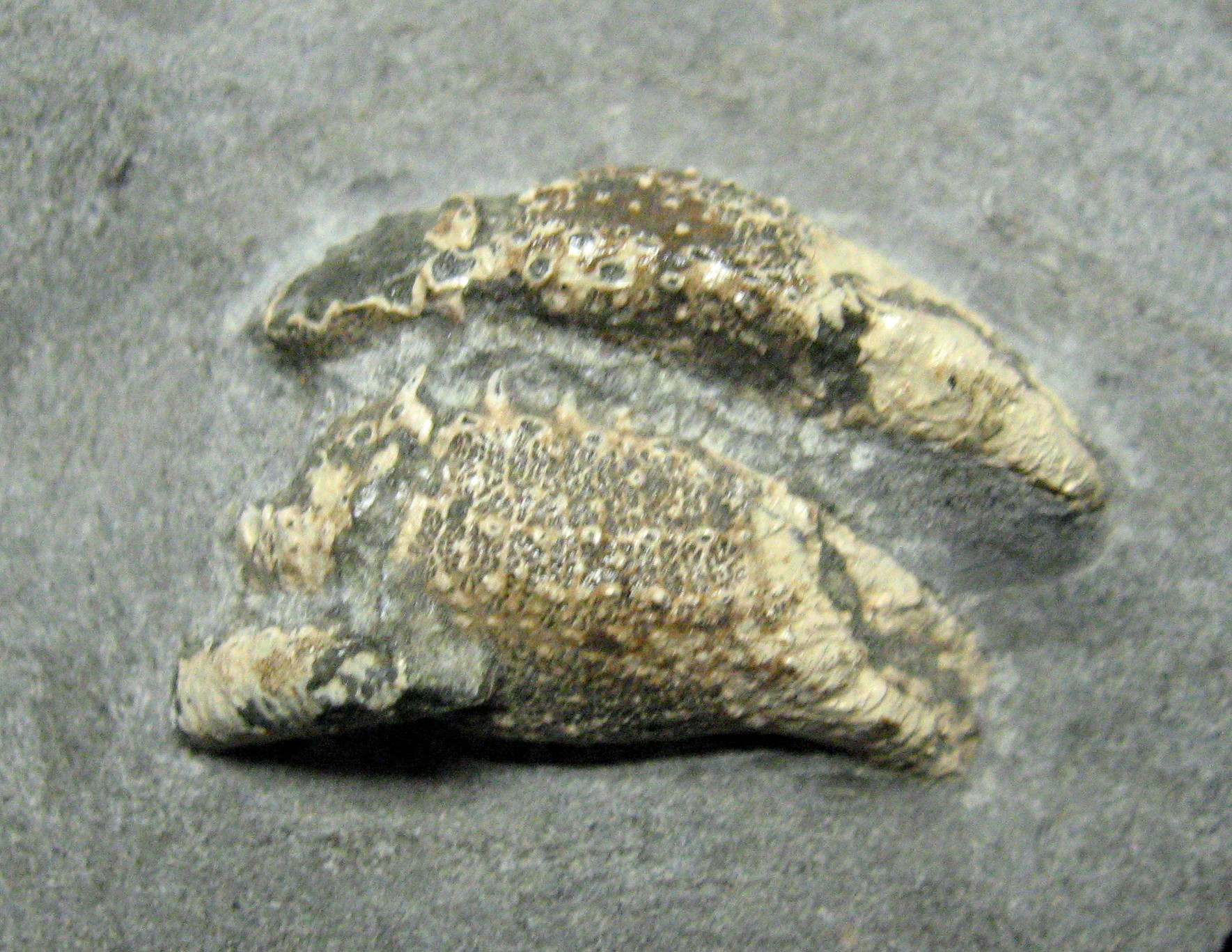
Claws of an Eocene hermit crab of the genus Dardanus

- Acanthogalathea
- Albunea
- Ammopylocheles
- Anapagurus
- Annieporcellana
- Annuntidiogenes
- Austromunida
- Beripetrolisthes
- Birgus
- Brazilomunida
- Calcinus
- Calteagalathea
- Ciliopagurus
- Clibanarius
- Coenobita
- Cretagalathea
- Dardanus
- Diacanthurus
- Diogenes
- Eocalcinus
- Eocarcinus
- Eomunidopsis
- Eopaguropsis
- Eopetrolisthes
- Eotylaspis
- Eumunida
- Faxegalathea
- Galathea
- Gastrosacus
- Goniochirus
- Harryhausenia
- Haumuriaegla
- Italialbunea
- Jurapylocheles
- Lessinigalathea
- Lobipetrolisthes
- Longoporcellana
- Lophomastix
- Lophoraninella
- Luisogalathea
- Mesogalathea
- Mesoparapylocheles
- Munida
- Munidopsis
- Munitheites
- Orhomalus
- Ovocarcinus
- Pachycheles
- Paguristes
- Pagurus
- Palaeomunida
- Palaeomunidopsis
- Palaeopagurus
- Paragalathea
- Paralomis
- Parapaguristes
- Petrochirus
- Petrolisthes
- Pisidia
- Platykotta
- Polyonyx
- Porcellana
- Porcellanoidea
- Praealbunea
- Pristinaspina
- Protaegla
- Protomunida
- Pylopagurus
- Retrorsichela
- Shinkaia
- Spathagalathea
- Stemonopa
- Striadiogenes
- Zygopa

=== Infraorder Brachyura ===
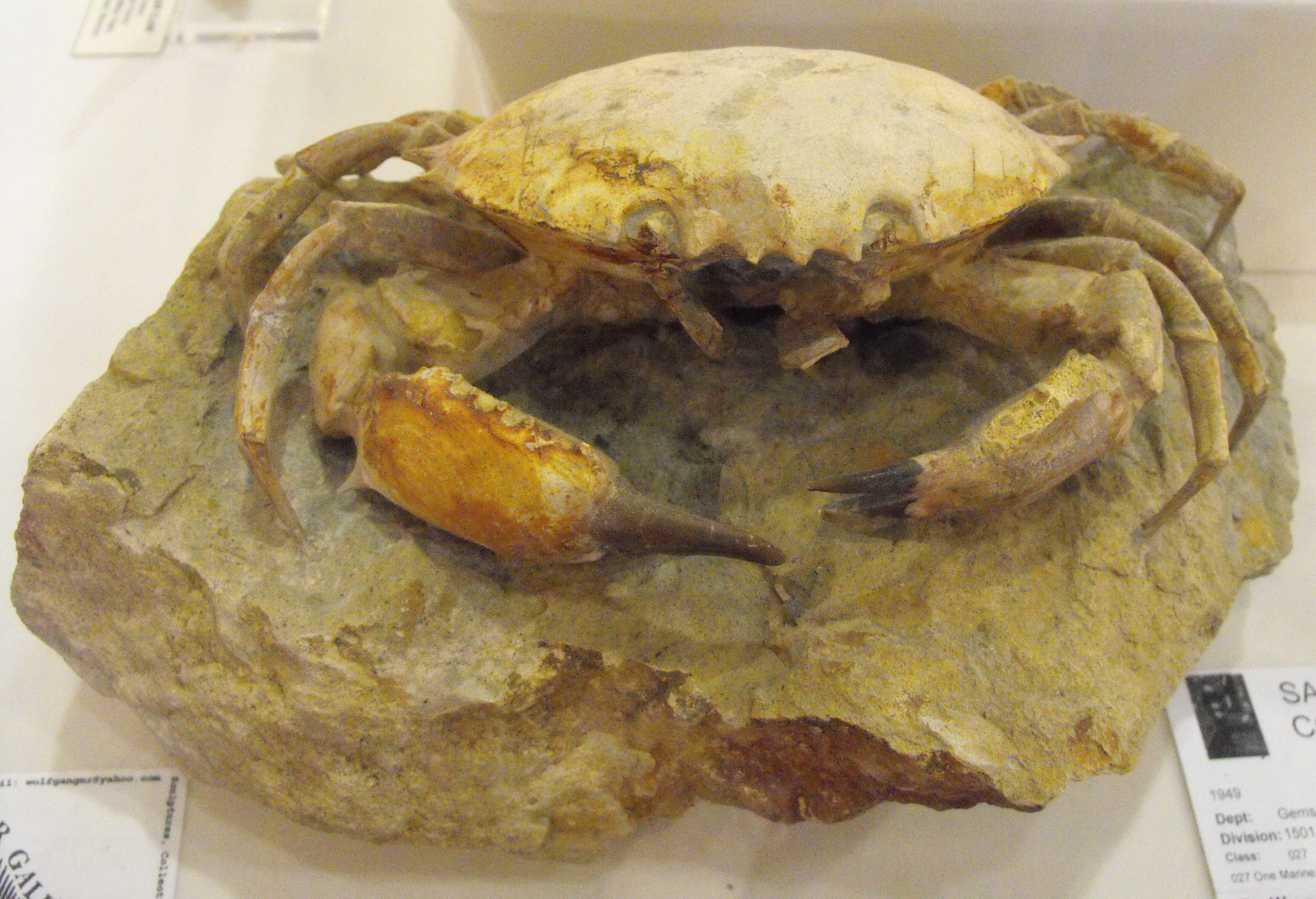
Harpactocarcinus (Eocene)

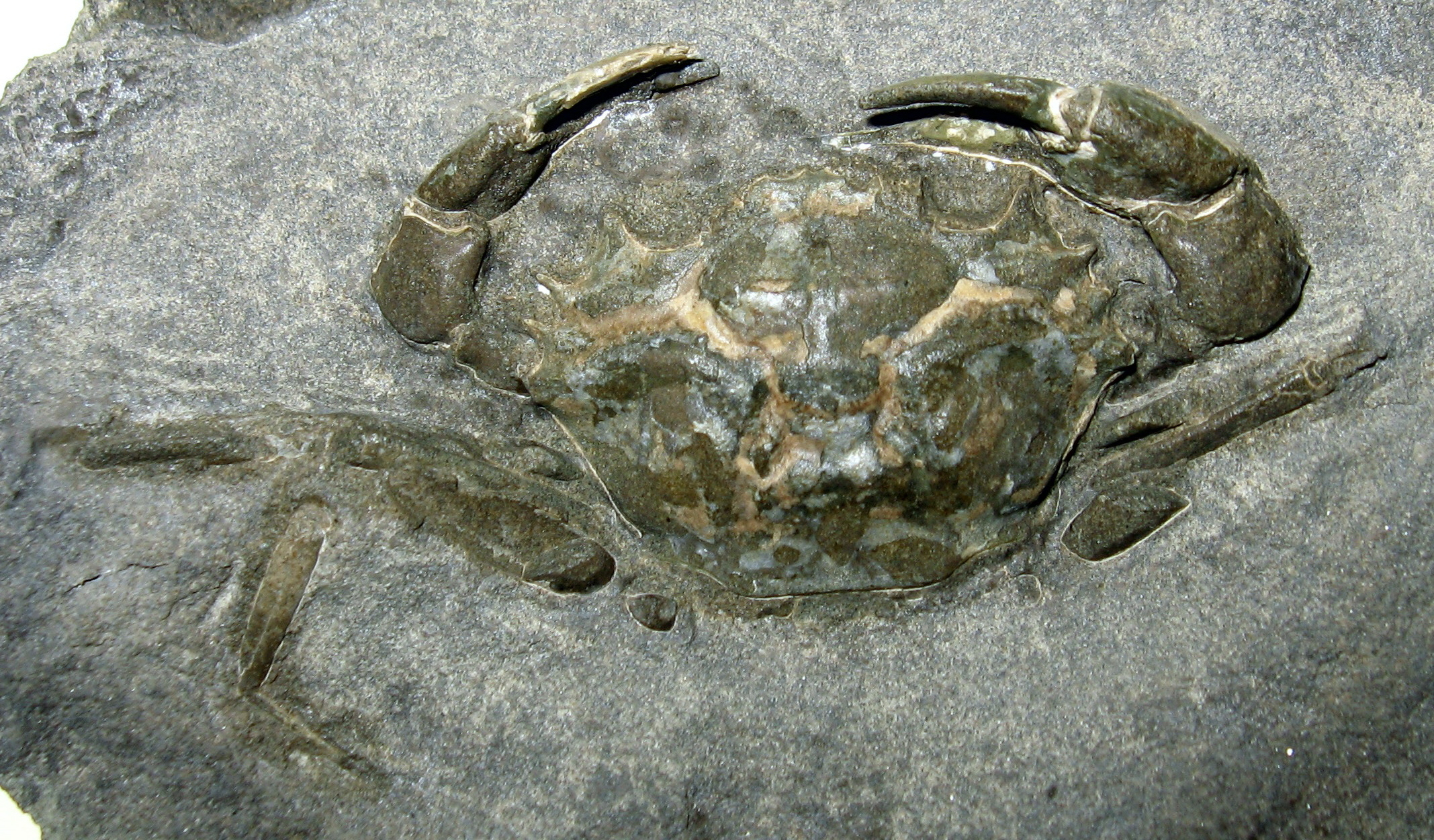
Megokkos alaskensis (Late Eocene)

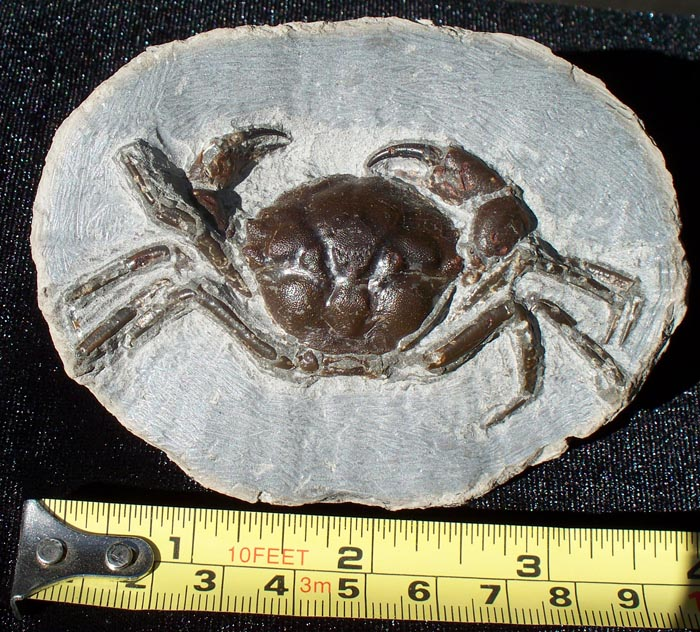
Pulalius (Oligocene)

- Abyssophthalmus
- Acanthocarpus
- Acanthodiaulax
- Acantholambrus
- Acanthoportunus
- Achaeus
- Actaea
- Actaeites
- Actaeodes
- Actaeops
- Actaeopsis
- Actinotocarcinus
- Actumnus
- Ameridromia
- Ampliura
- Amydrocarcinus
- Anaglyptus
- Anatolikos
- Andorina
- Anisospinos
- Antarctidromia
- Antarctomithrax
- Araripecarcinus
- Arcania
- Archaeocypoda
- Archaeogeryon
- Archaeoplax
- Archaeopus
- Archaeotetra
- Archaeozius
- Arenaeus
- Arges
- Ashtoret
- Asthenognathus
- Atelecyclus
- Atergatis
- Aulacopodia
- Austrohelice
- Avitelmessus
- Balcacarcinus
- Banareia
- Baricarcinus
- Bartethusa
- Basinotopus
- Bicarinocarcinus
- Bicornisranina
- Binkhorstia
- Bittnereus
- Bittnerilia
- Boschettia
- Brachynotus
- Branchiocarcinus
- Branchiolambrus
- Branchioplax
- Brome
- Bucculentum
- Budapanopeus
- Calappa
- Calappella
- Calappilia
- Callinectes
- Caloxanthus
- Camarocarcinus
- Campylostoma
- Cancer
- Cancrixantho
- Caprocancer
- Carcineretes
- Carcinoplax
- Carcinus
- Cardirhynchus
- Cardisoma
- Carinocarcinoides
- Carinocarcinus
- Carpilius
- Carupa
- Cenocorystes
- Cenomanocarcinus
- Ceronnectes
- Chaceon
- Charybdis
- Chasmocarcinus
- Cherpiocarcinus
- Chirinocarcinus
- Chlinocephalus
- Chlorodiella
- Chorilia
- Cicarnus
- Coeloma
- Coelopus
- Collinsius
- Colneptunus
- Colpocaris
- Componocancer
- Corallicarcinus
- Corazzatocarcinus
- Corystes
- Costacopluma
- Cretachlorodius
- Cretacocarcinus
- Cretacoranina
- Cristafrons
- Cristella
- Cristipluma
- Cronius
- Crossotonotus
- Cryptodromia
- Cryptolutea
- Cryptosoma
- Cyamocarcinus
- Cyclocancer
- Cyclocorystes
- Cyclodius
- Cycloes
- Cyclograpsus
- Cycloprosopon
- Cyclothyreus
- Cycloxanthops
- Cymonomus
- Cyrtorhina
- Dagnaudus
- Daira
- Dakoticancer
- Daldorfia
- Daragrapsus
- Daranyia
- Demania
- Derilambrus
- Diaulax
- Dioratiopus
- Distefania
- Doerflesia
- Dorippe
- Drachiella
- Dromia
- Dromidia
- Dromilites
- Dromiopsis
- Duncania
- Dynomene
- Dynomenopsis
- Ebalia
- Ekalakia
- Enoplolambrus
- Enoplonotus
- Eocarpilius
- Eocharybdis
- Eodorippe
- Eodromites
- Eohalimede
- Eoinachoides
- Eomaldivia
- Eomatuta
- Eopalicus
- Eopilumnus
- Eoplax
- Eoprosopon
- Eotrachynotocarcinus
- Eoxanthias
- Epialtus
- Epigodromia
- Epixanthus
- Eriocheir
- Eriosachila
- Eriphia
- Ethusa
- Etisus
- Etyus
- Etyxanthosia
- Euclosia
- Eucorystes
- Eucrate
- Eumorphactaea
- Eumorphocorystes
- Euphylax
- Euprognatha
- Euronectes
- Eurycarpus
- Euryozius
- Eurypanopeus
- Euryplax
- Eurytium
- Euxanthus
- Falconoplax
- Falsiportunites
- Feldmannia
- Forestia
- Fredericia
- Gabriella
- Gaillardiellus
- Galene
- Galenopsis
- Garthiope
- Gastrodorus
- Gecchelicarcinus
- Gemmacarcinus
- Gemmellarocarcinus
- Geothelphusa
- Gillcarcinus
- Glabropilumnus
- Glaessneropsis
- Glebocarcinus
- Globihexapus
- Glyphithyreus
- Glyptodynomene
- Glyptoxanthus
- Gollincarcinus
- Gomezinus
- Goneplax
- Goniochele
- Goniocypoda
- Goniodromites
- Graptocarcinus
- Guinotosia
- Halimede
- Harenacorystes
- Harpactocarcinus
- Harpactoxanthopsis
- Haydnella
- Hebertides
- Heeia
- Heikeopsis
- Hemigrapsus
- Hemioon
- Hepatella
- Hepatinulus
- Hepatiscus
- Hepatus
- Herbstia
- Heteractaea
- Heteronucia
- Heteropanope
- Heus
- Hexapanopeus
- Hexapus
- Hillius
- Holcocarcinus
- Homelys
- Homola
- Homoliformis
- Homolodromia
- Homolopsis
- Hoplitocarcinus
- Hyas
- Hyastenus
- Hypocolpus
- Ibericancer
- Icriocarcinus
- Ilia
- Iliacantha
- Inachus
- Iphiculus
- Ixa
- Jacquinotia
- Jakobsenius
- Jonesius
- Karasawaia
- Kerepesia
- Kierionopsis
- Kowaicarcinus
- Kromtitis
- Lachnopodus
- Laevicarcinus
- Laeviprosopon
- Laleonectes
- Lambropsis
- Lathahypossia
- Latheticocarcinus
- Latulambrus
- Lecythocaris
- Leiolambrus
- Leptodius
- Leptomithrax
- Lessinioplax
- Leucosia
- Leucosilia
- Leurocyclus
- Levicyclus
- Liagore
- Lianira
- Libinia
- Libystes
- Lignihomola
- Liocarcinus
- Liocaris
- Liomera
- Lipaesthesius
- Lissocarcinus
- Lissopsis
- Lithophylax
- Litograpsus
- Lobocarcinus
- Lobogalenopsis
- Lobonotus
- Lobulata
- Loerentheya
- Loerenthopluma
- Londinimola
- Longodromites
- Longusorbis
- Lophopanopeus
- Lophoranina
- Lovarina
- Loxorhynchus
- Lucanthonisia
- Lupeites
- Lupocyclus
- Lydia
- Lyreidina
- Lyreidus
- Macroacaena
- Macrocheira
- Macromedaeus
- Macrophthalmus
- Macropipus
- Maeandricampus
- Magyarcarcinus
- Maingrapsus
- Mainhepatiscus
- Maja
- Marocarcinus
- Martinetta
- Martinocarcinus
- Marycarcinus
- Mascaranada
- Matutites
- Maurimia
- Medaeops
- Medaeus
- Medorippe
- Megamia
- Megaxantho
- Megokkos
- Menippe
- Mesodromilites
- Mesolambrus
- Mesorhoea
- Metacarcinus
- Metopograpsus
- Metopoxantho
- Micippa
- Microcorystes
- Microdium
- Micromaia
- Micromithrax
- Micropanope
- Minohellenus
- Miocyclus
- Miograpsus
- Miopipus
- Mioplax
- Miosesarma
- Mioxaiva
- Mithracia
- Mithracites
- Mithraculus
- Mithrax
- Monodaeus
- Montezumella
- Mursia
- Mursilata
- Mursilia
- Mursiopsis
- Myra
- Nanocassiope
- Nanomaja
- Nanoplax
- Necora
- Necrocarcinus
- Necronectes
- Nemausa
- Neodorippe
- Neoliomera
- Neomeria
- Neosarmatium
- Neozanthopsis
- Neptocarcinus
- Nipponopon
- Nitotacarcinus
- Nobilum
- Nodoprosopon
- Noetlingia
- Nogarolia
- Notocarcinus
- Notomithrax
- Notopocorystes
- Notopoides
- Notopus
- Notosceles
- Nucia
- Nucilobus
- Nursia
- Ocalina
- Ocypode
- Oedisoma
- Olinaecaris
- Ommatocarcinus
- Oonoton
- Ophthalmoplax
- Orbitoplax
- Oregonia
- Orithopsis
- Orthakrolophos
- Osachila
- Ovalipes
- Ovamene
- Oxythyreus
- Ozius
- Pachygrapsus
- Pakicarcinus
- Palaeocarpilius
- Palaeodromites
- Palaeograpsus
- Palaeomyra
- Palaeopinnixa
- Palaeopsopheticus
- Palaeotrichia
- Palaeoxantho
- Palaeoxanthops
- Palaeoxanthopsis
- Palehomola
- Palicus
- Palmyria
- Panopeus
- Panticarcinus
- Paracleistostoma
- Paracorallicarcinus
- Paractaea
- Paracyclois
- Paradorippe
- Paradoxicarcinus
- Paranecrocarcinus
- Paranursia
- Paraocalina
- Parapirimela
- Paratetralia
- Parathranites
- Paratumidocarcinus
- Paraverrucoides
- Paraxanthias
- Paraxanthosia
- Pariphiculus
- Paromola
- Paromolopsis
- Parthenope
- Peloeus
- Periacanthus
- Persephona
- Phalangites
- Philyra
- Phlyctenodes
- Phrynolambrus
- Pilodius
- Pilumnomimus
- Pilumnopeus
- Pilumnus
- Pinnixa
- Pinnotheres
- Pirimela
- Pisa
- Pisoides
- Pisomaja
- Pitho
- Pithonoton
- Plagiophthalmus
- Planes
- Planoprosopon
- Platepistoma
- Platylambrus
- Platypodia
- Pleolobites
- Pliopirimela
- Podocatactes
- Podophthalmus
- Polycnemidium
- Pororaria
- Portufuria
- Portumnus
- Portunites
- Portunus
- Potamon
- Potamonautes
- Preclarocarcinus
- Pregeryona
- Prehepatus
- Priabonella
- Priabonocarcinus
- Prochlorodius
- Prohomola
- Prosopon
- Proterocarcinus
- Protuberosa
- Proxicarpilius
- Psammocarcinus
- Psammograpsus
- Pseudoachelous
- Pseudocarcinus
- Pseudodaranyia
- Pseudohepatiscus
- Pseudomicippe
- Pseudonecrocarcinus
- Pseudophilyra
- Pseudophlyctenodes
- Pseudorhombila
- Psopheticus
- Psygmophthalmus
- Pterocarcinus
- Pugettia
- Pulalius
- Pyromaia
- Quasilaeviranina
- Rakosia
- Randallia
- Ranidina
- Ranilia
- Raniliformis
- Ranina
- Raninella
- Raninoides
- Rathbunopon
- Remia
- Retrocypoda
- Retropluma
- Rhachiosoma
- Rhinodromia
- Rhinolambrus
- Rhinopoupinia
- Rocacarcinus
- Rochinia
- Roemerus
- Rogueus
- Romaleon
- Rugafarius
- Sabahranina
- Sabellidromites
- Sandomingia
- Santeecarcinus
- Santeella
- Santeexanthus
- Sarahcarcinus
- Saratunus
- Schizophroida
- Schizophrys
- Sculptoplax
- Scylla
- Scyra
- Secretanella
- Seorsus
- Sereneopeus
- Serenius
- Sesarma
- Sestrostoma
- Sharnia
- Shazella
- Silvacarcinus
- Simonellia
- Sodakus
- Speleophorus
- Speocarcinus
- Spinipalicus
- Stenocionops
- Stenodromia
- Stenorhynchus
- Stephanometopon
- Stevea
- Stintonius
- Stoaplax
- Styrioplax
- Sylviocarcinus
- Symethis
- Syphax
- Szaboa
- Tanidromites
- Tanzanonautes
- Tasadia
- Tehuacana
- Telamonocarcinus
- Teleophrys
- Tenuihomola
- Tepexicarcinus
- Tetracarcinus
- Tetralia
- Tetraxanthus
- Thalamita
- Thalamitoides
- Thelecarcinus
- Thelphusograpsus
- Thia
- Thoe
- Titanocarcinus
- Titanodorippe
- Tithonohomola
- Tokoyo
- Tongapapaka
- Torynomma
- Trachynotocarcinus
- Trachypirimela
- Trapezia (crab)
- Trechmannius
- Tribolocephalus
- Trichopeltarion
- Tritodynamia
- Tumidocarcinus
- Tutankhamen
- Tutus
- Tylocarcinus
- Tymolus
- Typhlocarcinus
- Typilobus
- Uca
- Uhlias
- Umalia
- Urnalana
- Utica
- Vanuachela
- Vectis
- Verrucarcinus
- Verrucoides
- Viacarcinus
- Viaophthalmus
- Viapinnixa
- Viaplax
- Wanga
- Wilmingtonia
- Wilsonimaia
- Withersella
- Woodbinax
- Wulaicarcinus
- Xaiva
- Xandaros
- Xanthias
- Xanthilites
- Xantho
- Xanthodius
- Xanthosia
- Xanthosioides
- Xeinostoma
- Xenophthalmus
- Zanthopsis
- Zaops
- Zosimus
- Zygastrocarcinus

== Order Aeschronectida ==
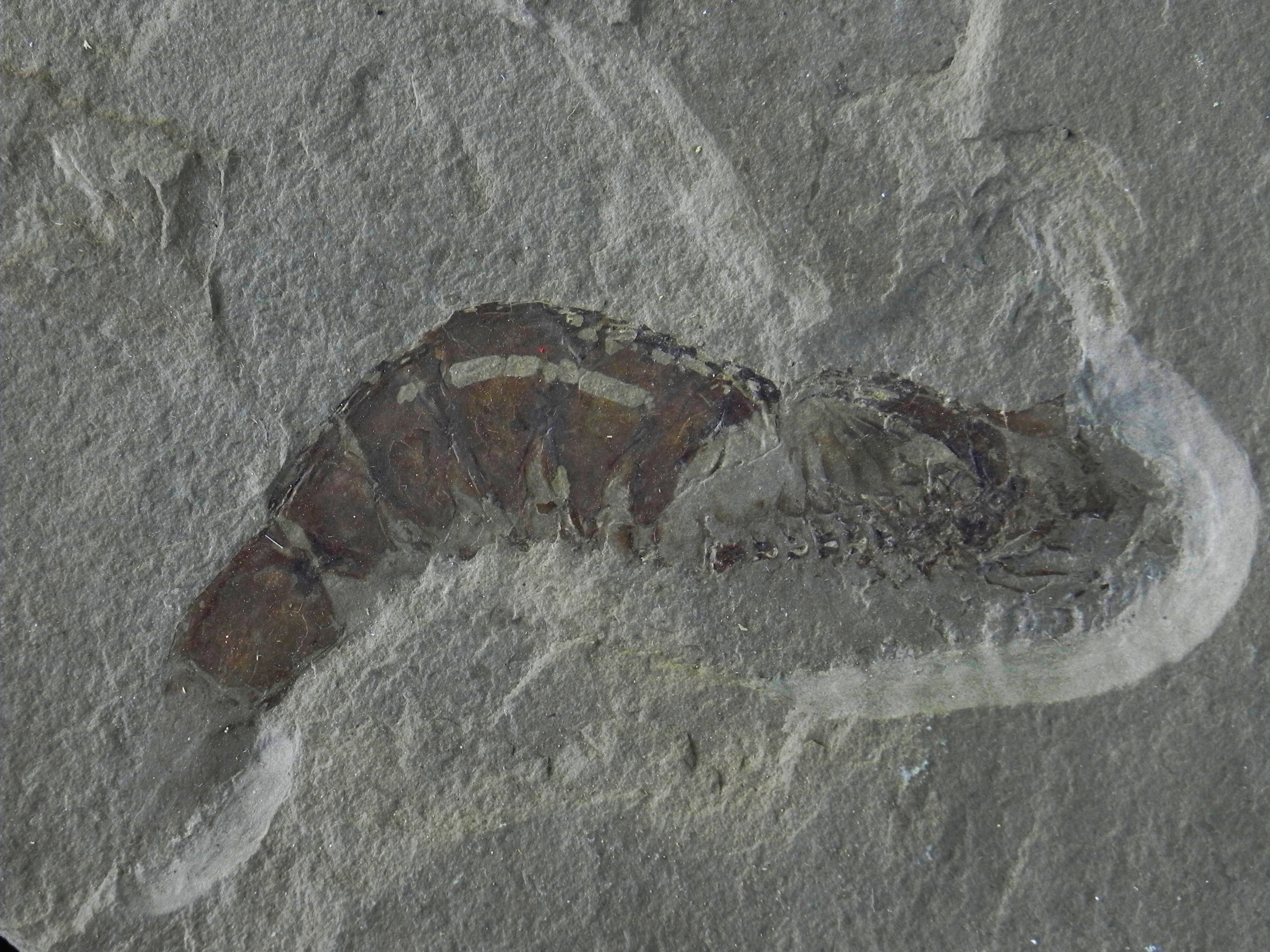
†Aenigmacaris cornigerum SCHRAM & HORNER 1979 from the Mississippian Heath Formation of Bear Gulch, Montana

- Aenigmacaris
- Aratidecthes
- Crangopsis
- Joanellia
- Kallidecthes

== Order Amphipoda ==
- Gammarus
- Melita
- Praegmelina

== Order Angustidontida ==
- Angustidontus
- Schramidontus

== Order Archaeostraca ==
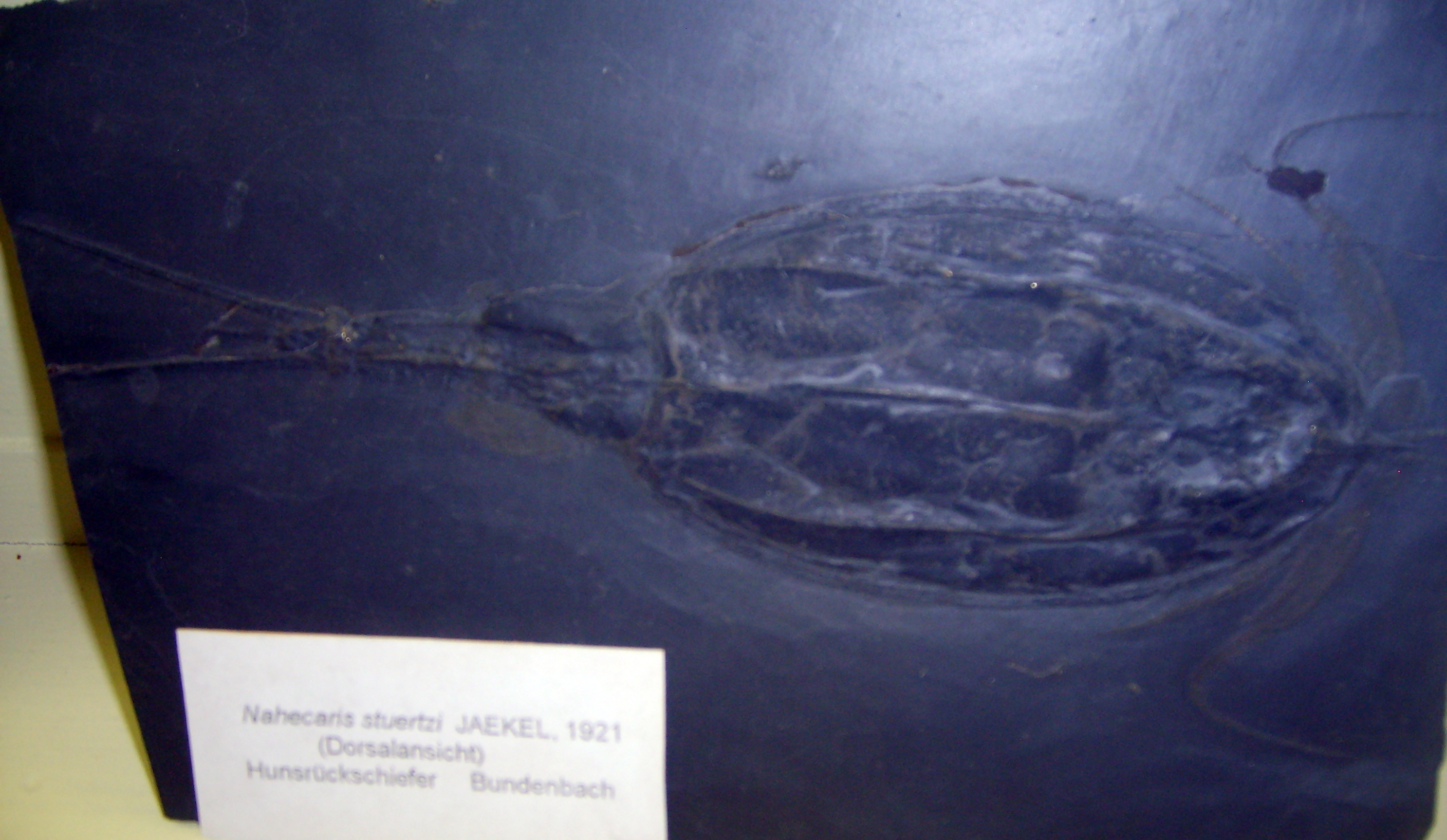
Nahecaris stuertzi at the Museum für Naturkunde, Berlin

- Aristozoe
- Baituganocaris
- Callizoe
- Caryocaris
- Ceratiocaris
- Dilophaspis
- Dithyrocaris
- Echinocaris
- Eleutherocaris
- Elymocaris
- Gonatocaris
- Guerichicaris
- Hebertocaris
- Heroldina
- Kerfornecaris
- Lebesconteia
- Macrocaris
- Montecaris
- Nahecaris
- Ohiocaris
- Orozoe
- Pephricaris
- Ptychocaris
- Pygocaris
- Rhinocaris
- Schugurocaris
- Trigonocarys
- Tropidocaris

== Order Belotelsonidea ==
- Belotelson

== Order Cumacea ==
- Nannastacus
- Palaeocuma

== Order Eocaridacea ==
- Anthracophausia
- Devonocaris
- Eocaris
- Essoidea
- Palaemysis

== Order Hoplostraca ==
- Kellibrooksia
- Sairocaris

== Order Hymenostraca ==
- Hymenocaris

== Order Isopoda ==
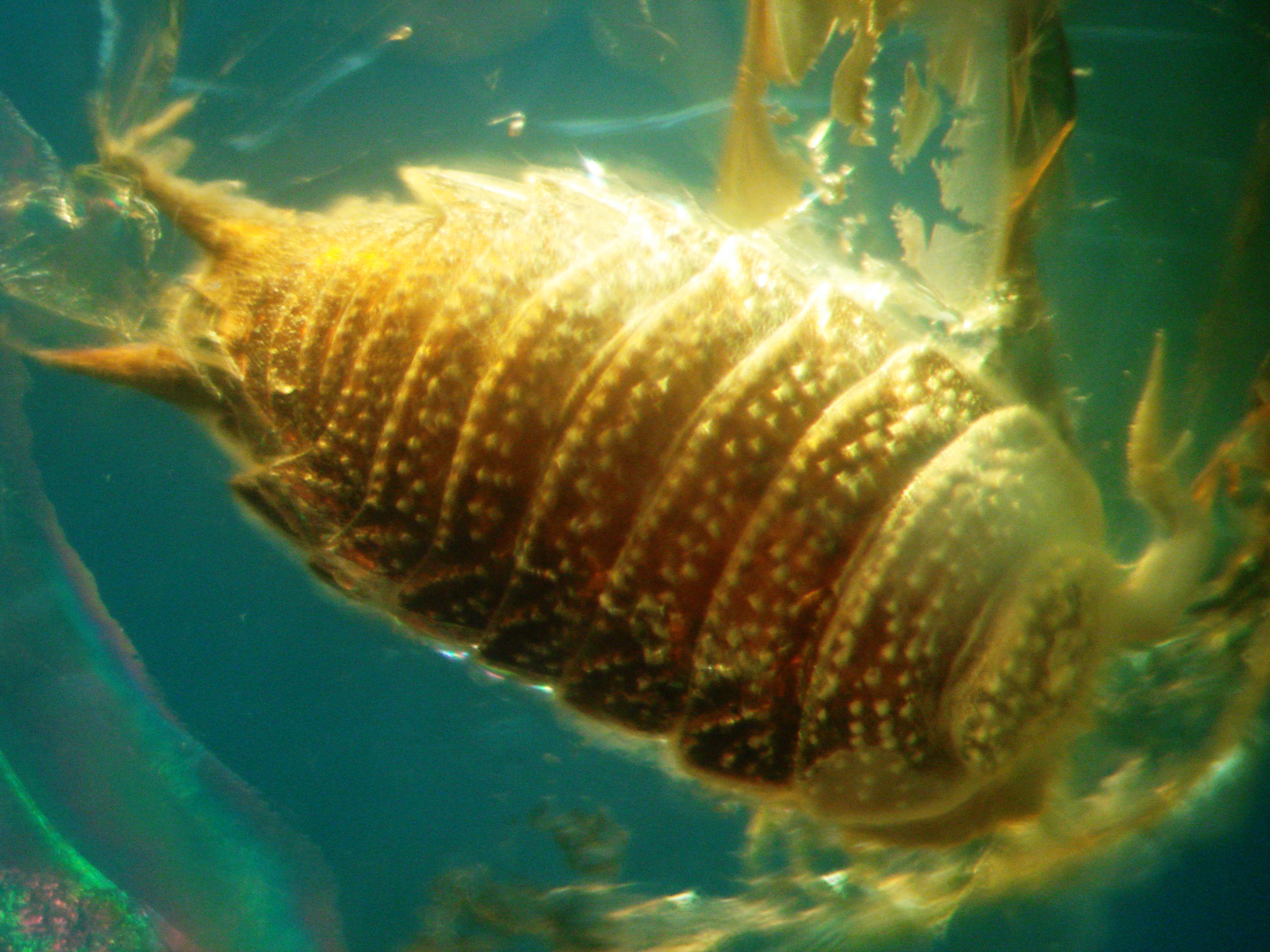
Isopod inclusion in Baltic amber (Eocene)

- Anhelkocephalon
- Archaeoniscus
- Archaeosphaeroma
- Cirolana
- Cyclosphaeroma
- Cymatoga
- Cymodoce
- Elioserolis
- Eocopea
- Eosphaeroma
- Hesslerella
- Heterosphaeroma
- Isopodites
- Palaega
- Palaeocrangon
- Palaeophreatoicus
- Proidotea
- Protamphisopus
- Protosphaeroma
- Saduria
- Sphaeroma
- Triassphaeroma
- Unusuropode
- Urda

== Order Leptostraca ==
- Rhabdouraea

== Order Lophogastrida ==
- Eucopia
- Lophogaster
- Peachocaris
- Schimperella

== Order Mysidacea ==
- Anthracaris
- Bellocaris
- Elder
- Francocaris
- Jerometichenoria
- Mamayocaris
- Notocaris
- Paramysis
- Paulocaris
- Pseudogalathea
- Pseudotealliocaris
- Pygocephalus
- Siriella
- Tylerocaris

== Order Palaeostomatopoda ==
- Archaeocaris
- Bairdops
- Eopteridium

== Phyllocarida incertae sedis ==
- Aptychopsis
- Discinocaris
- Peltocaris
- Protocimex

== Order Stomatopoda ==
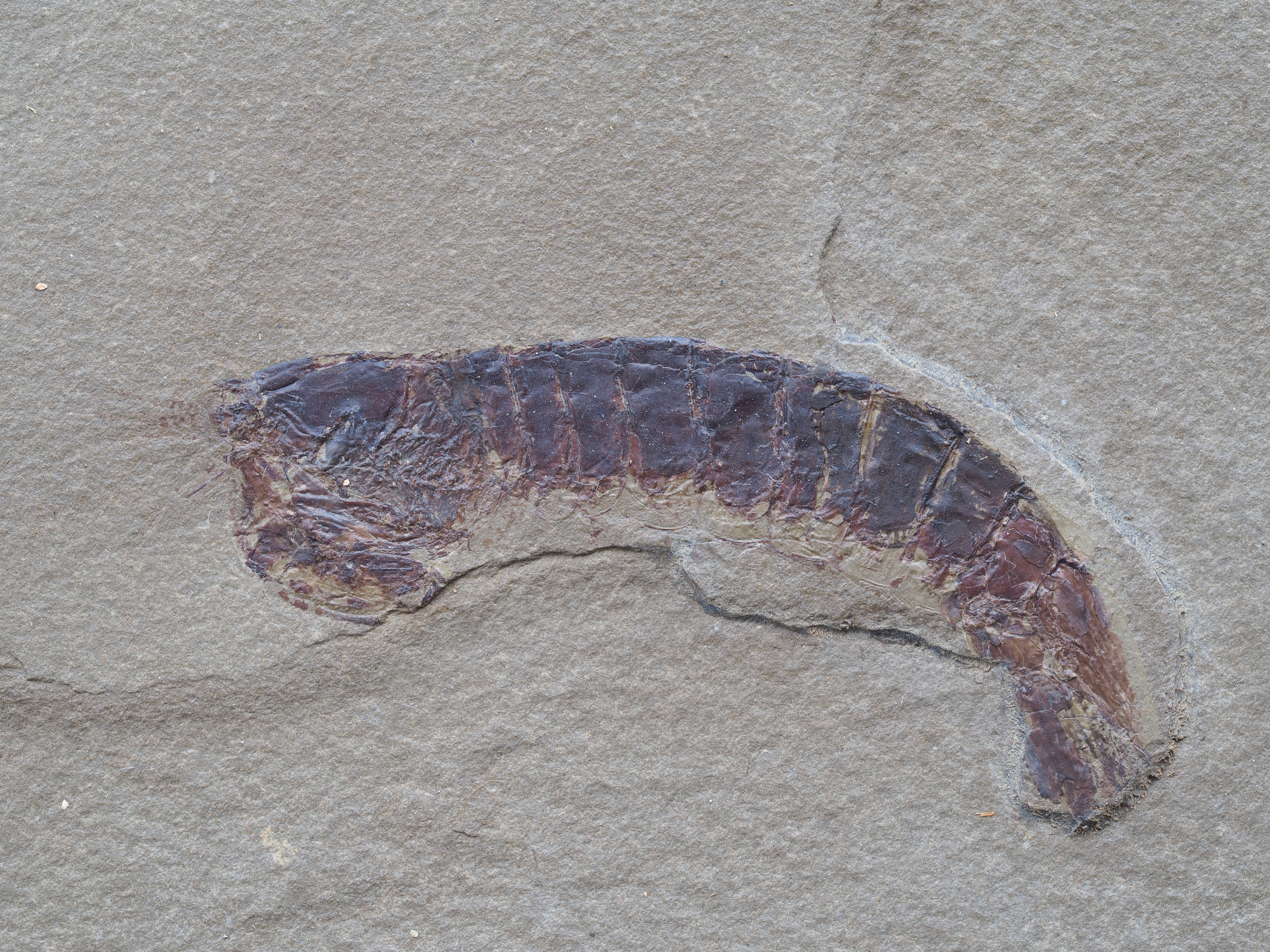
†Tyrannophontes acanthocercus from the Mississippian Heath Formation of Bear Gulch, Montana

- Angelosquilla
- Bathysquilla
- Chloridella
- Gonodactylus
- Gorgonophontes
- Hemisquilla
- Lysiosquilla
- Palaeosquilla
- Perimecturus
- Pseudosculda
- Pseudosquilla
- Sculda
- Squilla
- Topangasquilla
- Triassosculda
- Tyrannophontes
- Tyrannosculda

== Order Tanaidacea ==
- Acadiocaris
- Anthracocaris
- Carlclausus
- Cretitanais
- Eucryptocaris
- Jurapseudes
- Ophthalmapseudes
- Palaeotanais

== Order Waterstonellidea ==
- Waterstonella

== See also ==
- List of prehistoric barnacles
- List of prehistoric brittle stars
- List of prehistoric sea cucumbers
- List of crinoid genera
- List of trilobite genera
