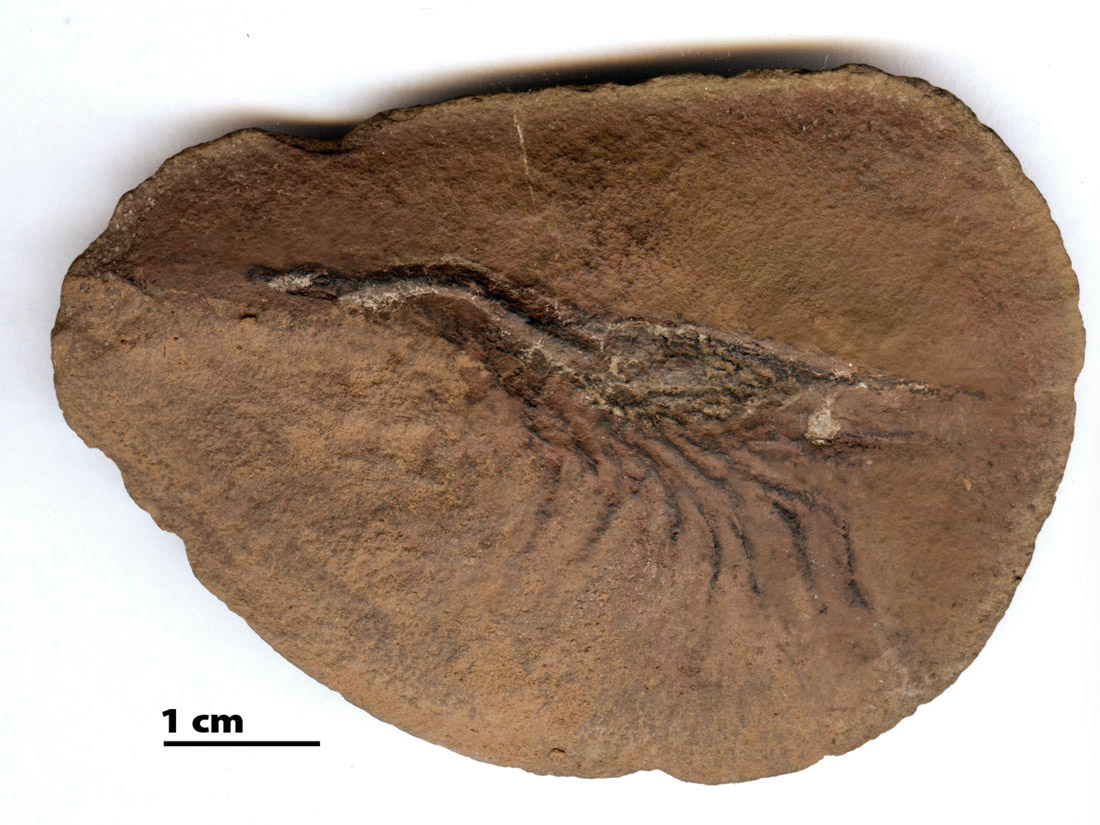
- Peachocaris strongi

Scientific classification
- Kingdom: Animalia
- Phylum: Arthropoda
- Clade: Pancrustacea
- Class: Malacostraca
- Order: Lophogastrida
- Family: †Peachocarididae; Schram, 1986
- Genus: †Peachocaris; Schram, 1976

Species
- Peachocaris acanthouraea Shram, 1984; Peachocaris strongi (Brooks, 1962)

= Peachocaris =

Peachocaris Temporal range: Late Carboniferous

Extinct genus of crustaceans

Peachocaris is a genus of extinct crustaceans in the order Lophogastrida containing at least two species. It is the only genus in the family Peachocarididae. Peachocaris were small shrimp-like crustacean that lived in the shallow seas of the late Carboniferous (Pennsylvanian). The species Peachocaris strongi is found in the Mazon Creek fossil beds, a carboniferous lagerstätte in Illinois.

The genus was named by Frederick Schram in 1974. It is named after the British paleontologist Ben Peach who provided significant contributions to the early study of Carboniferous Malacostraca.

== See also ==
- List of prehistoric malacostracans
