= Liomera supernodosa =

Scientific classification
- Kingdom: Animalia
- Phylum: Arthropoda
- Class: Malacostraca
- Order: Decapoda
- Suborder: Pleocyemata
- Infraorder: Brachyura
- Family: Xanthidae
- Genus: Liomera
- Species: L. supernodosa

Binomial name
- Liomera supernodosa (Rathbun, 1906)

Species of crabs

Liomera supernodosa, formerly known as Carpilodes supernodosa, is a species of crab in the family Xanthidae. Its common name is knotted liomera.

== Description ==
Liomera supernodosa has a knotted carapace and distinct color of yellow and brown to orange and red color. Males can reach the size of 11.8 millimeters vertically and 20.2 millimeters horizontally. At present, there is no information about females.

== Distribution and habitat ==
Liomera supernodosa is endemic to the Hawaiian Islands and is mostly found in the Northwestern Hawaiian Islands. The species has been found on Pearl and Hermes Reef & Laysan Island.

== Conservation ==
Liomera supernodosa is on a protection list that is sanctioned by United States Fish and Wildlife Service and planned by Hawaii Department of Land and Natural Resources designed for crabs at risk of extinction to be monitor and checked.
