= Archaeogeryon =

Archaeogeryon Temporal range: Early Miocene ~23–16 Ma

Scientific classification
- Kingdom: Animalia
- Phylum: Arthropoda
- Clade: Pancrustacea
- Class: Malacostraca
- Order: Decapoda
- Suborder: Pleocyemata
- Infraorder: Brachyura
- Family: Portunidae
- Subfamily: Polybiinae
- Genus: †Archaeogeryon; Colosi, 1924

Type species
- Archaeogeryon fuegianus Colosi, 1924

Other species
- Archaeogeryon corsolini Casadio, 2004; Archaeogeryon latus Glaessner, 1933; Archaeogeryon lophos Feldmann et al., 1995; Archaeogeryon lophosdup Feldmann, 1995; Archaeogeryon navidad Feldmann, 2005

Extinct genus of crabs

Archaeogeryon is an extinct genus of crab from the Miocene.
