= Kellibrooksia =

Kellibrooksia Temporal range: Middle Pennsylvanian

Scientific classification
- Kingdom: Animalia
- Phylum: Arthropoda
- Clade: Pancrustacea
- Class: Malacostraca
- Order: †Hoplostraca
- Family: †Sairocarididae
- Genus: †Kellibrooksia; Schram, 1973
- Species: †K. macrogaster

Binomial name
- †Kellibrooksia macrogaster Schram, 1973

Extinct genus of crustaceans

Kellibrooksia is an extinct genus of crustacean in the order Hoplostraca from the Middle Pennsylvanian.
