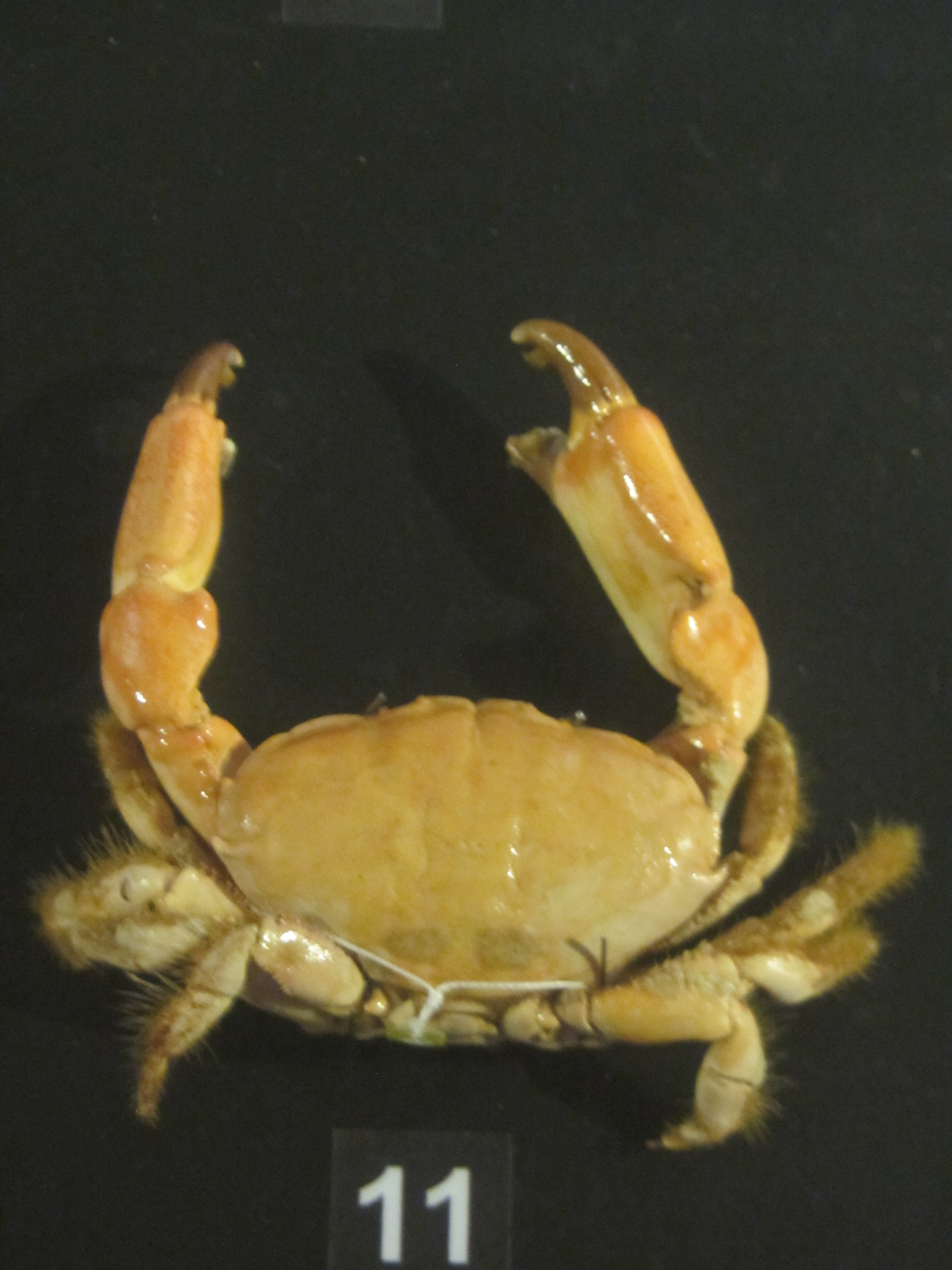
- Lachnopodus subacutus

Scientific classification
- Domain: Eukaryota
- Kingdom: Animalia
- Phylum: Arthropoda
- Class: Malacostraca
- Order: Decapoda
- Suborder: Pleocyemata
- Infraorder: Brachyura
- Family: Xanthidae
- Genus: Lachnopodus; Stimpson, 1858

= Lachnopodus =

Genus of crabs

Lachnopodus is a genus of crabs in the family Xanthidae, containing the following species:

- Lachnopodus bidentatus (A. Milne-Edwards, 1867)
- Lachnopodus gibsonhilli (Tweedie, 1950)
- Lachnopodus ponapensis (Rathbun, 1907)
- Lachnopodus rodgersi Stimpson, 1858
- Lachnopodus subacutus (Stimpson, 1858)
- Lachnopodus tahitensis De Man, 1889
