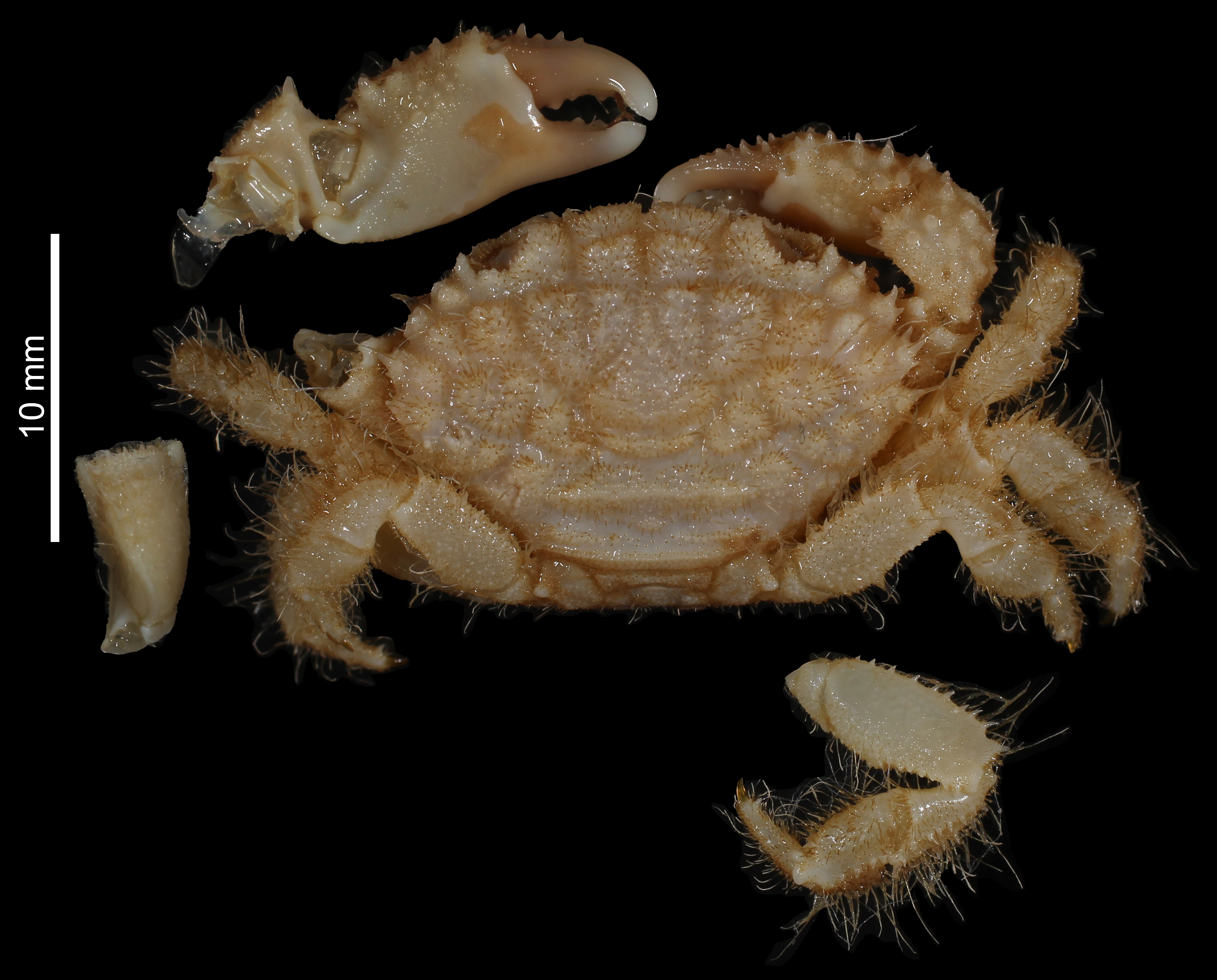
- Pilodius maotieni

Scientific classification
- Kingdom: Animalia
- Phylum: Arthropoda
- Clade: Pancrustacea
- Class: Malacostraca
- Order: Decapoda
- Suborder: Pleocyemata
- Infraorder: Brachyura
- Family: Xanthidae
- Subfamily: Chlorodiellinae
- Genus: Pilodius; Dana, 1851

= Pilodius =

Genus of crabs

Pilodius is a genus of crabs in the family Xanthidae, containing the following species:

- Pilodius areolatus H. Milne-Edwards, 1834)
- Pilodius cephalalgicus Clark & Galil, 1993
- Pilodius concors Clark & Galil, 1993
- Pilodius flavus Rathbun, 1894
- Pilodius granulatus Stimpson, 1858
- Pilodius maotieni Serène, 1971
- Pilodius miersi (Ward, 1936)
- Pilodius moranti Clark & Galil, 1993
- Pilodius nigrocrinitus Stimpson, 1859
- Pilodius paumotensis Rathbun, 1907
- Pilodius philippinensis (Ward, 1941)
- Pilodius pilumnoides (White, 1848)
- Pilodius pubescens Dana, 1852
- Pilodius pugil Dana, 1852
- Pilodius scabriculus Dana, 1852
- Pilodius spinipes Heller, 1861
