= Arcania =

Arcania may refer to:

- Arcania: Gothic 4, a video game
- Arcania: Fall of Setarrif, a video game

== See also ==
- Coenonympha arcania, the pearly heath, a butterfly species
