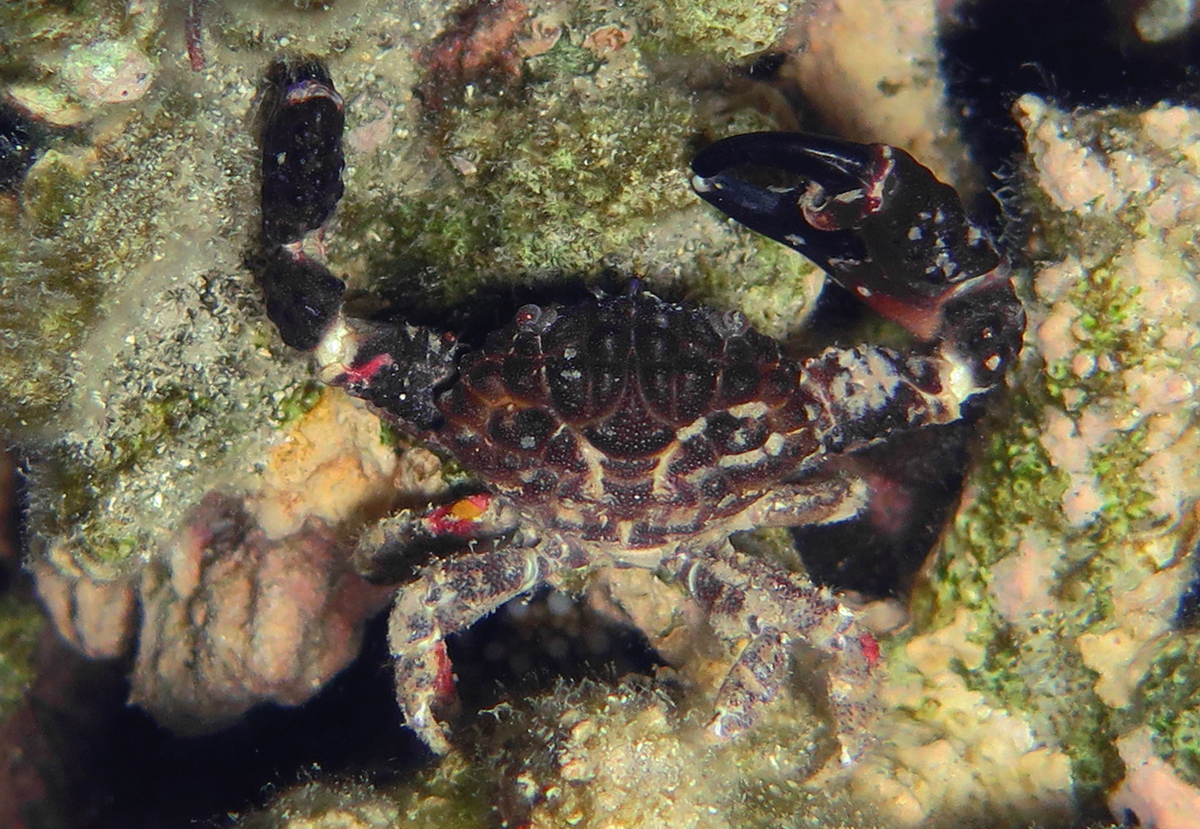
- Cyclodius obscurus

Scientific classification
- Domain: Eukaryota
- Kingdom: Animalia
- Phylum: Arthropoda
- Class: Malacostraca
- Order: Decapoda
- Suborder: Pleocyemata
- Infraorder: Brachyura
- Family: Xanthidae
- Subfamily: Chlorodiellinae
- Genus: Cyclodius; Dana, 1851

= Cyclodius =

Genus of crabs

Cyclodius is a genus of crabs in the family Xanthidae, containing the following species:

- Cyclodius drachi (Guinot, 1964)
- Cyclodius granulatus (Targioni-Tozzetti, 1877)
- Cyclodius granulosus De Man, 1888
- Cyclodius nitidus (Dana, 1852)
- Cyclodius obscurus (Hombron & Jacquinot, 1846)
- Cyclodius paumotensis (Rathbun, 1907)
- Cyclodius perlatus (Nobili, 1905)
- Cyclodius ungulatus (H. Milne-Edwards, 1834)
