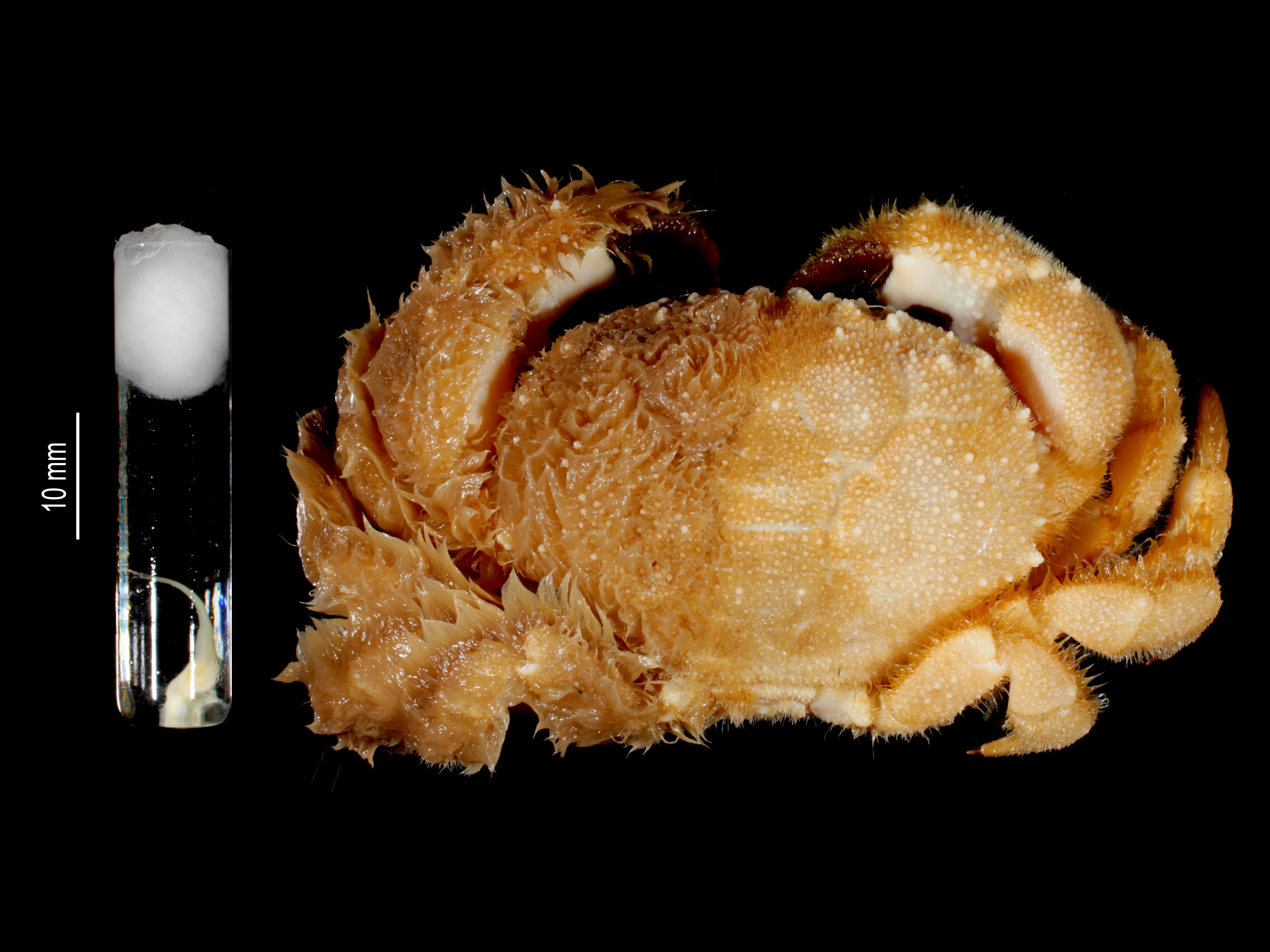
- Banareia fatuhiva

Scientific classification
- Domain: Eukaryota
- Kingdom: Animalia
- Phylum: Arthropoda
- Class: Malacostraca
- Order: Decapoda
- Suborder: Pleocyemata
- Infraorder: Brachyura
- Family: Xanthidae
- Subfamily: Banareiinae
- Genus: Banareia; A. Milne-Edwards, 1869

= Banareia =

Genus of crabs

Banareia is a genus of crabs in the family Xanthidae, containing the following species:

- Banareia acies (Rathbun, 1911)
- Banareia armata A. Milne Edwards, 1869
- Banareia australis (Ward, 1936)
- Banareia balssi Guinot, 1976
- Banareia banareias (Rathbun, 1911)
- Banareia fatuhiva Davie, 1992
- Banareia inconspicua Miers, 1884
- Banareia japonica (Odhner, 1925)
- Banareia kraussi (Heller, 1861)
- Banareia nobilii (Odhner, 1925)
- Banareia odhneri Sakai, 1974
- Banareia palmeri (Rathbun, 1894)
- Banareia parvula (Krauss, 1843)
- Banareia serenei Guinot, 1976
- Banareia subglobosa (Stimpson, 1858)
- Banareia villosa Rathbun, 1906
