= Pleopteryx =

Pleopteryx Temporal range: Late Jurassic (Tithonian)

Scientific classification
- Kingdom: Animalia
- Phylum: Arthropoda
- Class: Malacostraca
- Order: Decapoda
- Suborder: Pleocyemata
- Infraorder: Caridea
- Superfamily: †Pleopteryxoidea; Schweigert & Garassino, 2004
- Family: †Pleopteryxidae; Schweigert & Garassino, 2004
- Genus: †Pleopteryx; Schweigert & Garassino, 2004
- Species: †P. kuempeli

Binomial name
- †Pleopteryx kuempeli Schweigert & Garassino, 2004

Extinct genus of decapods

Pleopteryx is an extinct genus of true shrimp in the family Pleopteryxidae, of which it is also the sole member. It lived in what is now modern day Bavaria during the Tithonian stage of the Late Jurassic Epoch.

Its type and only species is Pleopteryx kuempeli.
