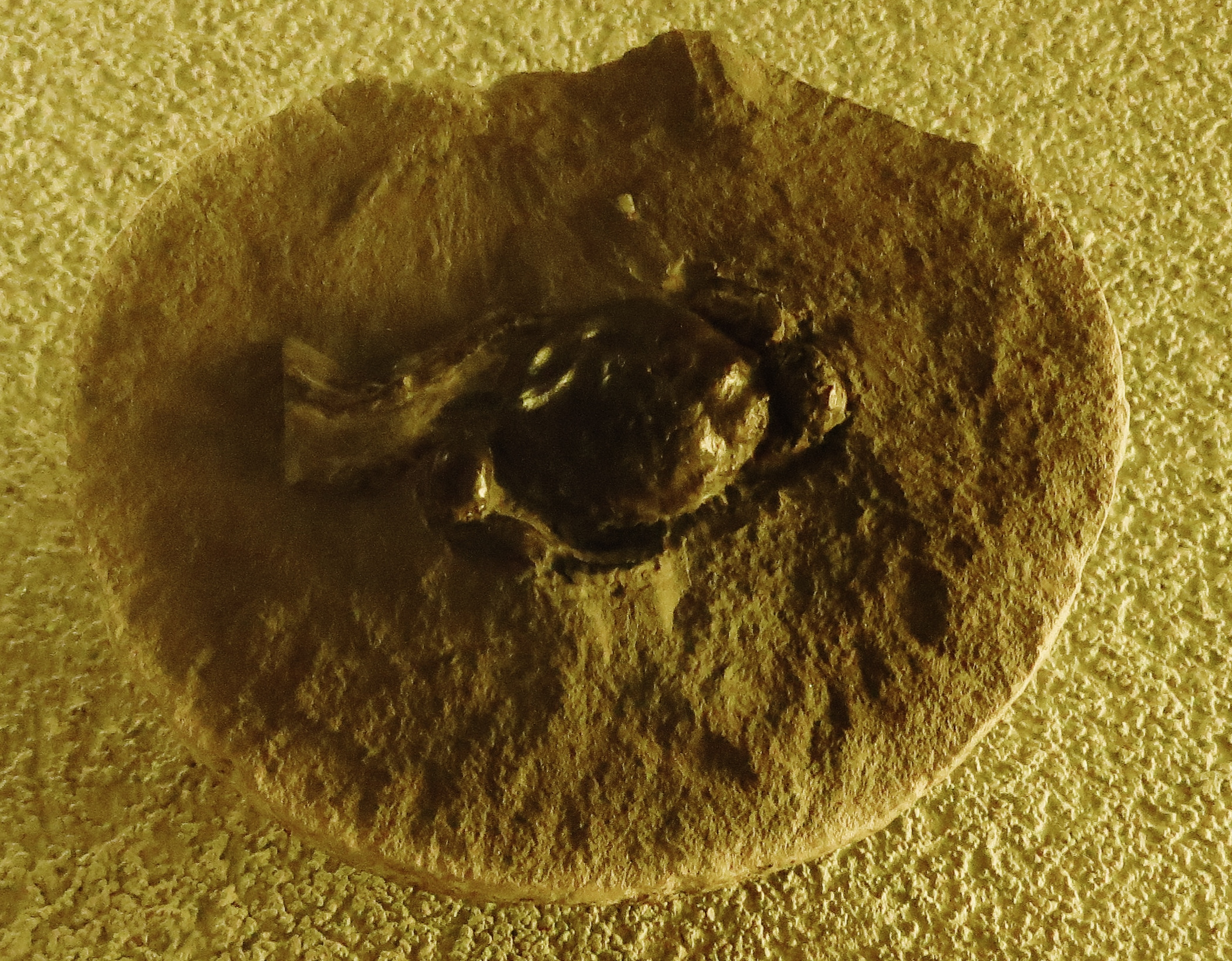
- Portunites alaskensis fossil

Scientific classification
- Domain: Eukaryota
- Kingdom: Animalia
- Phylum: Arthropoda
- Class: Malacostraca
- Order: Decapoda
- Suborder: Pleocyemata
- Infraorder: Brachyura
- Family: Polybiidae
- Genus: †Portunites; Bell, 1858

= Portunites =

Portunites Temporal range: Eocene–Neogene

Extinct genus of crabs

Portunites is an extinct genus of decapod in the family Polybiidae. There are about 12 described species in Portunites.

== Species ==
These 12 species belong to the genus Portunites:

- † Portunites alaskensis Rathbun, 1926
- † Portunites angustata Collins et al., 1999
- † Portunites eocenica Lorenthey, 1929
- † Portunites hoepfneri Moths, 2005
- † Portunites incerta Bell, 1857
- † Portunites kattachiensis Karasawa, 1992
- † Portunites nodosus Schweitzer & Feldmann, 2000
- † Portunites rosenfeldi De Angeli & Garassino, 2006
- † Portunites stintoni Quayle, 1984
- † Portunites sylviae Quayle & Collins, 1981
- † Portunites insculpta Rathbun, 1926
- † Portunites triangulum Rathbun
