= Lipaesthesius =

Scientific classification
- Domain: Eukaryota
- Kingdom: Animalia
- Phylum: Arthropoda
- Class: Malacostraca
- Order: Decapoda
- Suborder: Pleocyemata
- Infraorder: Brachyura
- Family: Xanthidae
- Genus: Lipaesthesius; Rathbun, 1898
- Species: L. leeanus

Binomial name
- Lipaesthesius leeanus Rathbun, 1898

Genus of crabs

Lipaesthesius leeanus is a species of crab in the family Xanthidae, the only species in the genus Lipaesthesius.
