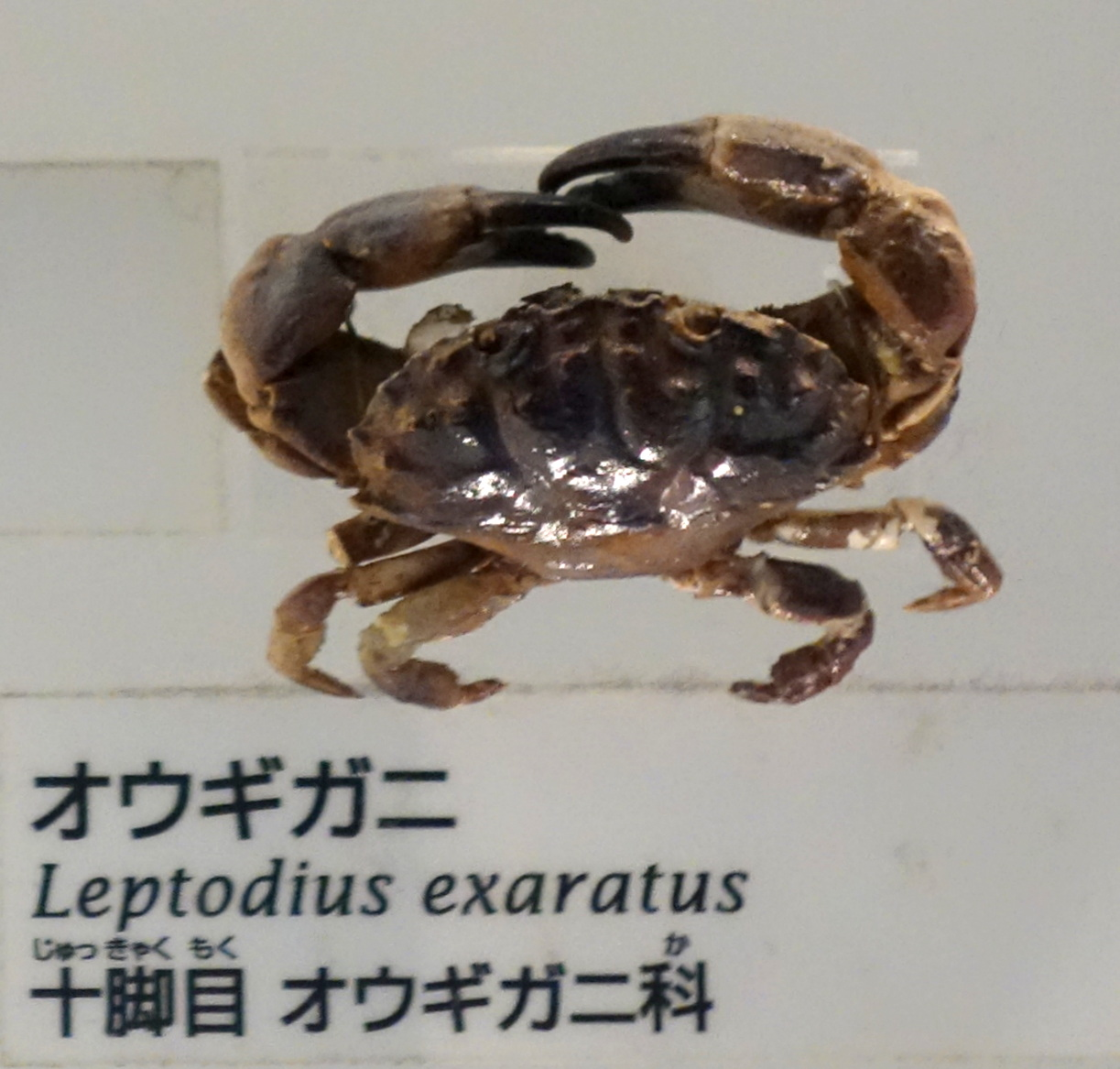
- Leptodius exaratus

Scientific classification
- Domain: Eukaryota
- Kingdom: Animalia
- Phylum: Arthropoda
- Class: Malacostraca
- Order: Decapoda
- Suborder: Pleocyemata
- Infraorder: Brachyura
- Family: Xanthidae
- Genus: Leptodius; A. Milne-Edwards, 1863

= Leptodius =

Genus of crabs

Leptodius is a genus of crabs in the family Xanthidae, containing the following species:

- Leptodius australis Ward, 1936
- Leptodius davaoensis Ward, 1941
- Leptodius efferens Rathbun, 1907
- Leptodius exaratus (H. Milne Edwards, 1834)
- Leptodius gracilis (Dana, 1852)
- Leptodius hombronii (Lucas, 1853)
- Leptodius nigromaculatus Serene, 1962
- Leptodius nudipes (Dana, 1852)
- Leptodius philippinensis Ward, 1941
- Leptodius planus Ward, 1934
- Leptodius sanguineus (H. Milne Edwards, 1834)
- Leptodius waialuanus Rathbun, 1906
