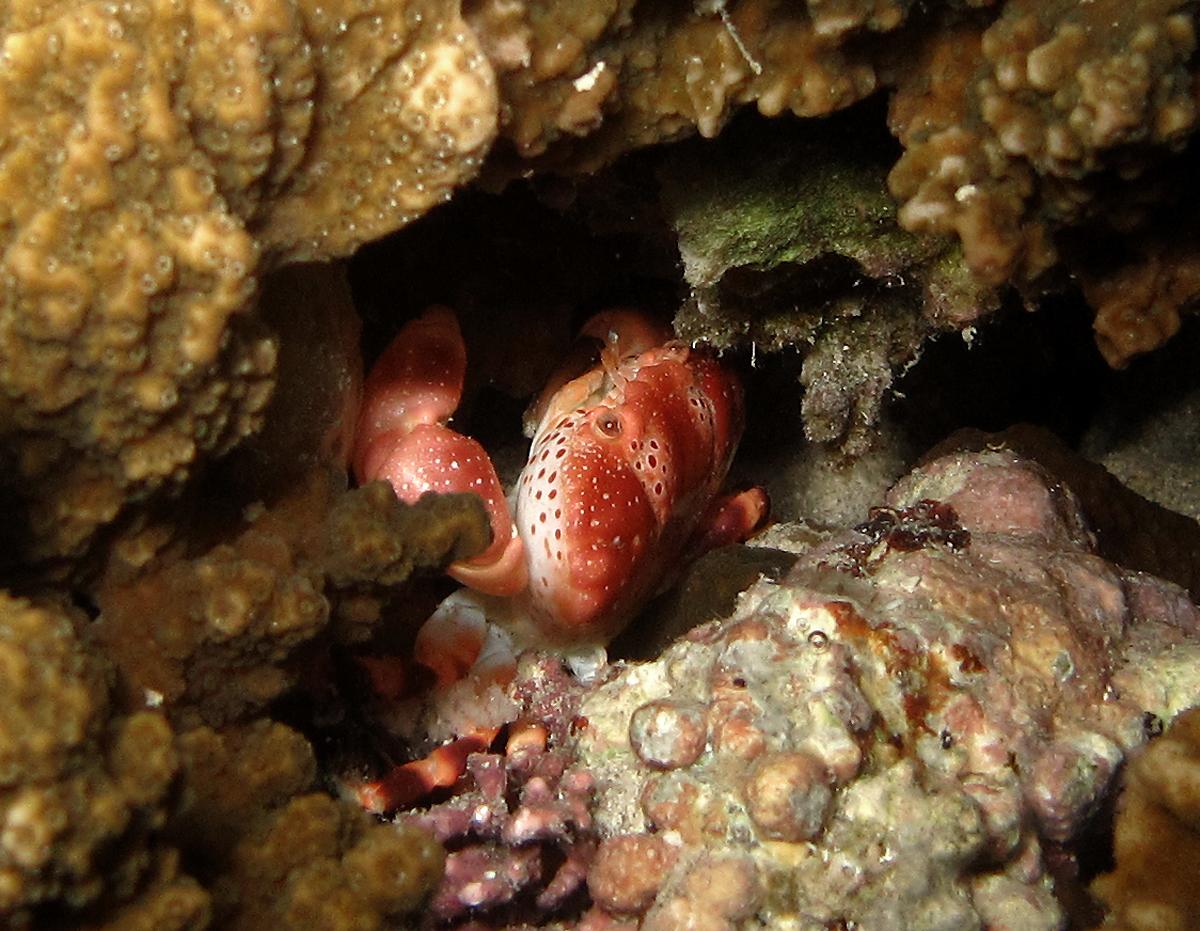
- Xanthias punctatus

Scientific classification
- Kingdom: Animalia
- Phylum: Arthropoda
- Class: Malacostraca
- Order: Decapoda
- Suborder: Pleocyemata
- Infraorder: Brachyura
- Family: Xanthidae
- Subfamily: Xanthinae
- Genus: Xanthias; Rathbun, 1897

Type species
- Xanthias lamarckii (H. Milne Edwards, 1834)

= Xanthias (crab) =

Genus of crabs

Xanthias is a genus of crabs in the family Xanthidae, containing two exclusively fossil species and the following extant species:

- Xanthias canaliculatus Rathbun, 1906
- Xanthias cherbonnieri Guinot, 1964
- Xanthias claudiae Mendoza, 2023
- Xanthias dawsoni Takeda & Webber, 2006
- Xanthias gilbertensis Balss, 1938
- Xanthias glabrous Edmondson, 1951
- Xanthias inornatus (Rathbun, 1898)
- Xanthias joanneae Mendoza, 2013
- Xanthias lamarckii (H. Milne Edwards, 1834)
- Xanthias latifrons (De Man, 1887)
- Xanthias maculatus Sakai, 1961
- Xanthias margaritata Finnegan, 1931
- Xanthias nitidulus (Dana, 1852)
- Xanthias oahuensis Edmondson, 1951
- Xanthias punctatus (H. Milne Edwards, 1834)
- Xanthias sinensis (A. Milne Edwards, 1867)
- Xanthias teres Davie, 1997
