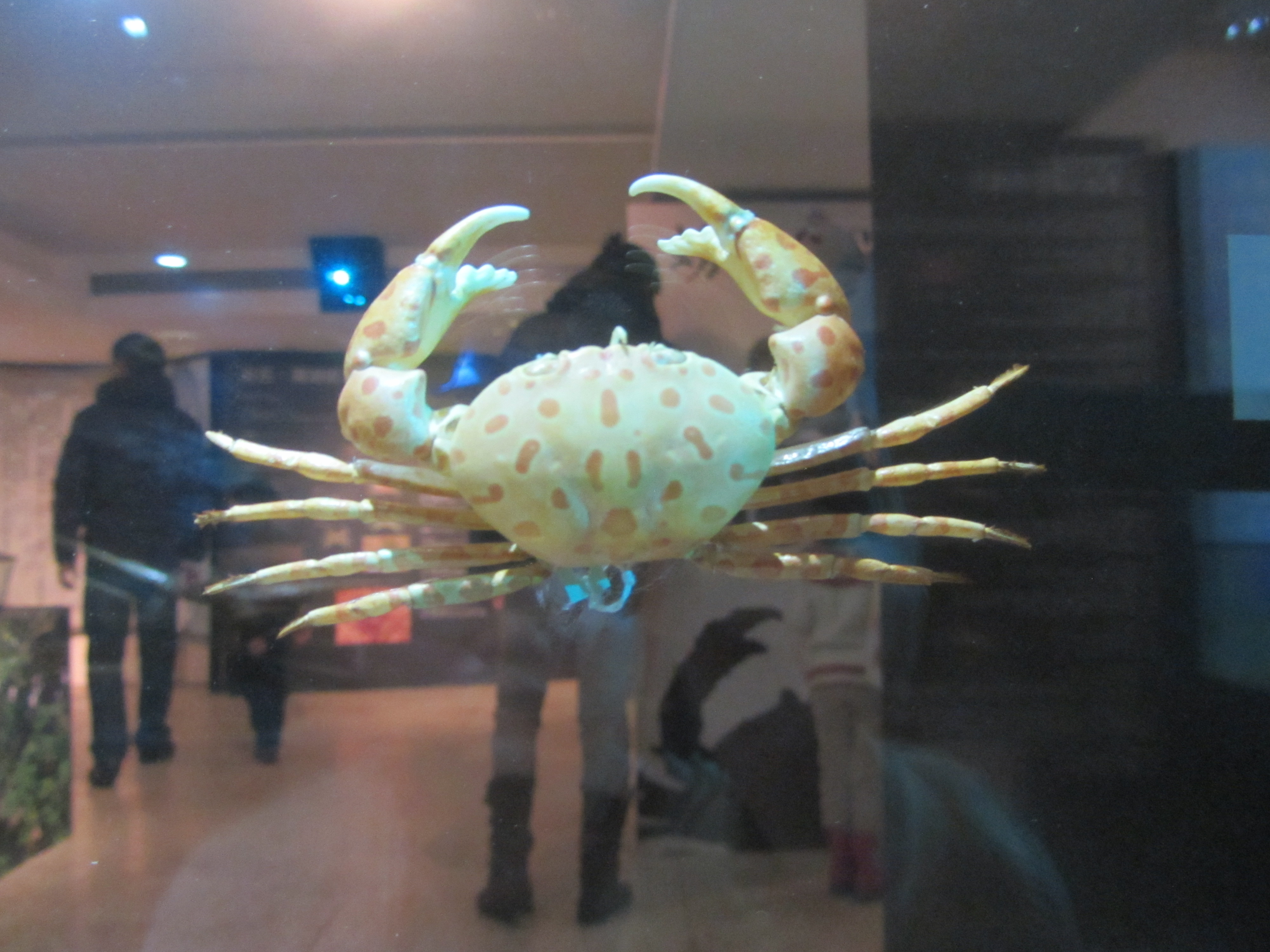
- Liagore rubromaculata

Scientific classification
- Domain: Eukaryota
- Kingdom: Animalia
- Phylum: Arthropoda
- Class: Malacostraca
- Order: Decapoda
- Suborder: Pleocyemata
- Infraorder: Brachyura
- Family: Xanthidae
- Genus: Liagore; De Haan, 1833

= Liagore =

Genus of crabs

Liagore is a genus of crabs in the family Xanthidae, native to Australia, containing the following species:

- Liagore erythematica Guinot, 1971
- Liagore pulchella Ng & Naruse, 2007
- Liagore rubromaculata (De Haan, 1835)
