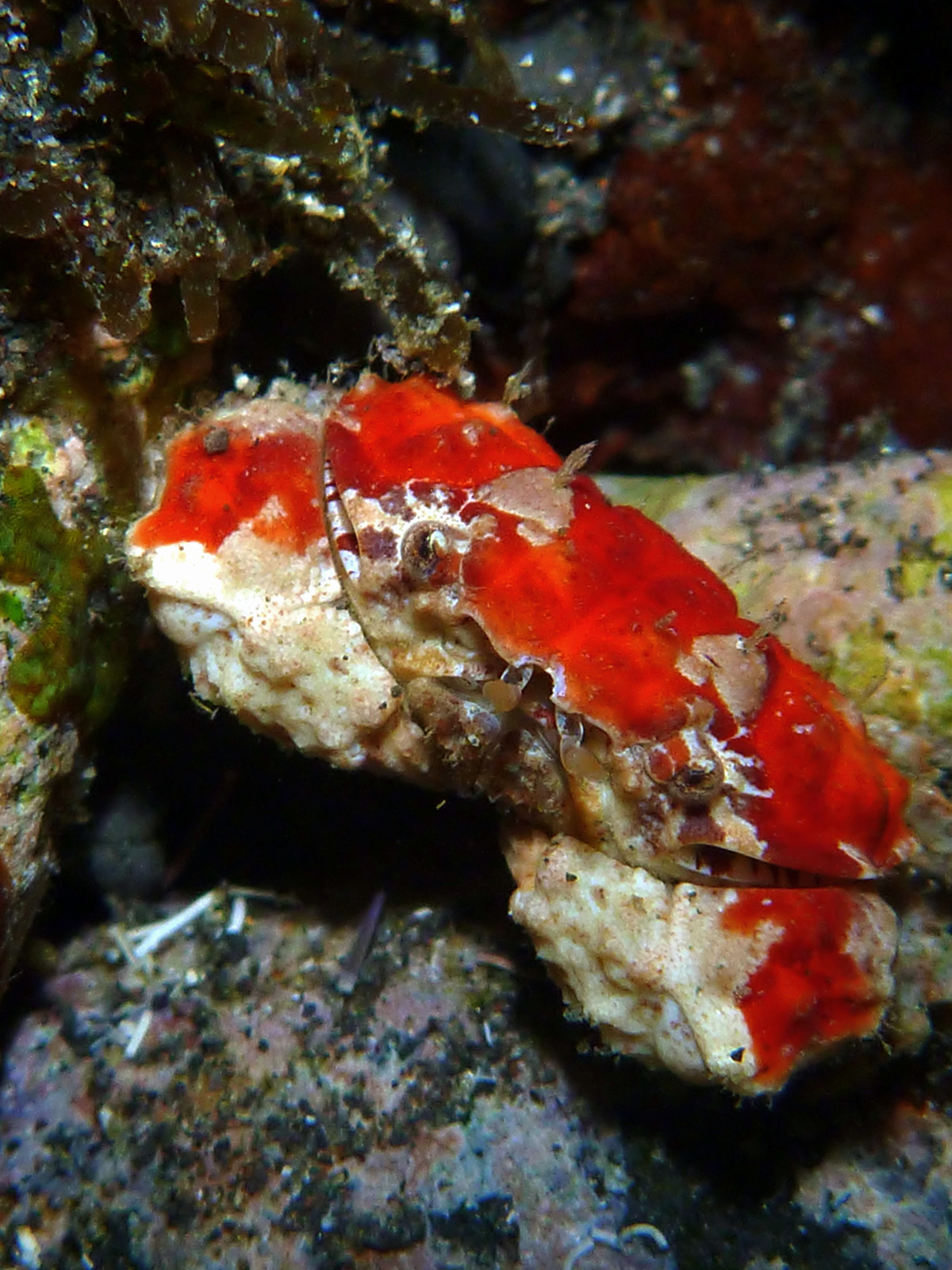
- Hypocolpus stenocoelus

Scientific classification
- Domain: Eukaryota
- Kingdom: Animalia
- Phylum: Arthropoda
- Class: Malacostraca
- Order: Decapoda
- Suborder: Pleocyemata
- Infraorder: Brachyura
- Family: Xanthidae
- Subfamily: Euxanthinae
- Genus: Hypocolpus; Rathbun, 1897

= Hypocolpus =

Genus of crustaceans

Hypocolpus is a genus of crabs in the family Xanthidae, containing the following species:

- Hypocolpus abbotti (Rathbun, 1894)
- Hypocolpus diverticulatus (Strahl, 1861)
- Hypocolpus guinotae Vannini, 1982
- Hypocolpus haanii Rathbun, 1909
- Hypocolpus kurodai Takeda, 1980
- Hypocolpus maculatus (Haswell, 1882)
- Hypocolpus mararae Crosnier, 1991
- Hypocolpus pararugosus Crosnier, 1997
- Hypocolpus pardii Galil & Vannini, 1990
- Hypocolpus perfectus Guinot-Dumortier, 1960
- Hypocolpus rugosus (Henderson, 1893)
- Hypocolpus stenocoelus Guinot-Dumortier, 1960
