= Serenius =

Scientific classification
- Domain: Eukaryota
- Kingdom: Animalia
- Phylum: Arthropoda
- Class: Malacostraca
- Order: Decapoda
- Suborder: Pleocyemata
- Infraorder: Brachyura
- Family: Xanthidae
- Subfamily: Actaeinae
- Genus: Serenius; Guinot, 1976

Genus of crabs

Serenius is a genus of crabs in the family Xanthidae, containing the following species:

- Serenius andamanicus Deb, 1985
- Serenius ceylonicus (Laurie, 1906)
- Serenius demani (Odhner, 1925)
- Serenius gemmula (Dana, 1852)
- Serenius kuekenthali (De Man, 1902)
- Serenius pilosus (A. Milne Edwards, 1867)
