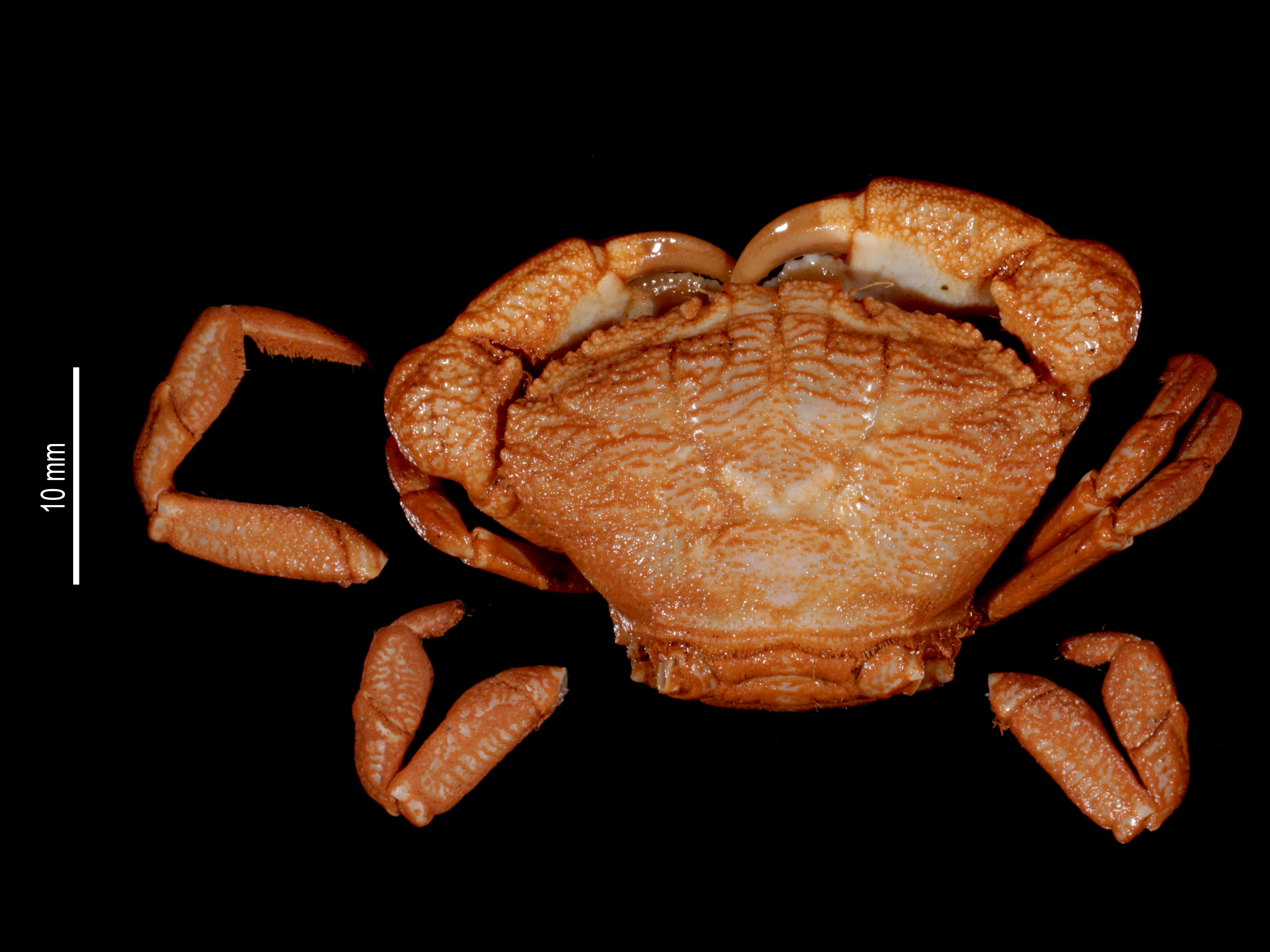
- Medaeops edwardsi

Scientific classification
- Domain: Eukaryota
- Kingdom: Animalia
- Phylum: Arthropoda
- Class: Malacostraca
- Order: Decapoda
- Suborder: Pleocyemata
- Infraorder: Brachyura
- Family: Xanthidae
- Genus: Medaeops; Guinot, 1967

= Medaeops =

Genus of crabs

Medaeops is a genus of crabs in the family Xanthidae, containing the following species:

- Medaeops edwardsi Guinot, 1967
- Medaeops gemini Davie, 1997
- Medaeops granulosus (Haswell, 1882)
- Medaeops japonicus (Rathbun, 1898)
- †Medaeops megamiensis Karasawa, 1993
- Medaeops merodontos Davie, 1997
- Medaeops neglectus (Balss, 1922)
- Medaeops potens Mendoza, Chong & Ng, 2009
- Medaeops serenei Ng & McLay, 2007
