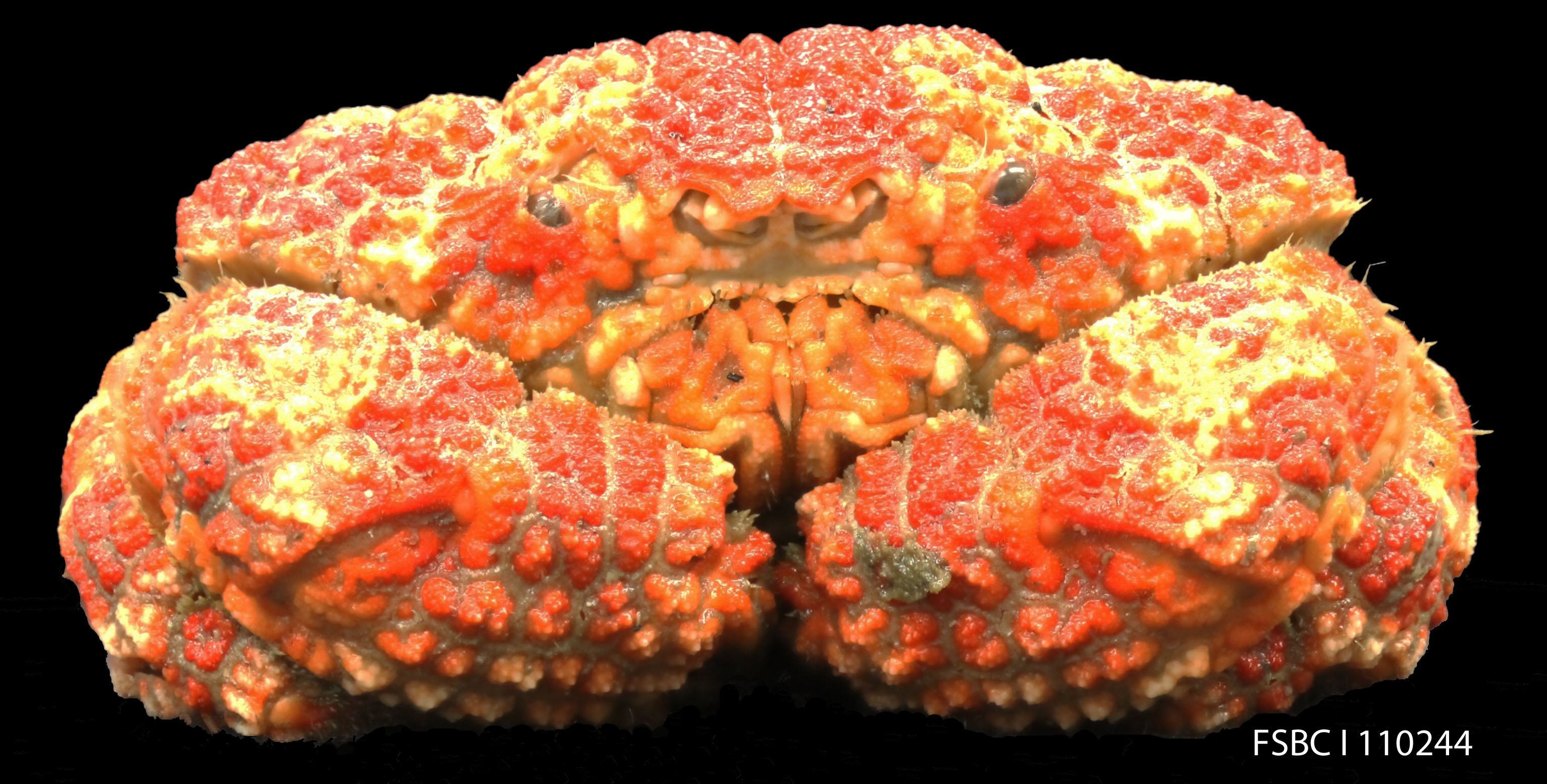
- Glyptoxanthus erosus

Scientific classification
- Domain: Eukaryota
- Kingdom: Animalia
- Phylum: Arthropoda
- Class: Malacostraca
- Order: Decapoda
- Suborder: Pleocyemata
- Infraorder: Brachyura
- Family: Xanthidae
- Subfamily: Glyptoxanthinae; Mendoza & Guinot, 2011
- Genus: Glyptoxanthus; A. Milne-Edwards, 1879

Type species
- Actaea erosa Stimpson, 1859

= Glyptoxanthus =

Genus of crabs

Glyptoxanthus is a genus of crabs in the family Xanthidae, containing eight species. It was originally erected by Alphonse Milne-Edwards in 1879 for six species previously placed in the genus Actaea and elsewhere. Although previously included in subfamily Euxanthinae, the genus has a quite distinct morphology from other genera in that group, and was placed in 2011 in the new, monotypic subfamily, Glyptoxanthinae by Jose Christopher Mendoza and Danièle Guinot.

== Species ==
- Glyptoxanthus angolensis (Brito Capello, 1866)
- Glyptoxanthus cavernosus (A. Milne-Edwards, 1878)
- Glyptoxanthus corrosus (A. Milne-Edwards, 1869)
- Glyptoxanthus erosus (Stimpson, 1859)
- Glyptoxanthus hancocki Garth, 1939
- Glyptoxanthus labyrinthicus (Stimpson, 1860)
- Glyptoxanthus meandricus (Klunzinger, 1913)
- Glyptoxanthus vermiculatus (Lamarck, 1818)
