= Gaillardiellus =

- Gaillardiellus rueppelli

Scientific classification
- Kingdom: Animalia
- Phylum: Arthropoda
- Clade: Pancrustacea
- Class: Malacostraca
- Order: Decapoda
- Suborder: Pleocyemata
- Infraorder: Brachyura
- Family: Xanthidae
- Subfamily: Actaeinae
- Genus: Gaillardiellus; Guinot, 1976

Genus of crabs

Gaillardiellus is a genus of crabs in the family Xanthidae, containing the following species:

- Gaillardiellus alphonsi (Nobili, 1905)
- Gaillardiellus bathus Davie, 1997
- Gaillardiellus holthuisi Takeda & Komatsu, 2010
- Gaillardiellus orientalis (Odhner, 1925)
- Gaillardiellus rueppelli (Krauss, 1843)
- Gaillardiellus superciliaris (Odhner, 1925)
