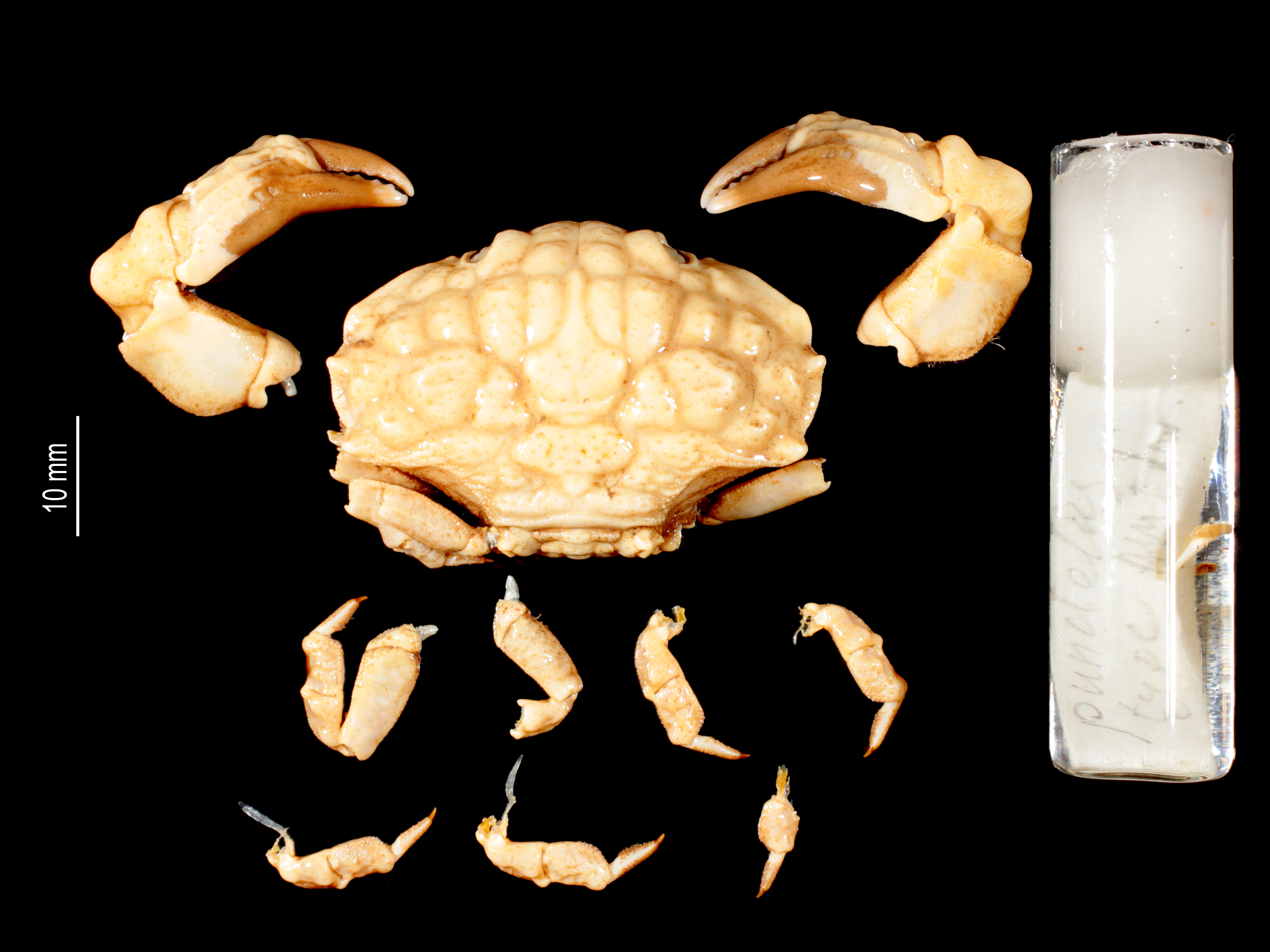
- Euxanthus exsculptus

Scientific classification
- Domain: Eukaryota
- Kingdom: Animalia
- Phylum: Arthropoda
- Class: Malacostraca
- Order: Decapoda
- Suborder: Pleocyemata
- Infraorder: Brachyura
- Family: Xanthidae
- Subfamily: Euxanthinae
- Genus: Euxanthus; Dana, 1851

= Euxanthus =

Genus of crabs

Euxanthus is a genus of crabs in the family Xanthidae containing the following species:

- Euxanthus boletarius (Rathbun, 1911)
- Euxanthus exsculptus (Herbst, 1790)
- Euxanthus herdmani Laurie, 1906
- Euxanthus huonii (Hombron & Jacquinot, 1846)
- Euxanthus ruali Guinot, 1971
- Euxanthus rugosus Miers, 1884
