= Actaeopsis =

Actaeopsis Temporal range: Lower Cretaceous

Scientific classification
- Kingdom: Animalia
- Phylum: Arthropoda
- Class: Malacostraca
- Order: Decapoda
- Suborder: Pleocyemata
- Infraorder: Brachyura
- Subsection: Heterotremata
- Superfamily: Xanthoidea
- Family: incertae sedis
- Genus: Actaeopsis
- Species: A. whiltshirei

Binomial name
- Actaeopsis whiltshirei Carter, 1898

Extinct genus of crabs

Actaeopsis is an extinct genus of crab, containing the single species Actaeopsis whiltshirei from the Lower Cretaceous.
