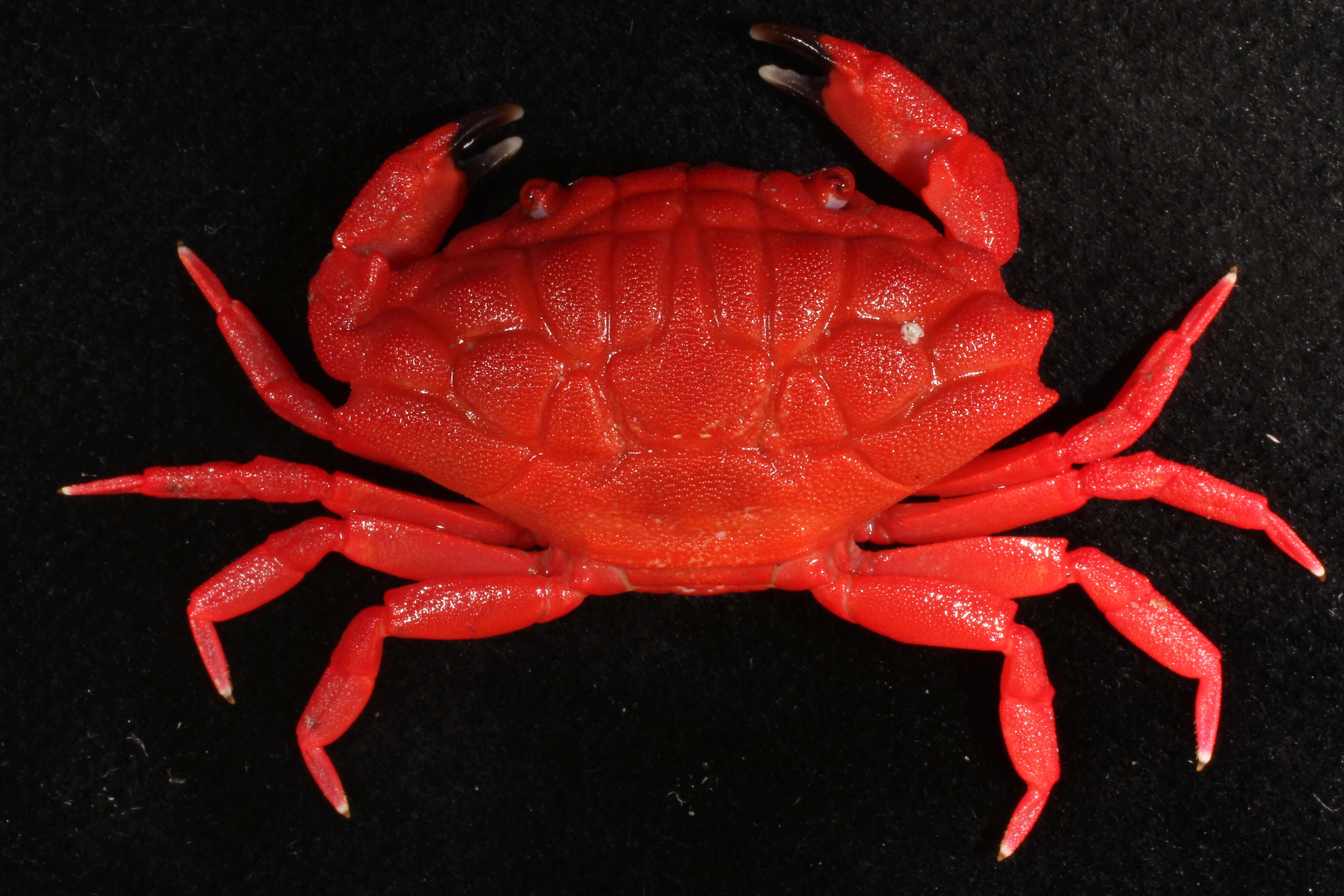
- Liomera rubra

Scientific classification
- Domain: Eukaryota
- Kingdom: Animalia
- Phylum: Arthropoda
- Class: Malacostraca
- Order: Decapoda
- Suborder: Pleocyemata
- Infraorder: Brachyura
- Family: Xanthidae
- Subfamily: Liomerinae
- Genus: Liomera; Dana, 1851

= Liomera =

Genus of crabs

Liomera is a genus of crabs in the family Xanthidae. It contains the following species:

- Liomera albolineata (Serène & Nguyen, 1960)
- †Liomera bagaglioi De Angeli, Garassino & Pasini, 2011
- Liomera bella (Dana, 1852)
- Liomera caelata (Odhner, 1925)
- Liomera canaliculatus (Hombron & Jacquinot, 1846)
- Liomera cinctimana (White, 1847)
- Liomera crucifera (Serène & Nguyen, 1960)
- Liomera edwardsi Kossmann, 1877
- Liomera guttata De Man, 1888
- Liomera hartmeyeri (Odhner, 1925)
- Liomera laperousei Garth, 1985
- Liomera loevis (A. Milne-Edwards, 1873)
- Liomera margaritata (A. Milne-Edwards, 1873)
- Liomera medipacifica (Edmondson, 1951)
- Liomera monticulosa (A. Milne-Edwards, 1873)
- Liomera nigrimanus Davie, 1997
- Liomera nigropunctata (Serène & Nguyen, 1960)
- Liomera pallida (Borradaile, 1900)
- Liomera rubra (A. Milne-Edwards, 1865)
- Liomera rugata (H. Milne-Edwards, 1834)
- Liomera rugipes (Heller, 1861)
- Liomera sagamiensis (Sakai, 1939)
- Liomera schubarti Fahimi & Naderloo, 2024
- Liomera semigranosa De Man, 1888
- Liomera serratipes (Odhner, 1925)
- Liomera stimpsonii (A. Milne-Edwards, 1865)
- Liomera striolata (Odhner, 1925)
- †Liomera sublensis (Rathbun, 1945)
- Liomera supernodosa (Rathbun, 1906)
- †Liomera transversa (Hu, 1983)
- Liomera tristis (Dana, 1852)
- Liomera venosa (H. Milne-Edwards, 1834)
- Liomera virgata (Rathbun, 1906)
- Liomera yaldwyni Takeda & Webber, 2006
