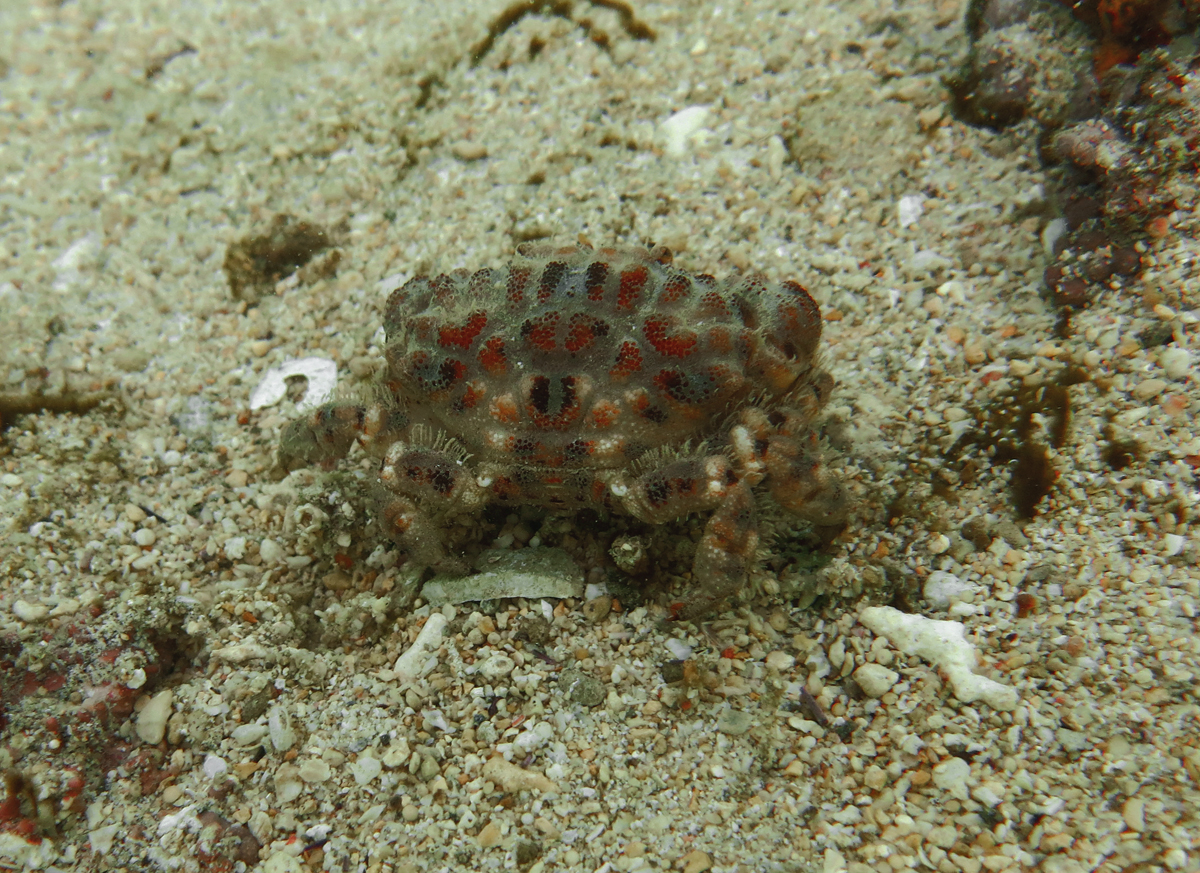
- Paractaea rufopunctata

Scientific classification
- Domain: Eukaryota
- Kingdom: Animalia
- Phylum: Arthropoda
- Class: Malacostraca
- Order: Decapoda
- Suborder: Pleocyemata
- Infraorder: Brachyura
- Family: Xanthidae
- Subfamily: Actaeinae
- Genus: Paractaea; Guinot, 1969

= Paractaea =

Genus of crabs

Paractaea is a genus of crabs in the family Xanthidae, containing the following species:

- Paractaea excentrica Guinot, 1969
- Paractaea garretti (Rathbun, 1906)
- Paractaea indica Deb, 1985
- Paractaea margaritaria (A. Milne-Edwards, 1868)
- Paractaea monodi Guinot, 1969
- Paractaea nodosa (Stimpson, 1860)
- Paractaea philippinensis (Ward, 1942)
- Paractaea rebieri Guinot, 1969
- Paractaea retusa (Nobili, 1905)
- Paractaea rufopunctata (H. Milne-Edwards, 1834)
- Paractaea secundarathbunae Guinot, 1969
- Paractaea sulcata (Stimpson, 1860)
- Paractaea tumulosa (Odhner, 1925)
- Paractaea typica Deb, 1989
