= A. alexandri =

A. alexandri may refer to:

- Acacia alexandri, a species of flowering plant
- Acanthocarpus alexandrii, a species of crab in the genus Acanthocarpus
- Acantholimon alexandri, a species of flowering plant in the genus Acantholimon
- Agaricochirus alexandri, a species of crab in the family Paguridae
- Agrilus alexandri, a species of jewel beetle in the genus Agrilus
- Alchemilla alexandri, a species of flowering plant in the genus Alchemilla
- Aleiodes alexandri, a species of wasp in the genus Aleiodes
- Amanita alexandri, a species of fungus in the genus Amanita
- Amphimallon alexandri, a species of scarab beetle in the genus Amphimallon
- Amynthas alexandri, a species of earthworm in the genus Amynthas
- Anthurium alexandri, a species of flowering plant in the genus Anthurium
- Anisodontea alexandri, a species of flowering plant in the genus Anisodontea
- Aphelandra alexandri, a species of flowering plant in the genus Aphelandra
- Apus alexandri, a species of swift
- Arawella alexandri, a species of copepod in the family Tegastidae
- Archilochus alexandri, a species of hummingbird
- Aspilota alexandri, a species of wasp in the genus Aspilota
- Atanyproctus alexandri, a species of scarab beetle in the genus Atanyproctus
- Austrolebias alexandri, a species of fish in the genus Austrolebias
- Axicrinus alexandri, a species of crinoid in the subclass Articulata
