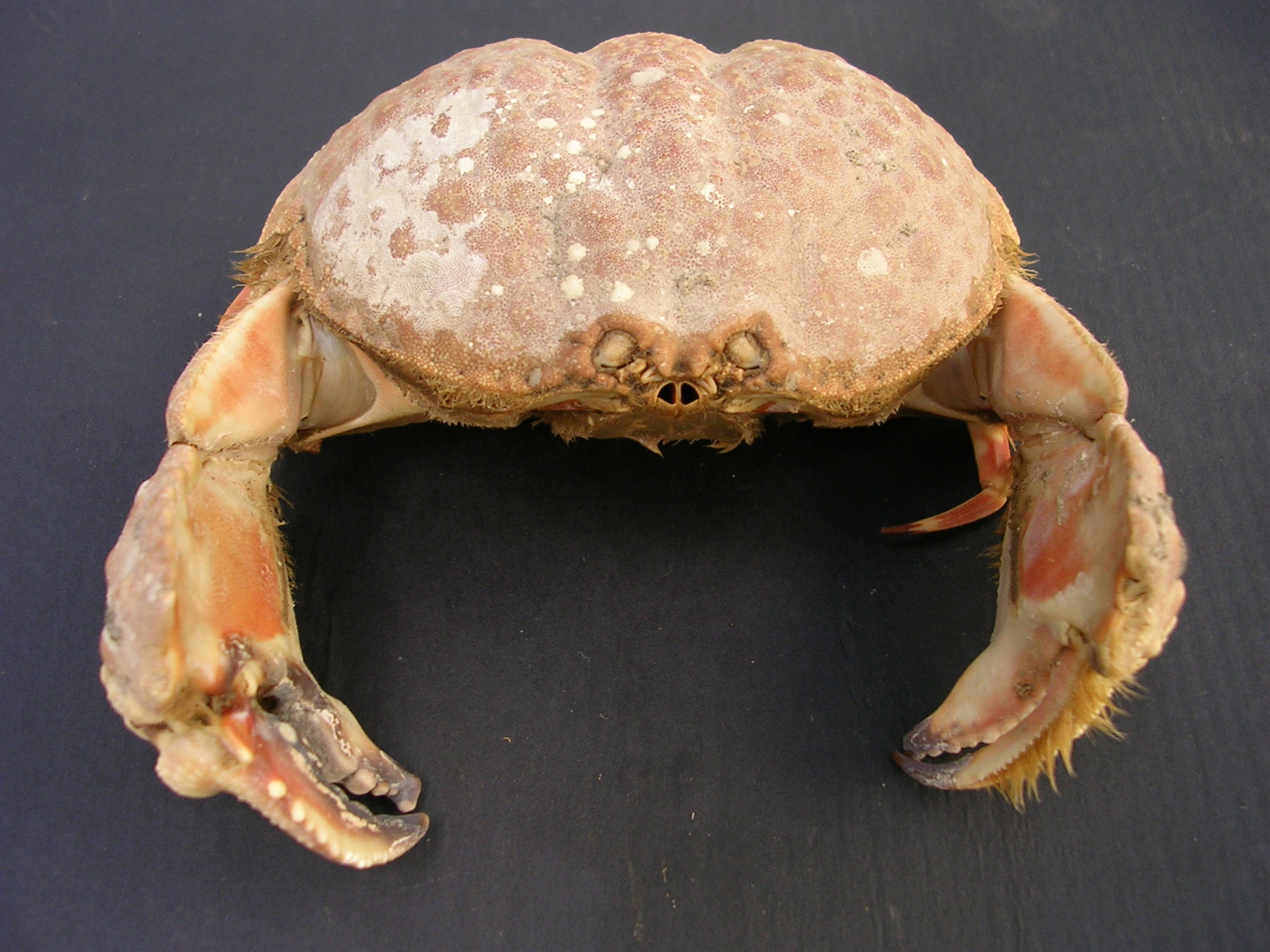

Scientific classification
- Kingdom: Animalia
- Phylum: Arthropoda
- Clade: Pancrustacea
- Class: Malacostraca
- Order: Decapoda
- Suborder: Pleocyemata
- Infraorder: Brachyura
- Family: Calappidae
- Genus: Calappa
- Species: C. gallus

Binomial name
- Calappa gallus (Herbst, 1803)

= Calappa gallus =

Species of crab

Calappa gallus, common name rough box crab, or lumpy box crab, and Hawaiian name poki poki, is a benthic species of box crab in the family Calappidae.
