= Calappa =

Calappa may refer to:

- Calappa (crab), a genus of crabs, referred to as the box crabs
- Calappa, synonym of Cocos; a genus of palms in the family Arecaceae
