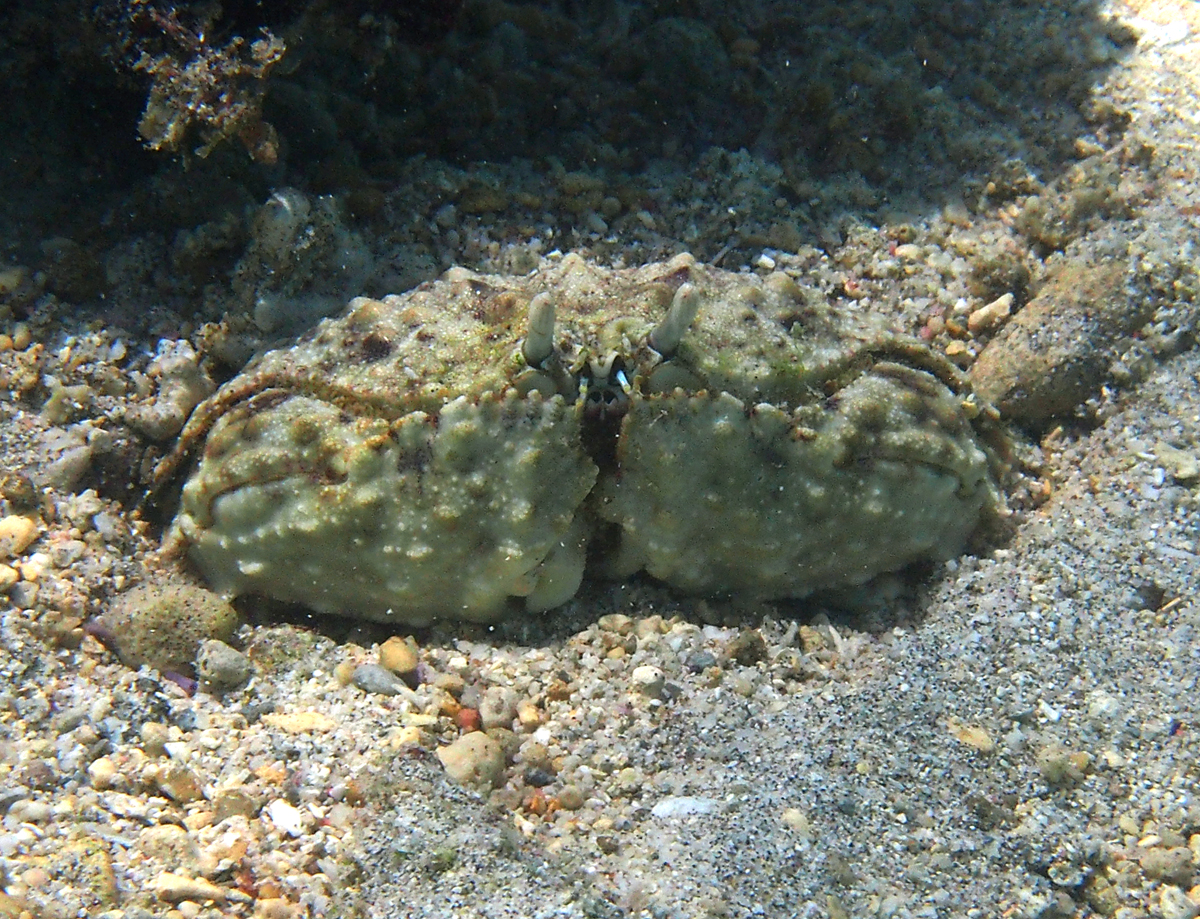

Scientific classification
- Kingdom: Animalia
- Phylum: Arthropoda
- Class: Malacostraca
- Order: Decapoda
- Suborder: Pleocyemata
- Infraorder: Brachyura
- Family: Calappidae
- Genus: Calappa
- Species: C. hepatica

Binomial name
- Calappa hepatica (Linnaeus, 1758)

Synonyms
- Cancer afata Curtiss, 1938; Cancer hepaticus Linnaeus, 1758; Cancer tuberculatus Herbst, 1785; Calappa tuberculosa Guérin, 1829; Calappa spinosissima H. Milne-Edwards, 1837; Calappe sandwichien Eydoux & Souleyet, 1842

= Calappa hepatica =

Species of crustacean

Calappa hepatica, the reef box crab, is a common benthic species of box crab of tropical and subtropical parts of the Indian and Pacific Oceans and the Red Sea.

== Description ==
Calappa hepatica grows to a carapace width of about 4 cm (1.6 in); the length is always less than two thirds of its width. The posterior portion of the shell has broad extensions with several blunt teeth on the margin, and these largely conceal the walking legs. The carapace and the exposed parts of the chelae (pincers) are a mottled greyish-brown colour, and are covered with small raised tubercles of various sizes, making the crabs well-camouflaged when semi-submerged in the sand. The chelae are large and powerful, and specially adapted to the crab's feeding behaviour, the crushing and eating of molluscs.

== Distribution and habitat ==
Calappa hepatica is found in the tropical and subtropical Indo-Pacific region, its range extending from the Red Sea to Hawaii, French Polynesia, Cocos Island and northern Australia. Its typical habitat is on the sandy or shelly sand seabed, often in reef habitats, and seagrass meadows, at depths down to about 150 m (500 ft).

== Ecology ==
During the day, Calappa hepatica remains buried in sand with only the area round the eyes protruding. It emerges at night to hunt for prey, and can rebury itself in the substrate efficiently and fast if danger threatens. It is a predator, and largely feeds on bivalve and gastropod molluscs, as well as hermit crabs. It has a specially adapted right chela which it uses to break open the shell of its prey; for this purpose it has a large accessory tooth located at the base of the hinged part of the claw, which is located opposite a flat plate on the fixed part, the two working together like a vice. After breaking open the shell, it uses its left pincer, which is longer and more pointed than the right, to pick out the soft tissues.

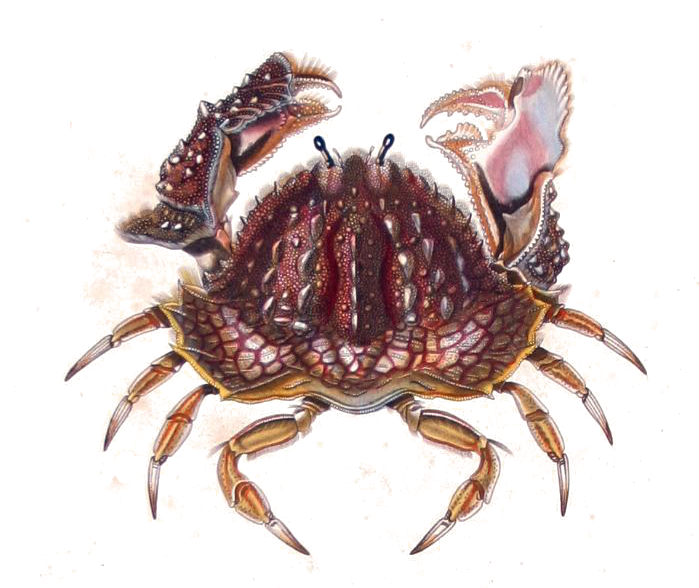
Illustration of Calappa sandwichien made in 1852, a synonym of C. hepatica

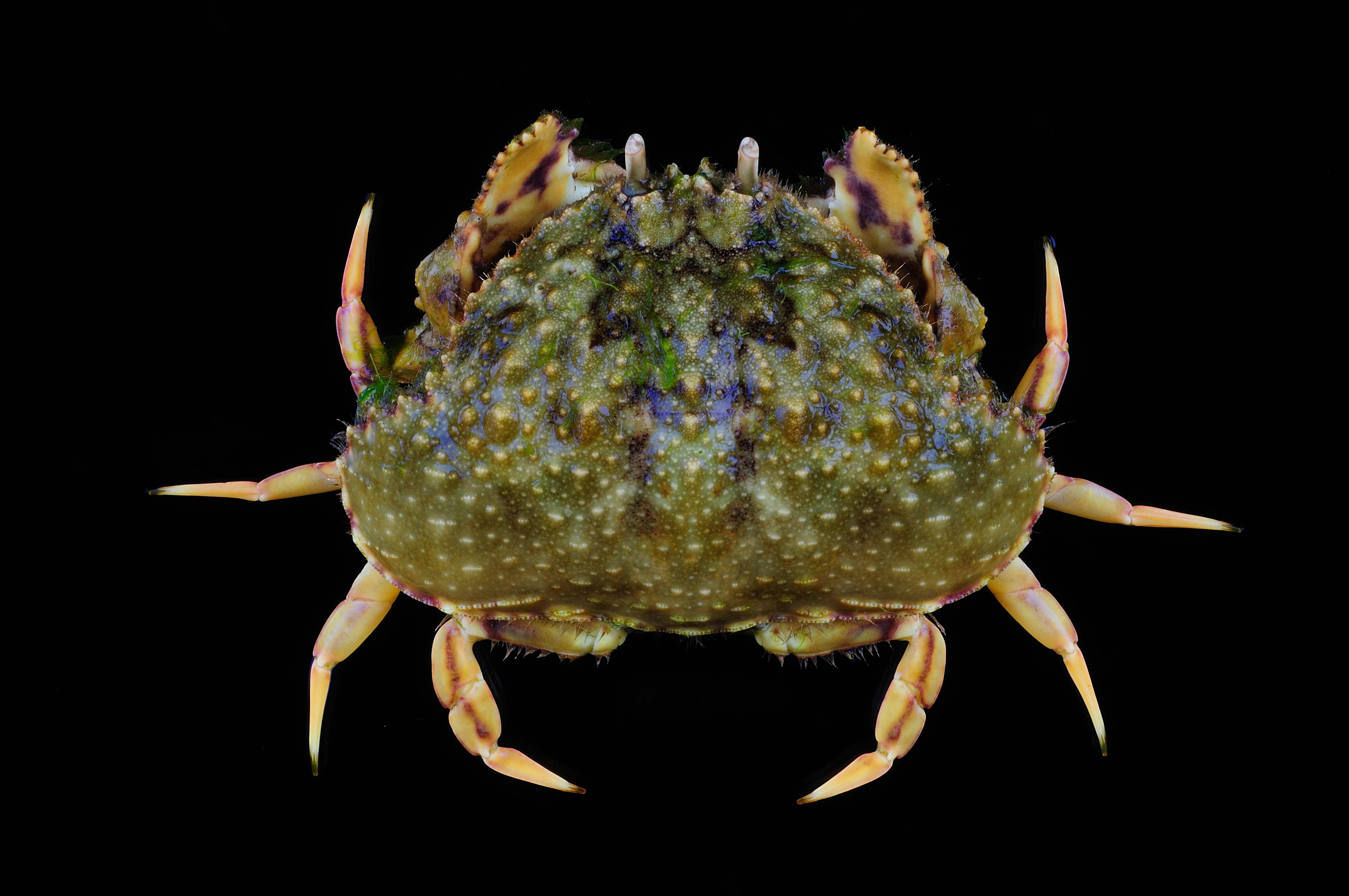
Preserved specimen

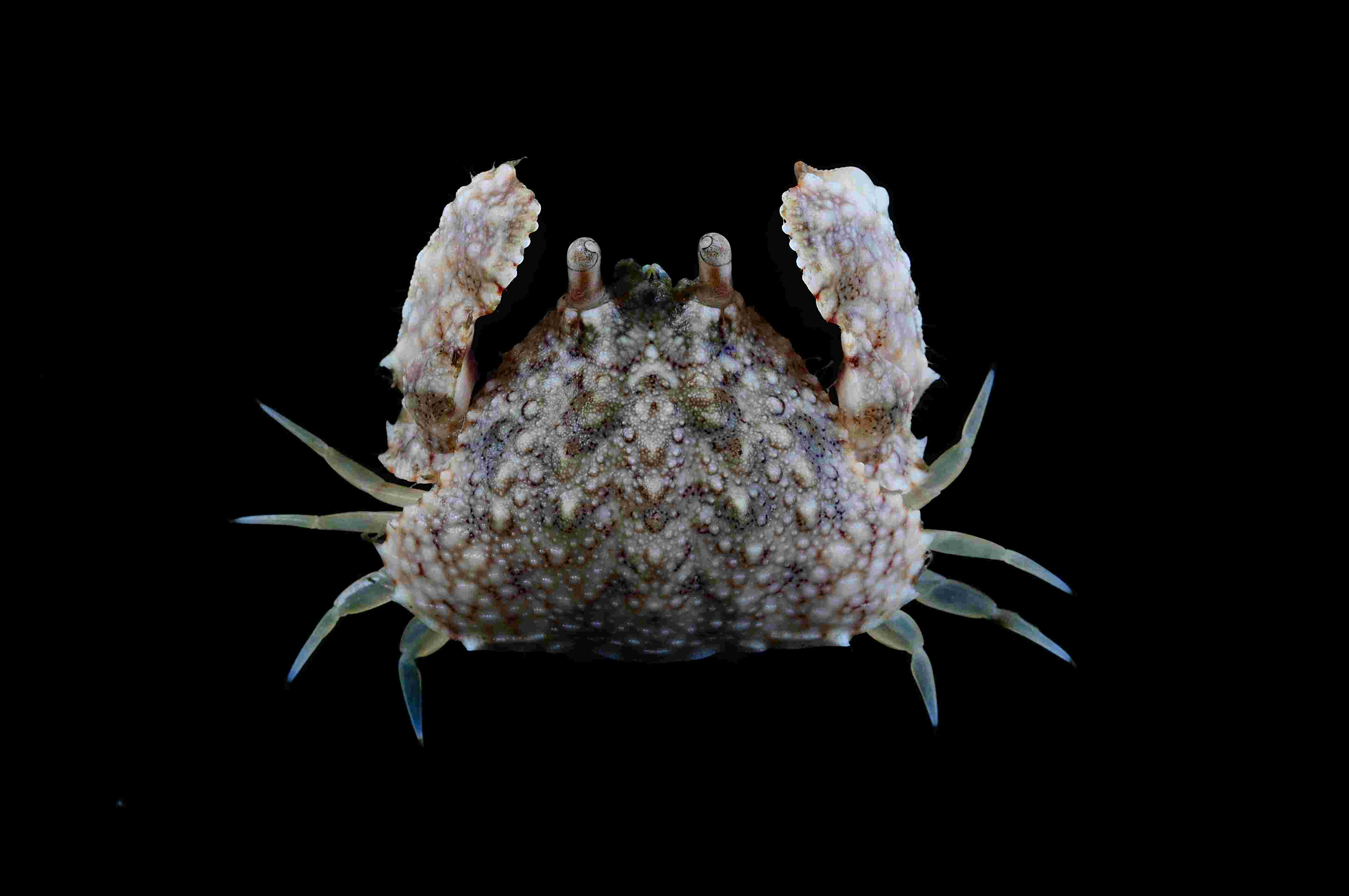
Both of these specimens belong to the collection of the Museé National D'Histoire Naturelle (MNHN)
