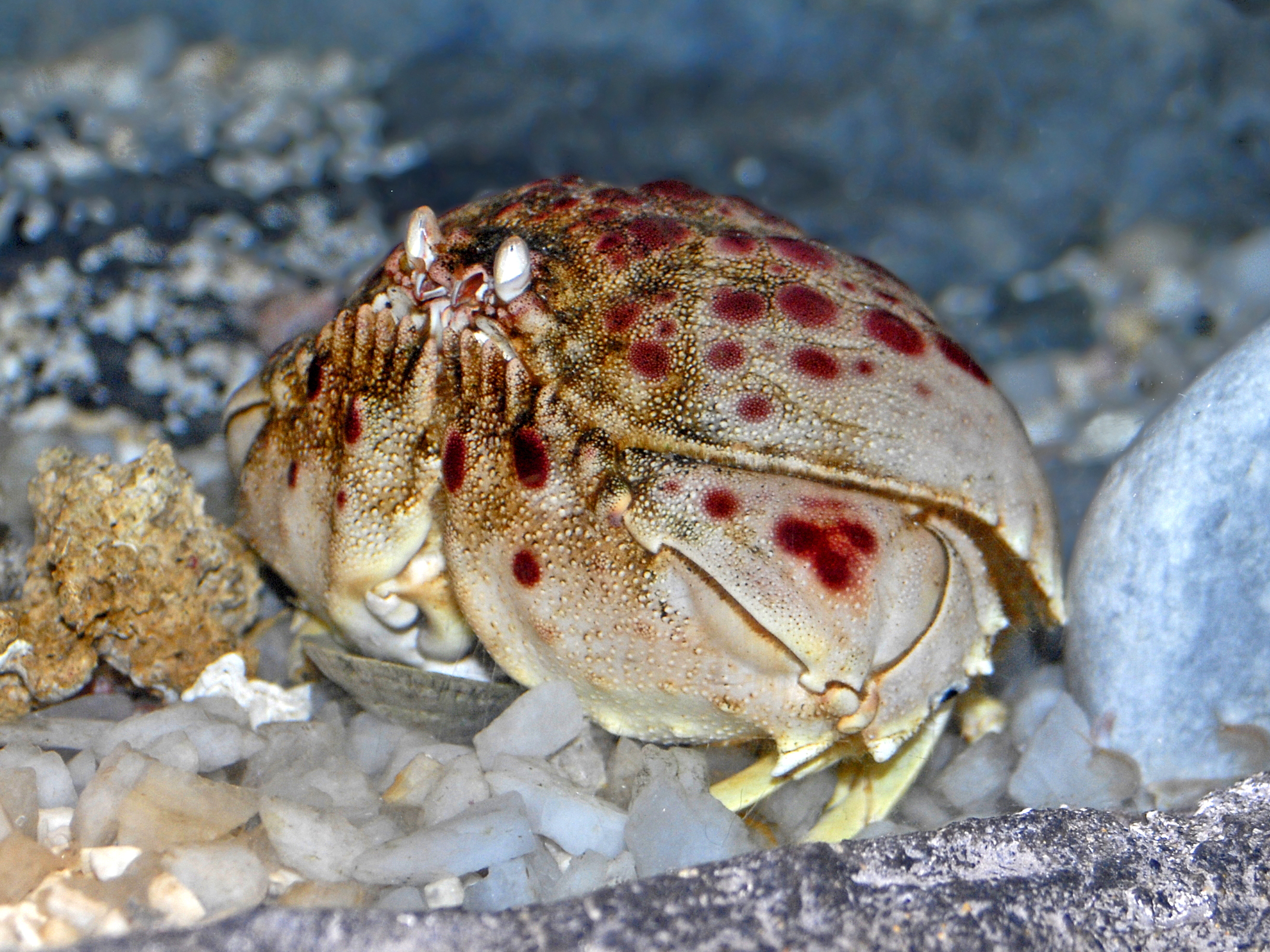

Scientific classification
- Kingdom: Animalia
- Phylum: Arthropoda
- Class: Malacostraca
- Order: Decapoda
- Suborder: Pleocyemata
- Infraorder: Brachyura
- Family: Calappidae
- Genus: Calappa
- Species: C. calappa

Binomial name
- Calappa calappa (Linnaeus, 1758)

= Calappa calappa =

Species of crab

Calappa calappa, also known as the smooth box crab or red-spotted box crab, is a tropical marine species of crab with an Indo-Pacific distribution, and showing great variability in its patterning and colouration. First described as Cancer calappa by Linnaeus in 1758 from a specimen originating from Ambon Island, and later in 1781 as Cancer fornicatus by Fabricius, it was finally placed in the genus Calappa by Lancelot Alexander Borradaile in 1903. The name calappa is associated with kelapa, the Malay word for 'coconut'.

== Description ==
Occurring in the intertidal zone to a depth of 50 m, this species has a carapace of about 15 cm, indistinctly rugose on the anterior half, with wavy lines edging the posterior. It is active during the night hours, and is able, when threatened, to swiftly burrow beneath the sand. It feeds mainly on mollusks such as clams, steadying them with its legs and then, using its pincers, either prising the valves apart or breaking them.

The carapace of this species curves downwards to protect its legs, this in combination with their large front claws allows this species to protect its vulnerable appendages and the front of their body from predators.

== Distribution ==
This species can be found in Mombasa, Seychelles, Aldabra Island, Madagascar, Mauritius, Andamans, Japan, Taiwan, the Philippines, Palau, Indonesia, Papua New Guinea, Shark Bay, Abrolhos Islands, New Caledonia, Hawaiian Islands, Marquesas, Society Islands.

== Gallery ==
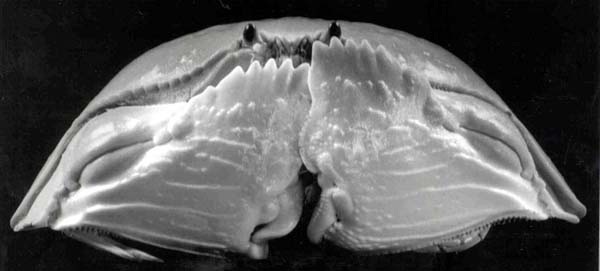
front view

Mottled specimen, view from above

View from above
