= Acanthocarpus =

The genus name Acanthocarpus may refer to:

- Acanthocarpus (plant), a genus of monocots currently placed in the Asparagaceae
- Acanthocarpus (crab), a genus of crabs in the family Calappidae
