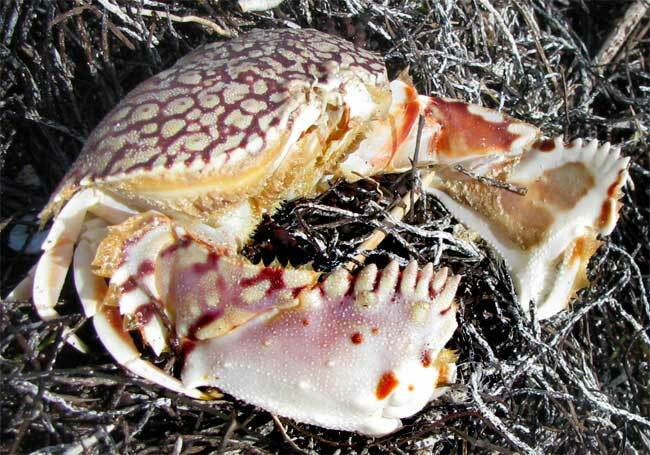
- Calappa flammea at water's edge

Scientific classification
- Kingdom: Animalia
- Phylum: Arthropoda
- Clade: Pancrustacea
- Class: Malacostraca
- Order: Decapoda
- Suborder: Pleocyemata
- Infraorder: Brachyura
- Family: Calappidae
- Genus: Calappa
- Species: C. flammea

Binomial name
- Calappa flammea (Herbst, 1794)

Synonyms
- Cancer flammeus Herbst; Calappa moniziana de Brito Capello

= Calappa flammea =

Species of crab

Calappa flammea, the flame box crab, is a species of crab native to the western Atlantic Ocean. It is a member of the box crab family, the Calappidae.

== Description ==
Sometimes species of the genus Calappa are known by the name of "shame-faced crabs" because the big, colorful, boxy species often are seen with their large claws, or chelae, folded across the front of their bodies as if hiding the face. Beyond that, here are other key features helping to recognize the flame box crab:

- The general color is grayish with purplish-brown markings on top, and banding on the legs.
- On the head area, the sockets containing the eyes, the "orbits," are not separated from the cavities on the underside of the head where the first pair of antennae are attached, the "antennular sockets."
- The carapace with its rounded front, almost straight behind, and with a granular surface, is wider than long, and up to 15 cm (6 in) wide. At both ends of the back margin there is no spine. The hind margins form a thin roof over the legs, partially covering them. On the carapace, the central-middle area and along the sides displays no deep hollow.
- The darker ornamentation of the carapace's front part, not just at midlength, consists of interlacing bands, which on the back part become obliquely arranged stripes which fade somewhat toward the back.
- The large claws, or chelae, are dissimilar, flattened, triangular, with a crest above, and with fingers strongly bent downwards. On the claws' immovable bottom fingers there are pairs of protuberances.
- On the underside of the head, the well-defined, frame-like depression, or "buccal cavity," housing the mouthparts is triangular, not quadrate.

=== Larval stage ===
Here are key features helping to identify larvae of flame box crab:

- The body and legs are sparsely spined or without them though setae are present.
- The carapace is about 5.1 mm (3/16 in) long, longer than wide, smooth and with sparse setae. The back margin is rounded and spineless.
- The forward extension of the carapace in front of the eyes, or rostrum, is flat with no spines on the side and not divided at the tip.
- The abdomen extends backward.
- Antennae have more than 6 segments and bear numerous setae.
- Pereiopods are small in proportion to the chelipeds and carapace size.
- Uropods are absent.

== Distribution ==
Flame box crabs occur in the western Atlantic Ocean. It is found as far north as the Woods Hole region of Massachusetts, USA, and south through the Gulf of Mexico, plus the Bahamas and Bermuda. Older literature may report it as far south as Brazil. However, what earlier was regarded as Brazilian Calappa flammea now is accepted as Calappa ocellata. Apparently the southernmost limit is Suriname and French Guiana on South America's northeast coast.

== Habitat ==
Flame box crabs are marine, occurring in shallow to deep water at depths of 10–190 m (33–623 ft). Around Bermuda typically they occur on sandy or muddy floors near coral reefs, seagrass beds and rocky outcrops, where mainly they are active at night.

== Feeding habits ==
Among other foods, flame box crabs feed on the gastropods known as whelks and cone shells, whose shells spiral in both clockwise and counterclockwise directions; they have right-handed and left-handed shells. Flame box crabs have a special "tool," apparently a spine on the claws, which they use like a can-opener to "peel" their prey and gain access to the flesh otherwise protected by the shell. This tool does not work well on whelks and cone shells with "left-handed shells," so flame box crabs mainly feed on mollusks with right-handed shells.

== As an aquarium species ==
Flame box crab is described as having difficulty in the aquarium, and may not be suitable for aquarium keeping.

== Taxonomy ==
In 1794, when Johann Friedrich Wilhelm Herbst formally described Calappa flammea under the basionym Cancer flammeus, he stated that the new species was from the East Indies: "Das Vaterland ist Ostindien." This was incorrect, his material evidently being wrongly labeled. In 1803 Herbst wrote that also the species occurred in America.

=== Etymology ===
The genus name Calappa derives from the Malay language word Kelappa, meaning "coconut," possibly referring to the boxy shape of the species' bodies.

The species name flammea is from Latin, the feminine, nominative, singular case, meaning "flaming, fiery, fiery red," surely in reference to the species' ornamentation.
