= Aspilota vicina =

Scientific classification
- Domain: Eukaryota
- Kingdom: Animalia
- Phylum: Arthropoda
- Class: Insecta
- Order: Hymenoptera
- Family: Braconidae
- Genus: Aspilota
- Species: A. vicina

Binomial name
- Aspilota vicina Belokobylskij, 2007

Species of wasp

Aspilota vicina is a species of insect from the Braconidae family. The scientific name of this species was first published in 2007 by Belokobylskij. This species is native to the Russian Far East.
