= Paracyclois =

Scientific classification
- Kingdom: Animalia
- Phylum: Arthropoda
- Class: Malacostraca
- Order: Decapoda
- Suborder: Pleocyemata
- Infraorder: Brachyura
- Family: Calappidae
- Genus: Paracyclois; Miers, 1886

Genus of crabs

Paracyclois is a genus of crabs in the family Calappidae, containing the following species:

- Paracyclois atlantis Chace, 1939
- Paracyclois milneedwardsii Miers, 1886
