= Calappula =

Scientific classification
- Kingdom: Animalia
- Phylum: Arthropoda
- Class: Malacostraca
- Order: Decapoda
- Suborder: Pleocyemata
- Infraorder: Brachyura
- Family: Calappidae
- Genus: Calappula; Galil, 1997
- Species: C. saussurei

Binomial name
- Calappula saussurei (Rathbun, 1898)

Genus of crabs

Calappula saussurei is a species of crab in the family Calappidae, the only species in the genus Calappula.
