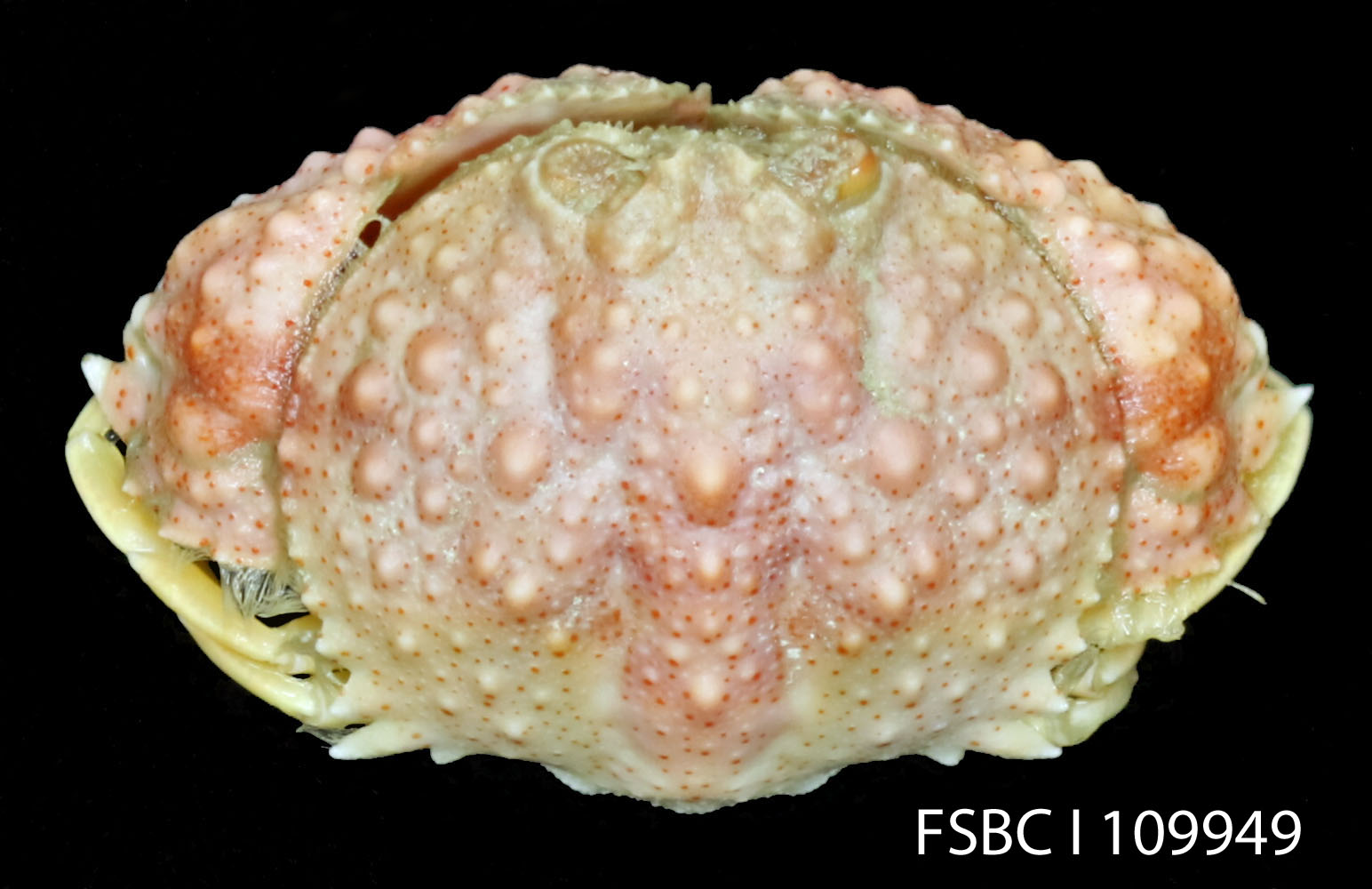

Scientific classification
- Kingdom: Animalia
- Phylum: Arthropoda
- Class: Malacostraca
- Order: Decapoda
- Suborder: Pleocyemata
- Infraorder: Brachyura
- Family: Calappidae
- Genus: Cyclozodion; Williams & Child, 1989

Type species
- Cyclozodion angustum (A. Milne-Edwards, 1880)

= Cyclozodion =

Genus of crabs

Cyclozodion is a genus of crabs in the family Calappidae, containing the following species:

- Cyclozodion angustum (A. Milne-Edwards, 1880)
- Cyclozodion tuberatum Williams & Child, 1989
