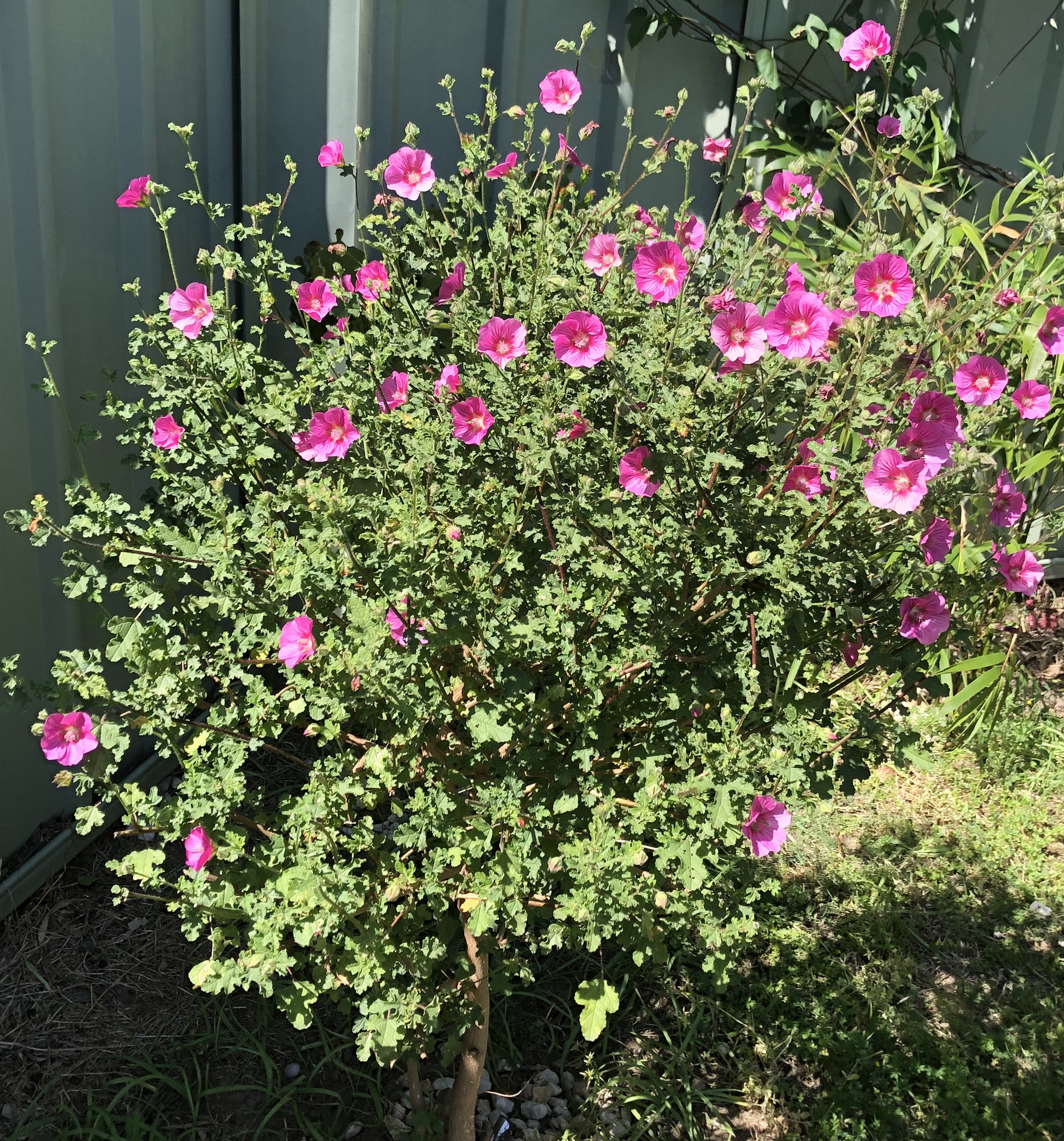

Scientific classification
- Kingdom: Plantae
- Clade: Tracheophytes
- Clade: Angiosperms
- Clade: Eudicots
- Clade: Rosids
- Order: Malvales
- Family: Malvaceae
- Genus: Anisodontea
- Species: A. capensis

Binomial name
- Anisodontea capensis (L.) D.M.Bates

Synonyms
- List: Althaea africana (Mill.) Borbás; Malva balsamica Jacq.; Malva capensis L.; Malva debilis Salisb.; Malva dilleniana Eckl. & Zeyh.; Malva divaricata Andrews; Malva microphylla E.Mey. ex Harv.; Malva odorata Westc.; Malva oxyacanthoides Eckl. & Zeyh. ex Harv.; Malva virgata Cav.; Malva virgata Murray; Malva viscosa Salisb.; Malvastrum capense (L.) Garcke; Malvastrum divaricatum (Andrews) Garcke; Malvastrum virgatum A.Gray & Harv.; Malveopsis capensis (L.) Kuntze; Malveopsis divaricata (Andrews) Kuntze; Malveopsis virgata (A.Gray & Harv.) Kuntze

= Anisodontea capensis =

Species of flowering plant

Anisodontea capensis, known as African mallow, dwarf hibiscus, Cape mallow and false mallow, is a species in the tribe Malveae in the family Malvaceae that is native to the Cape Provinces of South Africa. It has gained the Royal Horticultural Society's Award of Garden Merit as an ornamental.

== Description ==
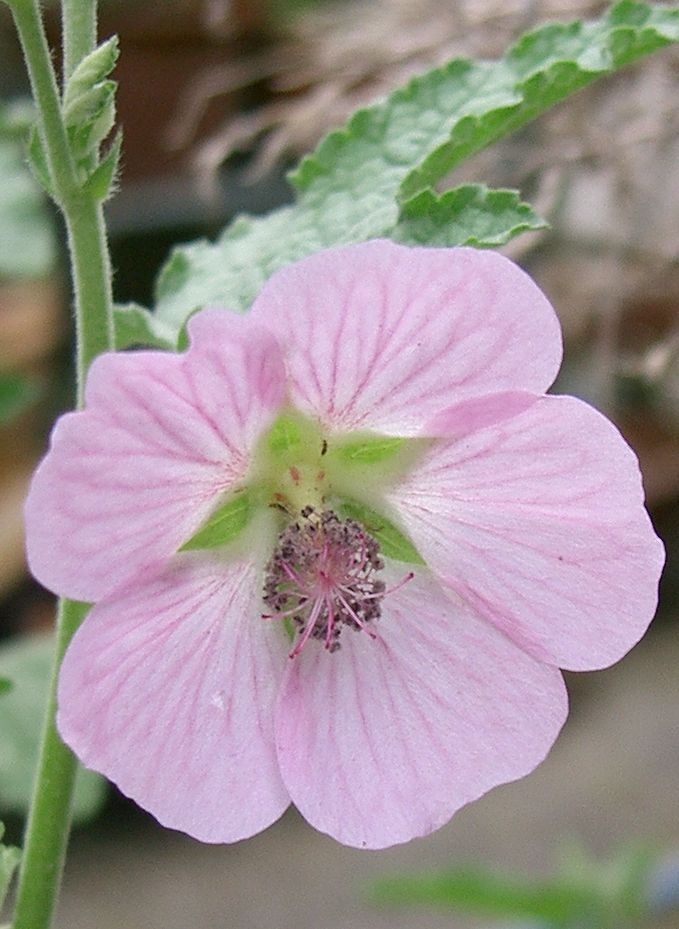
Flower close-up

It is an upright, dense subshrub that grows 1m to 1.5m tall and 90cm wide, and is found at altitudes of 670 to 2167 meters. It features green, hairy branches 2mm in length that age to brownish grey. Leaves are simple and ovate, palmately veined and three-lobed, 1mm in length. It has a woody base, so it is not a true herbaceous plant. During a cold spell, it may lose some of its leaves.

From late winter or early spring to the first frost, it would display fuchsia, mauve or pink flowers with red centres that are borne in clusters with 5 petals, 1mm in diameter, resembling a hibiscus.

== Cultivation ==
The plant does well in Mediterranean style gardens, in containers and as a hedge. They thrive in well-drained soils with organic matter and must be watered regularly during hot and dry spells. Some light pruning is encouraged to promote bushy and compact growth.

It can be propagated from tip cuttings done in the summer, and as well by seed (which should be sown on the surface). It can bloom all year long provided it is protected from frost.
