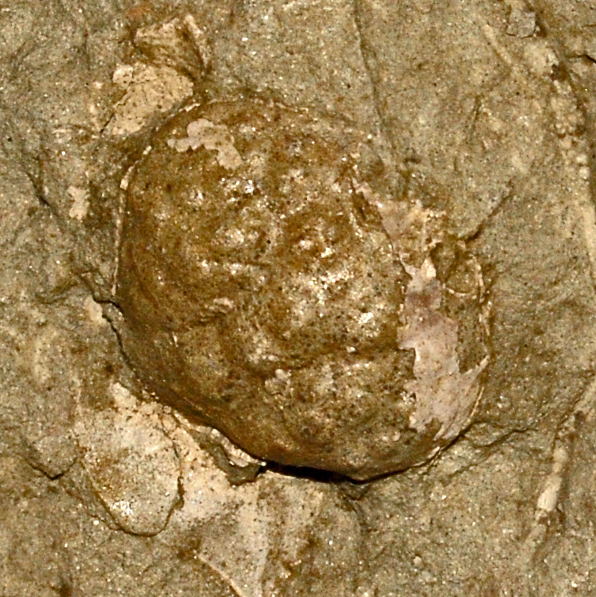
- Fossil of Mursiopsis pustulosus

Scientific classification
- Kingdom: Animalia
- Phylum: Arthropoda
- Class: Malacostraca
- Order: Decapoda
- Suborder: Pleocyemata
- Infraorder: Brachyura
- Family: Calappidae
- Genus: Mursiopsis; Ristori, 1889

= Mursiopsis =

Mursiopsis Temporal range: Oligocene

Extinct genus of crabs

Mursiopsis is an extinct genus of box crabs belonging to the family Calappidae. The type species of the genus is Mursiopsis pustulosus, Ristori 1889.

Fossils of crabs within this genus can be found in sediment of Oligocene (33.9 to 23.03 million years ago).
