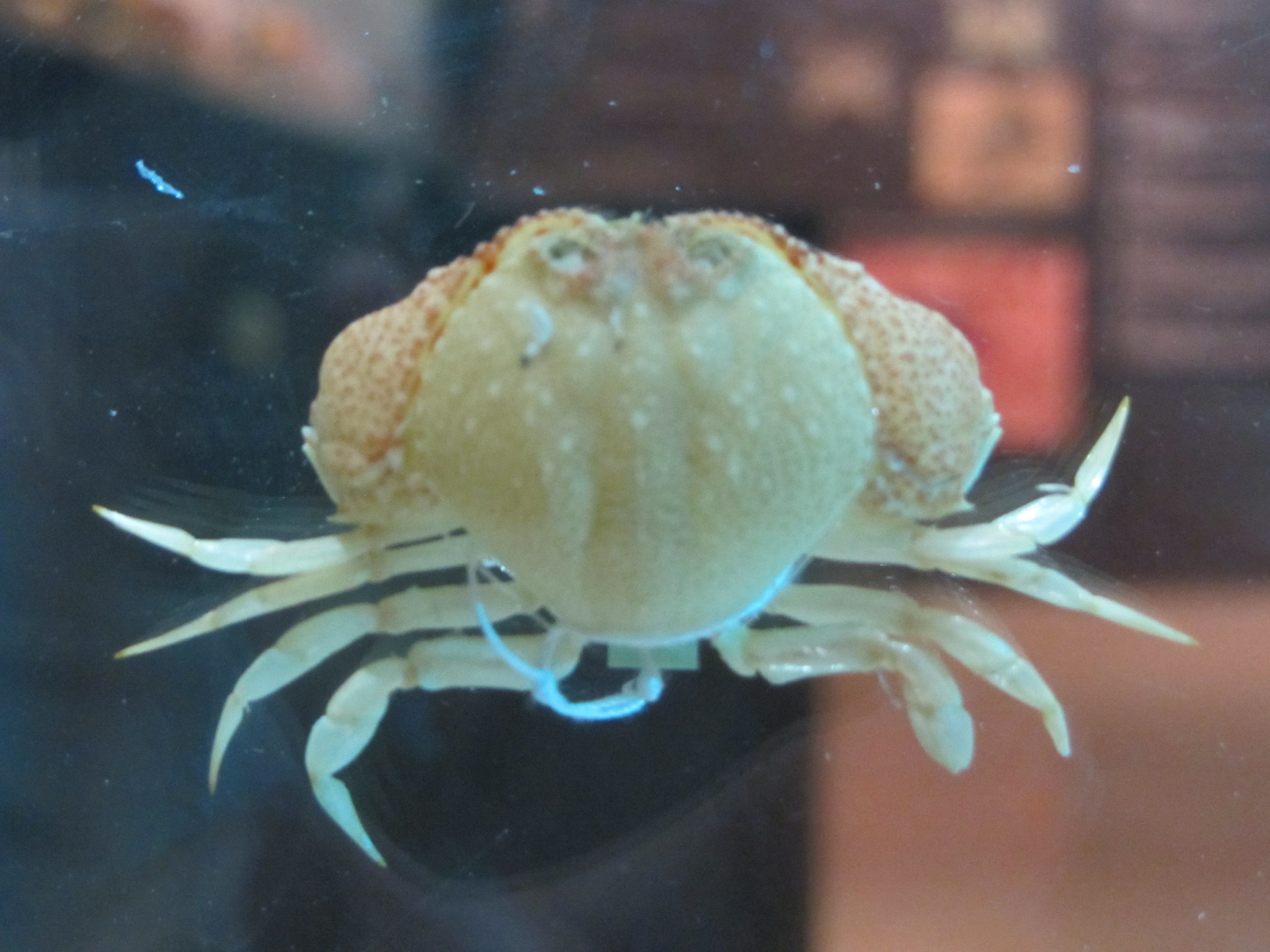
- Specimen of Cycloes granulosa

Scientific classification
- Kingdom: Animalia
- Phylum: Arthropoda
- Class: Malacostraca
- Order: Decapoda
- Suborder: Pleocyemata
- Infraorder: Brachyura
- Family: Calappidae
- Genus: Cycloes; De Haan, 1837

= Cycloes =

Genus of crabs

Cycloes is a genus of crabs in the family Calappidae, containing the following species:

- Cycloes bairdii Stimpson, 1860
- Cycloes granulosa De Haan, 1837
- Cycloes marisrubri Galil & Clark, 1996
