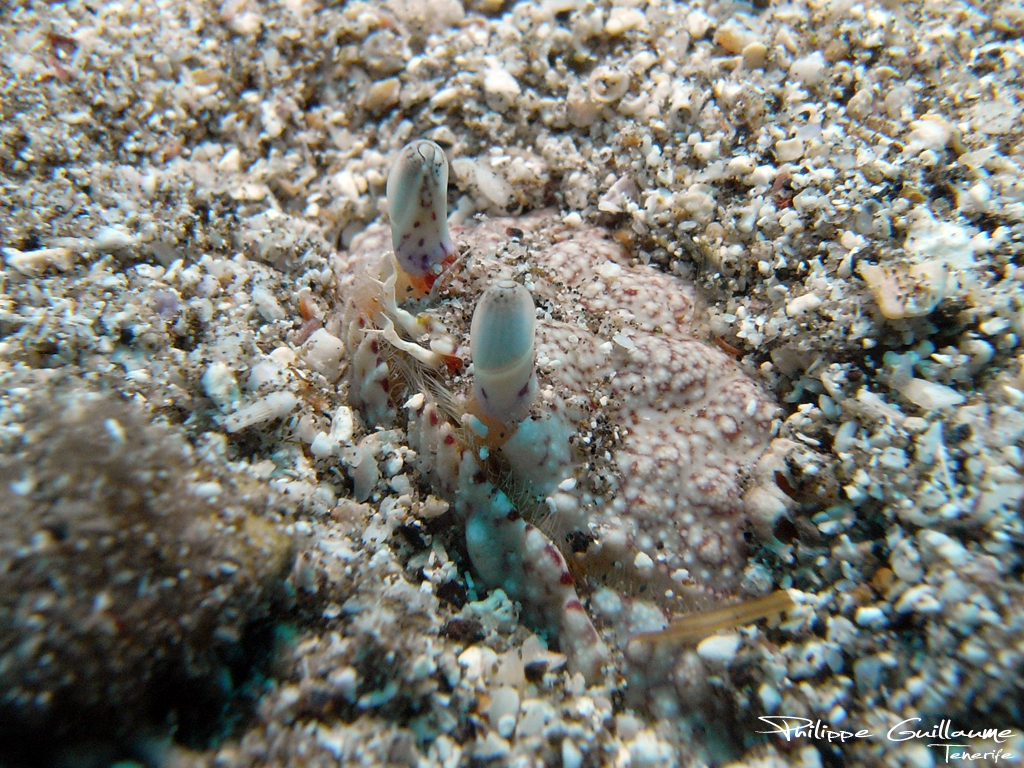
- Cryptosoma cristatum

Scientific classification
- Kingdom: Animalia
- Phylum: Arthropoda
- Class: Malacostraca
- Order: Decapoda
- Suborder: Pleocyemata
- Infraorder: Brachyura
- Family: Calappidae
- Genus: Cryptosoma; Brullé, 1837

= Cryptosoma =

Genus of crabs

Cryptosoma is a genus of crabs in the family Calappidae, containing the following species:

- Cryptosoma bairdii (Stimpson, 1860)
- Cryptosoma balguerii (Desbonne, in Desbonne & Schramm, 1867)
- Cryptosoma cristatum Brullé, 1837
- Cryptosoma dentatum Brullé, 1839
- Cryptosoma garthi Galil & Clark, 1996
- Cryptosoma orientis Adams & White, 1849
- Cryptosoma pallidum Selenka, de Man & Bülow, 1883
- Cryptosoma strombi Selenka, de Man & Bülow, 1883
