= Anisodontea elegans =

Scientific classification
- Kingdom: Plantae
- Clade: Tracheophytes
- Clade: Angiosperms
- Clade: Eudicots
- Clade: Rosids
- Order: Malvales
- Family: Malvaceae
- Genus: Anisodontea
- Species: A. elegans

Binomial name
- Anisodontea elegans (Cav.) D.M.Bates, 1969

Synonyms
- Malva elegans Cav.; Sphaeralcea elegans (Cav.) G. Don

Species of flowering plant

Anisodontea elegans is a species in the tribe Malveae in the family Malvaceae. It is endemic to the Cape Provinces of South Africa.
