= Platymera =

Scientific classification
- Kingdom: Animalia
- Phylum: Arthropoda
- Class: Malacostraca
- Order: Decapoda
- Suborder: Pleocyemata
- Infraorder: Brachyura
- Family: Calappidae
- Genus: Platymera; H. Milne-Edwards, 1837

Genus of crabs

Platymera is a genus of crabs in the family Calappidae, containing the following species:

- Platymera californiensis Rathbun, 1894
- Platymera gaudichaudii H. Milne Edwards, 1837
