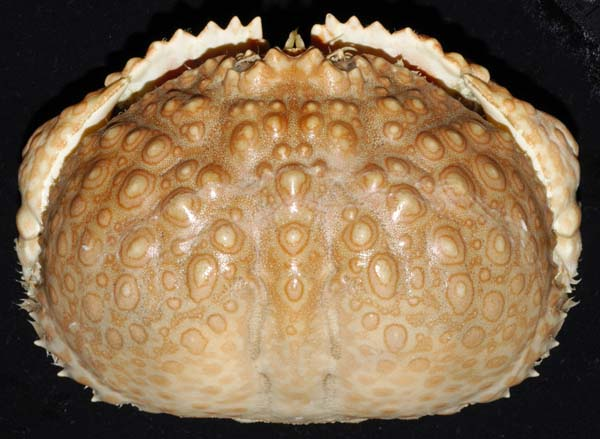

Scientific classification
- Kingdom: Animalia
- Phylum: Arthropoda
- Clade: Pancrustacea
- Class: Malacostraca
- Order: Decapoda
- Suborder: Pleocyemata
- Infraorder: Brachyura
- Family: Calappidae
- Genus: Calappa
- Species: C. japonica

Binomial name
- Calappa japonica Ortmann, 1892

= Calappa japonica =

Species of crab

Calappa japonica, also known as the Japanese shame-faced crab, is a marine species of box crab in the family Calappidae. Originally found in the waters around Japan, more recently it has been found in Africa, the Red Sea and Western Australia.

== Description ==
Calappa japonica is a large crab, and has a yellow and red colouration. The length of carapace is approximately .65 times the width, with a tuberculated surface. Seven sharp teeth are located around the margins of each clypeiform expansion.

== Distribution and habitat ==
This species was first discovered in Tokyo Bay, Japan. It is now known to occur in regions as far away as Africa and Western Australia, and lives in waters up to 250 m (820 ft) deep. as well as being found in the Red Sea.

== Behaviour and diet ==
This crab is a predator, and feeds on invertebrates such as other crabs, as well as oysters and snails. It has a specially adapted right pincer which it uses to break open snail's shells. There is a large accessory tooth located at the base of the hinged part of the claw located opposite a flat plate on the fixed part, and it uses these as a vice. After breaking open the shell, it uses its left pincer, which is sharper and longer than the right one, and better at picking out the soft tissues. When it is disturbed, it folds its chelae (pincers) in front of its face and retracts its walking legs, forming a compact, well-armoured box-like structure; this defensive stance makes it appear to be embarrassed, and has led to its receiving the name, "shame-faced crab".
