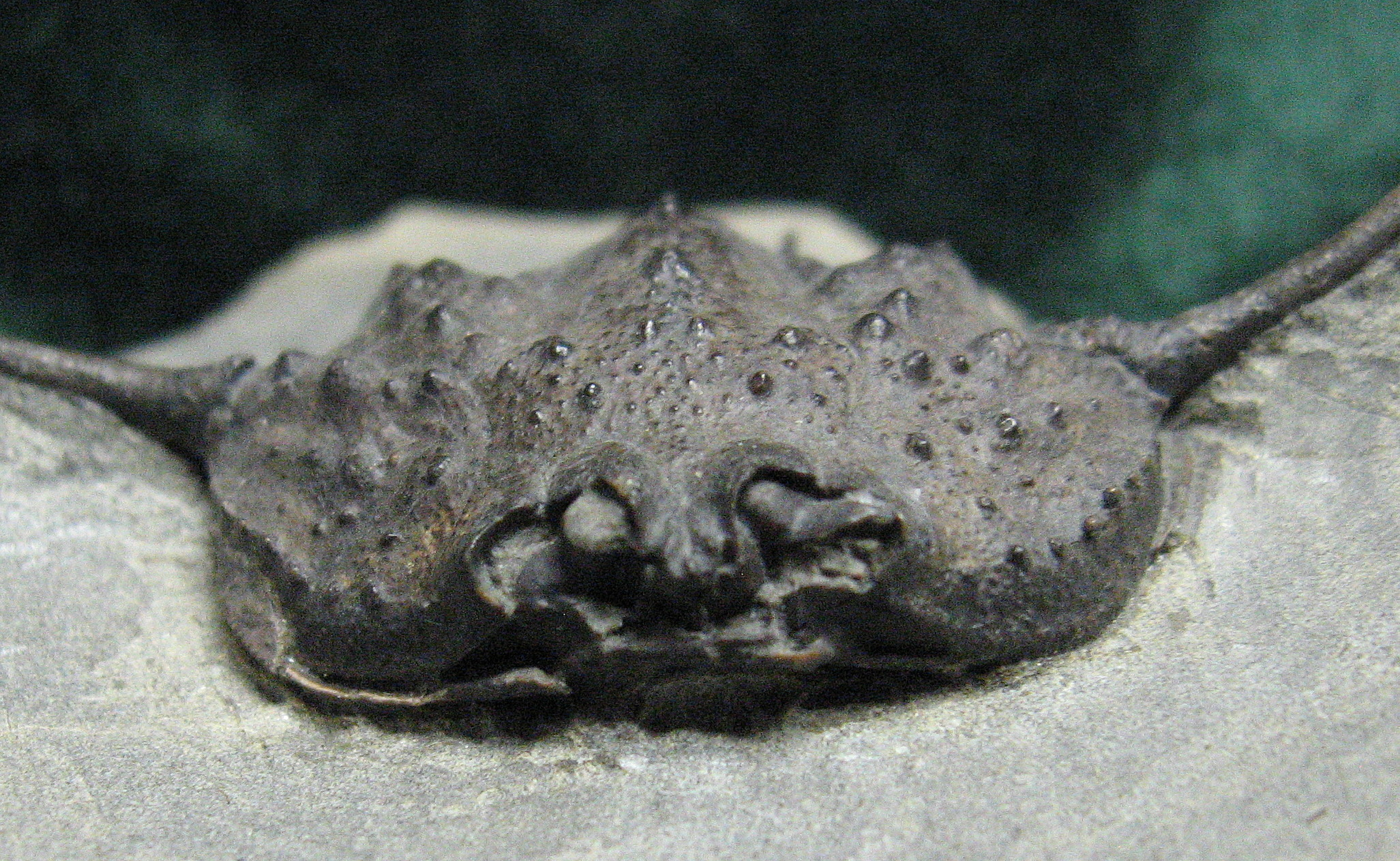
- Mursia marcusana

Scientific classification
- Kingdom: Animalia
- Phylum: Arthropoda
- Class: Malacostraca
- Order: Decapoda
- Suborder: Pleocyemata
- Infraorder: Brachyura
- Family: Calappidae
- Genus: Mursia; Desmarest, 1823

= Mursia =

Genus of crabs

Mursia is a genus of crabs in the family Calappidae, containing the following species:

- Mursia africana Galil, 1993
- Mursia armata De Haan, 1837
- Mursia aspera Alcock, 1899
- Mursia aurorae Galil & Ng, 2009
- Mursia australiensis Campbell, 1971
- Mursia baconaua Galil & Takeda, 2004
- Mursia balguerii Desbonne in Desbonne & Schramm, 1867
- Mursia bicristimana Alcock & Anderson, 1895
- Mursia buwaya Galil & Takeda, 2004
- Mursia coseli Crosnier, 1997
- Mursia cristiata H. Milne-Edwards, 1837
- Mursia cristimanus De Haan, 1837
- Mursia curtispina Miers, 1886
- Mursia danigoi Galil, 1993
- Mursia diwata Galil & Takeda, 2004
- Mursia flamma Galil, 1993
- Mursia hawaiiensis Rathbun, 1894
- Mursia longispina Crosnier, 1997
- Mursia mameleu Galil & Takeda, 2004
- Mursia mcdowelli Manning & Chace, 1990
- †Mursia marcusana Rathbun, 1926
- Mursia microspina Davie & Short, 1989
- Mursia minuta Spiridonov & Apel, 2007
- Mursia musorstomia Galil, 1993
- Mursia orientalia Galil & Takeda, 2005
- Mursia poupini Galil, 2001
- Mursia spinimanus Rathbun, 1906
- Mursia steinhardti Galil & Ng, 2009
- Mursia trispinosa Parisi, 1914
- Mursia xianshengi Lai & Galil, 2006
- Mursia zarenkovi Galil & Spiridonov, 1998
