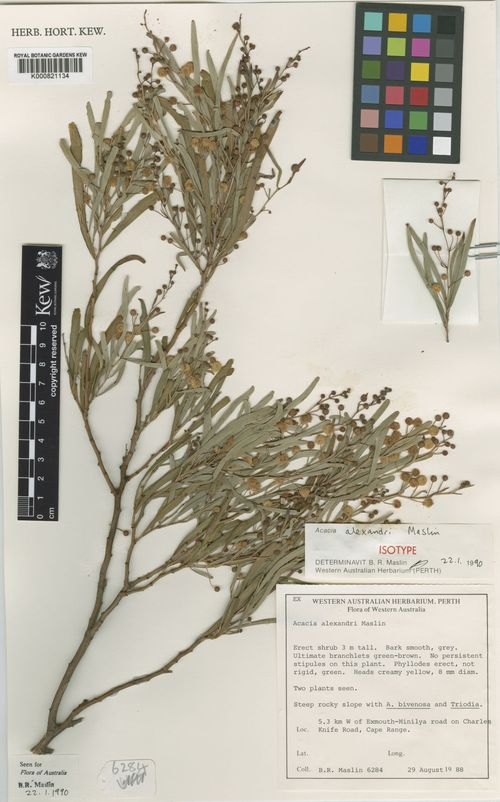
- Holotype

Conservation status
- Priority Three — Poorly Known Taxa (DEC)

Scientific classification
- Kingdom: Plantae
- Clade: Tracheophytes
- Clade: Angiosperms
- Clade: Eudicots
- Clade: Rosids
- Order: Fabales
- Family: Fabaceae
- Subfamily: Caesalpinioideae
- Clade: Mimosoid clade
- Genus: Acacia
- Species: A. alexandri

Binomial name
- Acacia alexandri Maslin
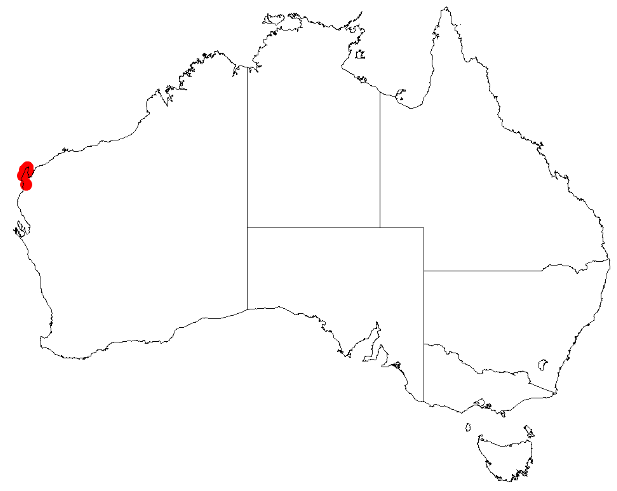
- Occurrence data from AVH

Synonyms
- Acacia aff. victoriae (A.S.George 10270); Racosperma alexandri (Maslin) Pedley

= Acacia alexandri =

Species of legume

Acacia alexandri is a species of flowering plant in the family Fabaceae and is endemic to the Cape Range in the north-west of Western Australia. It is a glabrous shrub with slender branchlets, linear phyllodes, and cream-coloured flowers arranged in 1 or 2 spherical heads in the axils of phyllodes, and narrowly oblong, papery pods up to 70 mm (2.8 in) long.

== Description ==
Acacia alexandri is a glabrous, open or moderately dense shrub that typically grows to a height of 1.5–3 m (4 ft 11 in – 9 ft 10 in) and has slender branchlets. Its phyllodes are linear, narrowed at the base, 60–130 mm (2.4–5.1 in) long and 2.5–6 mm (0.098–0.236 in) wide, 9–11 mm (0.35–0.43 in) wide on some specimens. There are spiny stipules 3–4 mm (0.12–0.16 in) long at the base of phyllodes, but sometimes absent from mature phyllodes. There is a sometimes obscure gland up to 2 mm (0.079 in) above the pulvinus.

The flowers are arranged 1 or 2 spherical heads in the axils of phyllodes, on a peduncle 8–15 mm (0.31–0.59 in) long with 60 to 80 cream-coloured flowers. Flowering mostly occurs from August to September, and the pod is papery, narrowly oblong, and prominently rounded over the seeds, up to 70 mm (2.8 in) long and 7–8 mm (0.28–0.31 in) wide. The seeds are dull blackish, spherical and about 4 mm (0.16 in) long.

== Taxonomy ==
Acacia alexandri was first formally described in 1992 by Bruce Maslin in the journal Nuytsia from specimens he collected in the Cape Range in 1988. The specific epithet (alexandri) honours Alex George, who discovered the species in 1960.

== Distribution and habitat ==
This species of wattle is endemic to the Cape Range in the Gascoyne region of Western Australia around Cape Range where it is found on rocky limestone hillsides as part of mallee shrubland communities growing in rocky, pink loamy soils.

== Conservation status ==
Acacia alexandri is listed as "Priority Three" by the Government of Western Australia Department of Parks and Wildlife, meaning that it is poorly known and known from only a few locations but is not under imminent threat.

== See also ==
- List of Acacia species
