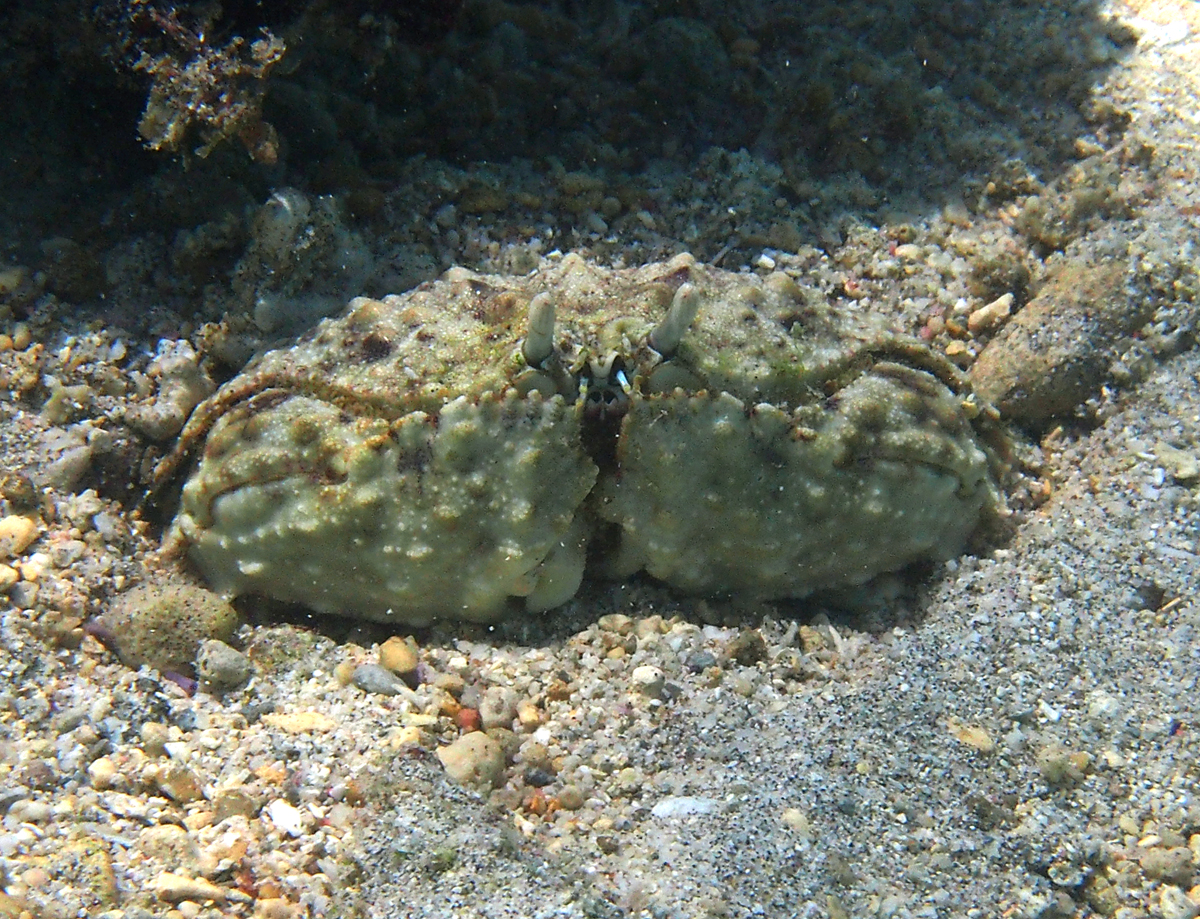
- Calappa hepatica

Scientific classification
- Kingdom: Animalia
- Phylum: Arthropoda
- Clade: Pancrustacea
- Class: Malacostraca
- Order: Decapoda
- Suborder: Pleocyemata
- Infraorder: Brachyura
- Family: Calappidae
- Genus: Calappa; Weber, 1795

= Calappa (crab) =

Calappa Temporal range: Paleogene - Recent

Genus of crabs

Calappa is a genus of crabs known commonly as box crabs or shame-faced crabs. The name box crab comes from their distinctly bulky carapace, and the name shame-faced is from anthropomorphising the way the crab's chelae (claws) fold up and cover its face, as if it were hiding its face in shame. The name calappa is associated with kelapa, the Malay word for 'coconut'.

== Distribution ==
Calappa are benthic and found on sandy, shelly, and muddy seabeds. They are found from the shore to depths of around 150 m (500 ft), with some species being found deeper at around 250 m (820 ft). They commonly inhabit reef areas, seagrass beds, and sandy flats where they can easily burrow and camouflage with the surrounding environment. They are typically found in warm marine environments, favoring tropical and subtropical climates. Many species, like Calappa calappa and Calappa hepatica, are common in the Indo-Pacific region and can be found in areas such as the Red Sea, Hawaii, French Polynesia, Cocos Island, and northern Australia. They can be found in other parts of the world, such as Calappa granulata, which has been found in the Mediterranean Sea and off the coast of Venezuela. Other species have also been found in Central America.

== Description ==
Calappa generally range in carapace width from about 6–15 cm (2.5–6 in). Most Calappa have a broad, rounded, and convex carapace. This in conjunction with its broad, flat, shield-like claws give the crab a box-like appearance. The claws' shielding posture gives rise to the other common name, "shame-faced crabs". Calappa are often difficult to distinguish based on morphology alone, and thus molecular phylogenetics are sometimes used alongside morphometrics to identify specimens with unique color patterns, size ranges, and textures.

== Behavior ==
Calappa are known to burrow in the seabed. They push their chelae forward against the substratum which in turn pushes their carapace down and backward into the sediment. Through this process, Calappa either submerges itself completely or leaves just its eyes exposed. This burial process disturbs the substratum and has been observed to inadvertently aid fish in hunting invertebrates and small fish hiding in the seabed.

Calappa's chelae are specialized for feeding on marine gastropods and bivalves. A study of the feeding behavior of C. ocellata found that the chelae are of about equal size but differ noticeably in function and internal morphology. The right chela has a thick, calcified apodeme, broad teeth, and greater mechanical advantage than the left. It is used to crush or shear shells, but it is not robust for this task. Likely to compensate for this, the outside face of the right chela additionally features a "peg and cusp" structure which is used like a can opener to break the lip of gastropod shells. The left chela is slim, pointed in a beak-like fashion, lined with small, pointed teeth along the propodus, and fringed with setae which may be used for sensing. It is used for faster or more delicate tasks such as holding a shell in place during crushing, picking flesh from crushed prey, and possibly capturing agile prey.

== Species ==
Calappa contains the following extant species:

- Calappa acutispina Lai, Chan & Ng, 2006
- Calappa africana Lai & Ng, 2006
- Calappa bicornis Miers, 1884
- Calappa bilineata Ng, Lai & Aungtonya, 2002
- Calappa calappa (Linnaeus, 1758)
- Calappa capellonis Laurie, 1906
- Calappa cinerea Holthuis, 1958
- Calappa clypeata Borradaile, 1903
- Calappa conifera Galil, 1997
- Calappa convexa Saussure, 1853
- Calappa dumortieri Guinot, 1962
- Calappa exanthematosa Alcock & Anderson, 1894
- Calappa flammea (Herbst, 1794)
- Calappa galloides Stimpson, 1859
- Calappa gallus (Herbst, 1803)
- Calappa granulata (Linnaeus, 1758)
- Calappa guerini De Brito Capello, 1871
- Calappa hepatica (Linnaeus, 1758)
- Calappa japonica Ortmann, 1892
- Calappa karenae Ng & Lai, 2012
- Calappa liaoi Ng, 2002
- Calappa lophos (Herbst, 1782)
- Calappa monilicanthus Latreille, 1812
- Calappa nitida Galil, 1997
- Calappa ocellata Holthuis, 1958
- Calappa ocularia Holthuis, 1958
- Calappa pelii Herklots, 1851
- Calappa philargius (Linnaeus, 1758)
- Calappa pokipoki Ng, 2000
- Calappa pustulosa Alcock, 1896
- Calappa quadrimaculata Takeda & Shikatani, 1990
- Calappa rosea Jarocki, 1825
- Calappa rubroguttata Herklots, 1851
- Calappa sebastieni Galil, 1997
- Calappa springeri Rathbun, 1931
- Calappa sulcata Rathbun, 1898
- Calappa torulosa Galil, 1997
- Calappa tuberculata (Fabricius, 1793)
- Calappa undulata Dai & Yang, 1991
- Calappa woodmasoni Alcock, 1896
- Calappa yamasitae Sakai, 1980
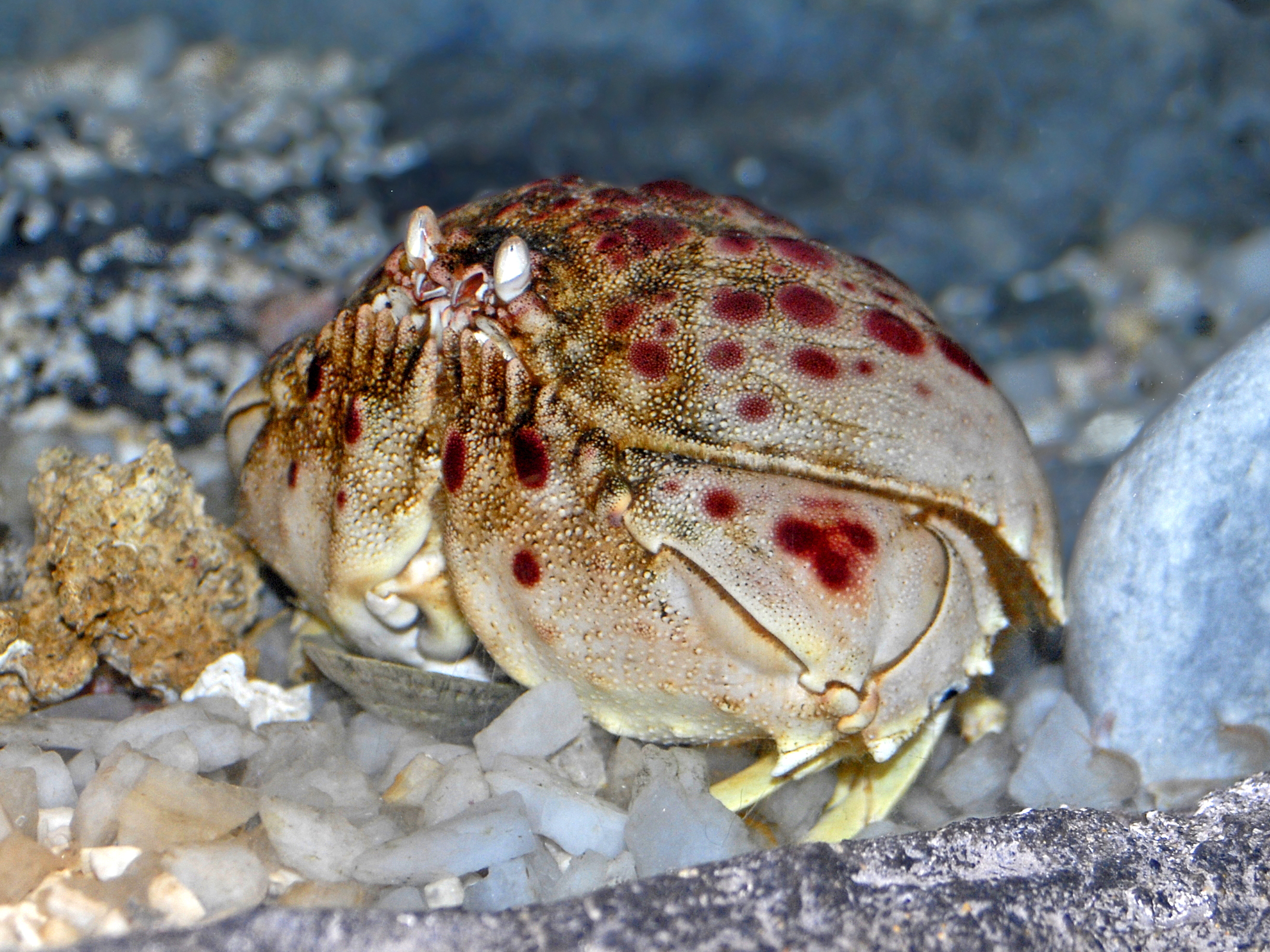
Calappa calappa

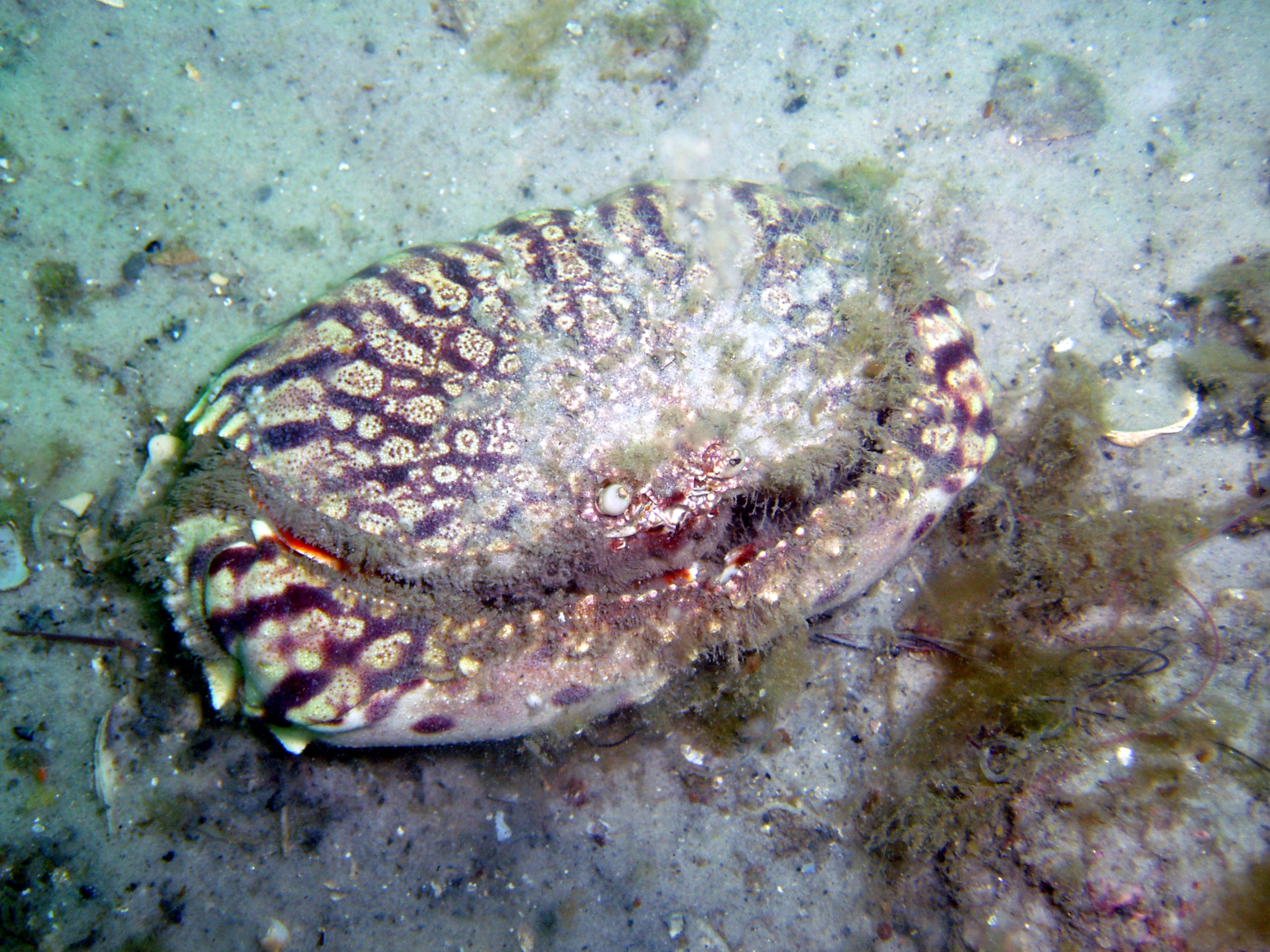
Calappa flammea

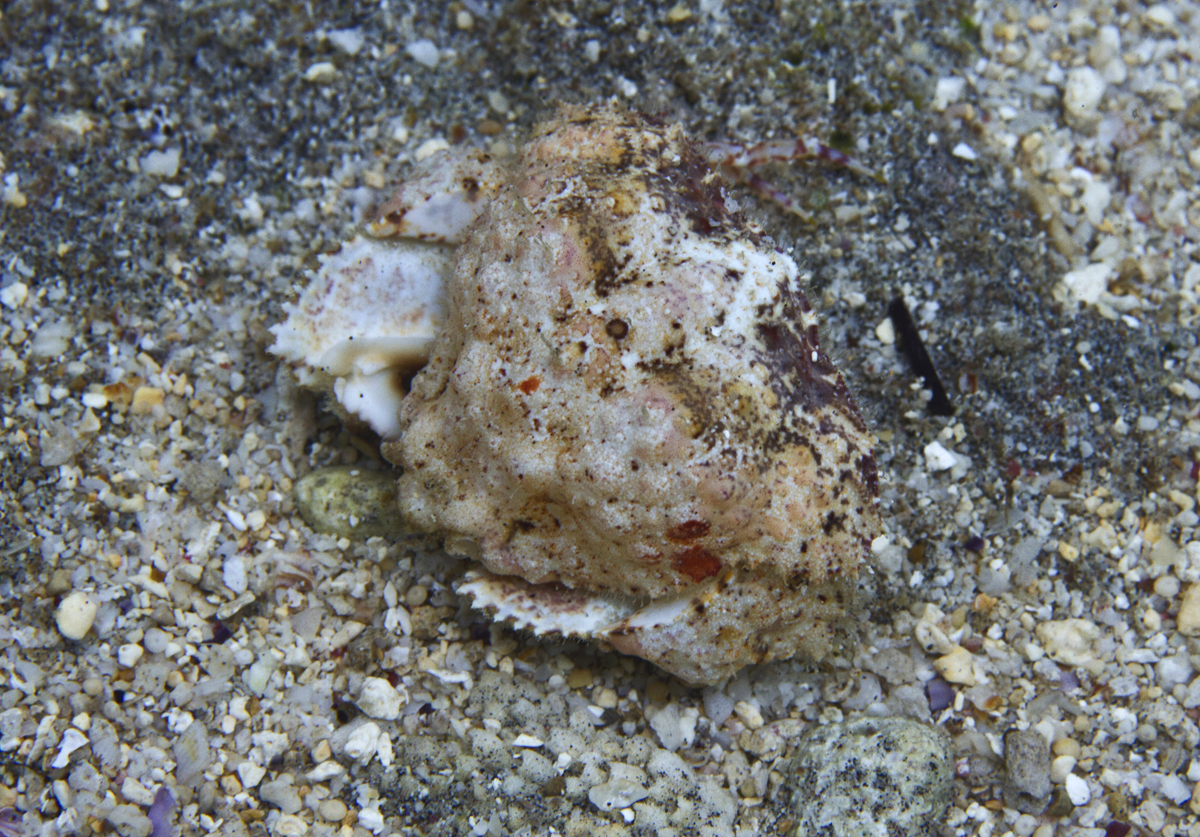
Calappa gallus

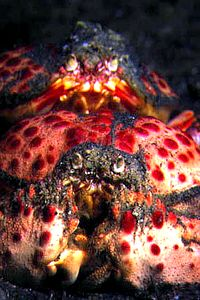
Calappa granulata

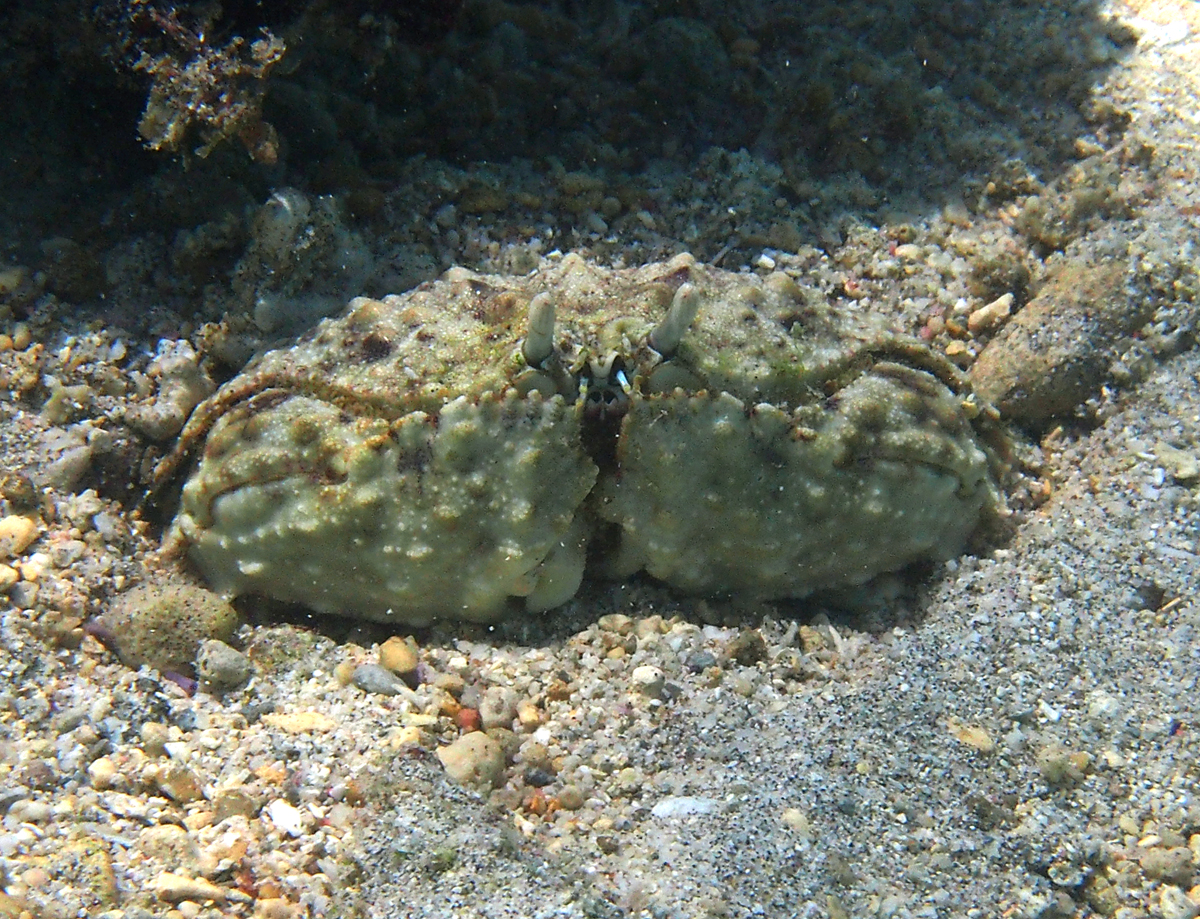
Calappa hepatica

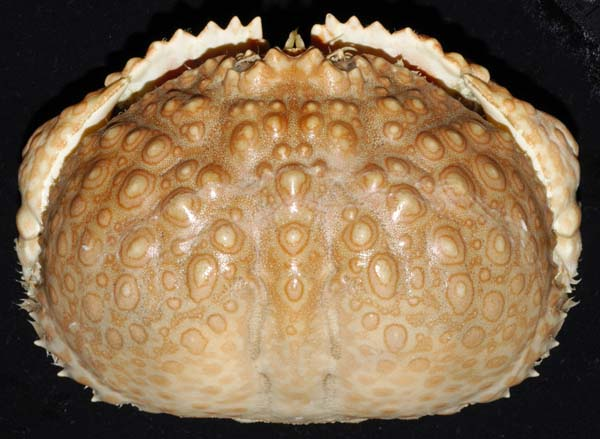
Calappa japonica

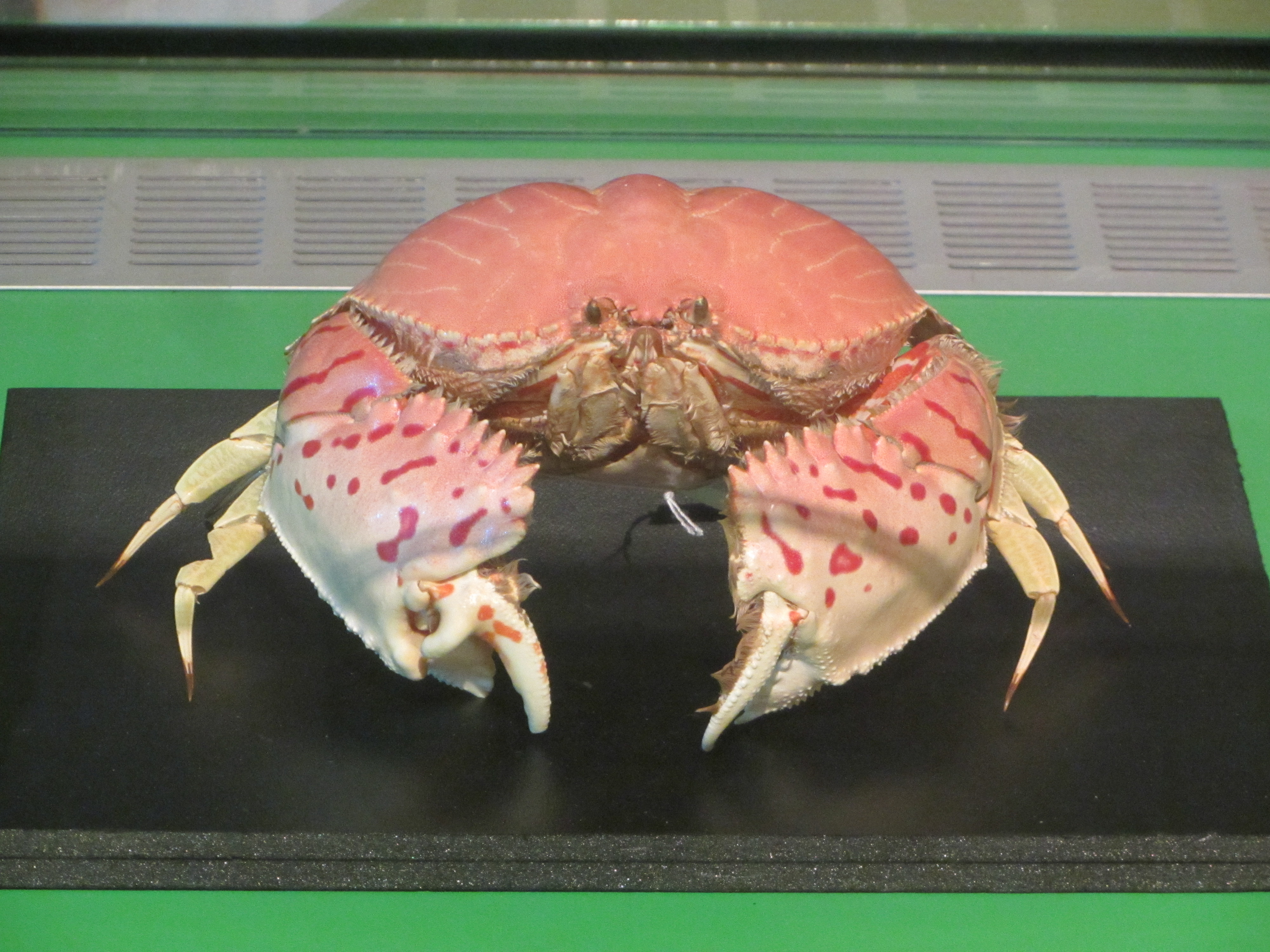
Calappa lophos

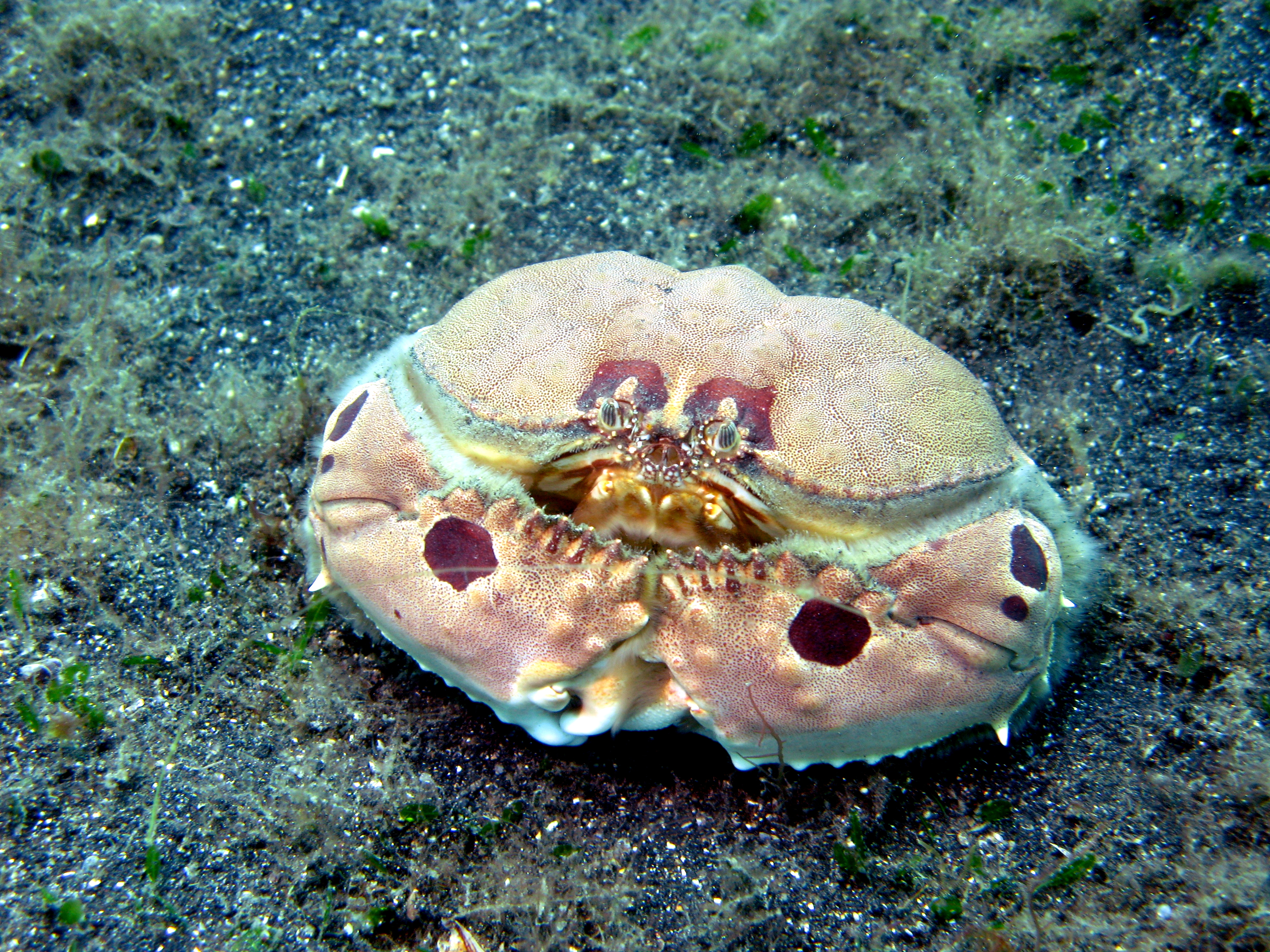
Calappa philargius

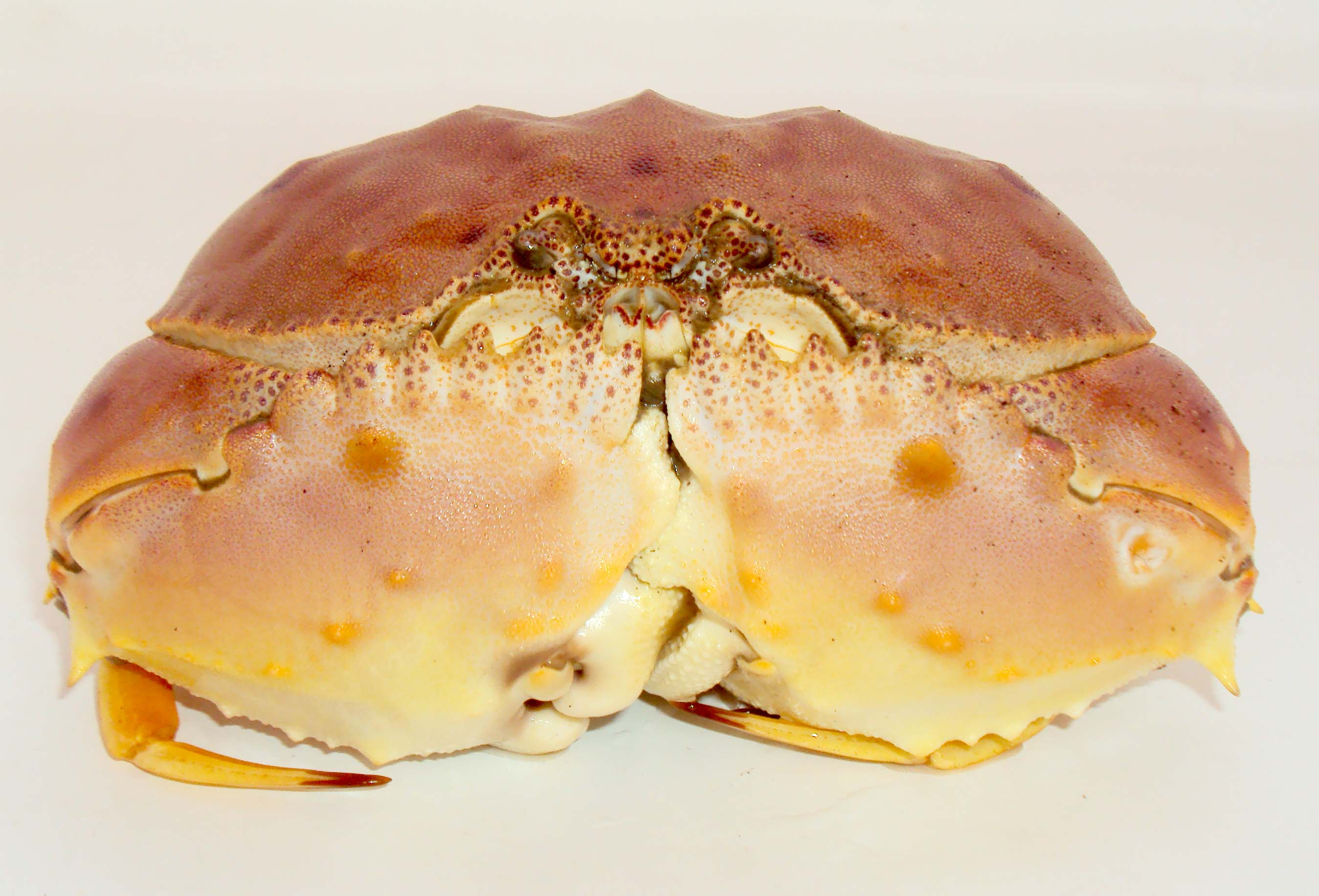
Calappa sulcata

=== Extinct species ===
Calappa contains the following extinct species:

- †Calappa chungii Hu & Tao, 1985
- †Calappa costaricana Rathbun, 1918
- †Calappa cuspidata (Guppy, 1909)
- †Calappa damarcoi Pasini & Garassino, 2017
- †Calappa earlei Withers, 1924
- †Calappa heberti Brocchi, 1883
- †Calappa lanensis Rathbun, 1926
- †Calappa laraensis Van Straelen, 1933
- †Calappa madoerensis Van Straelen, 1938
- †Calappa oboui Hu & Tao, 1996
- †Calappa ocalanus (Ross, Lewis & Scolaro, 1964)
- †Calappa pavimenta Schweitzer, Iturralde-Vinent, Hetler & Velez-Juarbe, 2006
- †Calappa praelata Lőrenthey in Lőrenthey & Beurlen, 1929
- †Calappa protopustulosa Noetling, 1901
- †Calappa restricta Milne-Edwards, 1873
- †Calappa robertsi Ross, 1964
- †Calappa sahelensis Van Straelen, 1936
- †Calappa sangiranensis Van Straelen, 1938
- †Calappa sexapinosa Morris & Collins, 1991
- †Calappa zinsmeisteri Feldmann & Wilson, 1988
- †Calappa zurcheri Bouvier, 1899

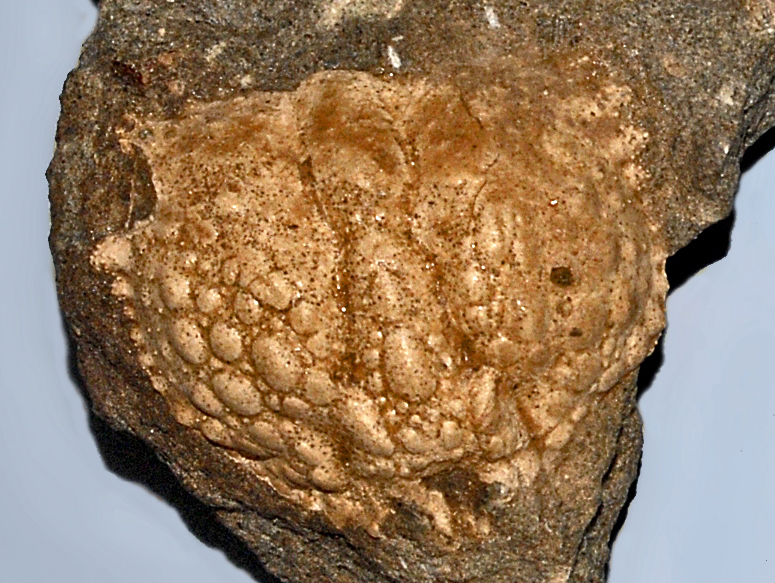
Fossil of Calappa species

Fossils of species within this genus can be found in sediment of Europe, United States, Mexico, Central America, Australia and Japan from Paleogene to recent (age range: 33.9 to 0.0 Ma).

== See also ==
- Coconut crab
