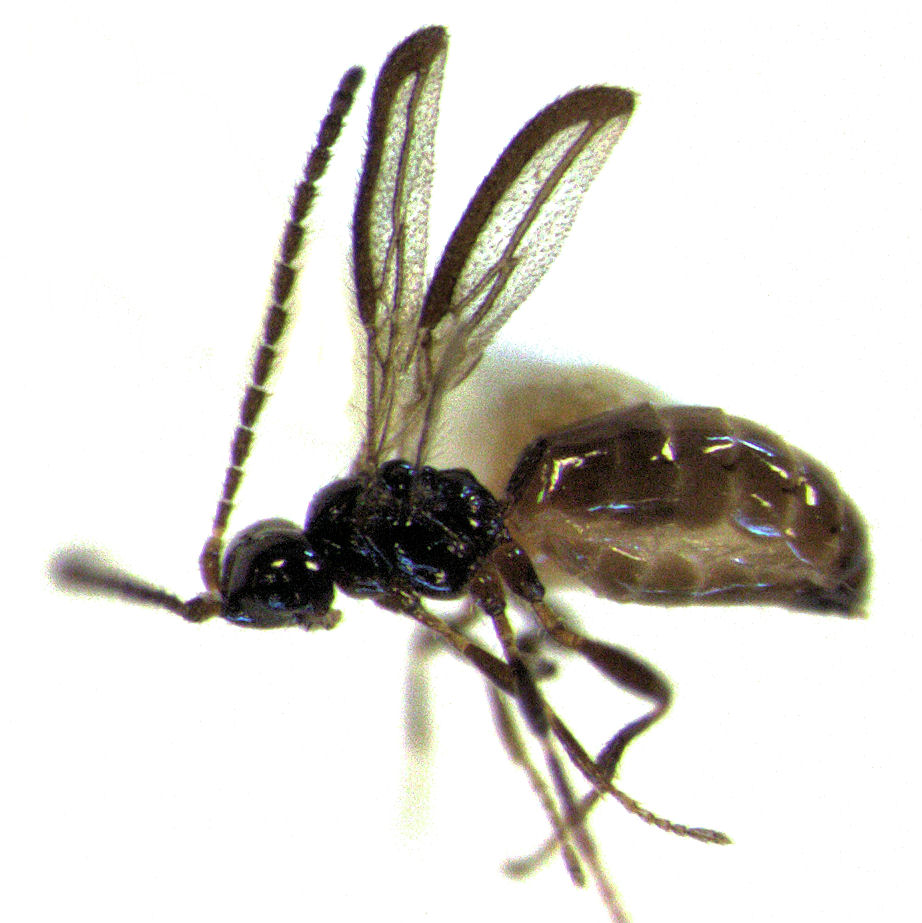
- Adult Aspilota albertica

Scientific classification
- Domain: Eukaryota
- Kingdom: Animalia
- Phylum: Arthropoda
- Class: Insecta
- Order: Hymenoptera
- Family: Braconidae
- Genus: Aspilota; Förster, 1863

Species
- See text

= Aspilota =

Genus of wasps

Aspilota is a genus of insect from the Braconidae family.

Subgenera:

- Aspilota (Eusynaldis); earlier treated as its own genera Eusynaldis Zaykov & Fischer, 1982
- Aspilota (Synaldis); earlier treated as its own genera Synaldis Förster, 1863

== Species ==
The following species are accepted within Aspilota:

- Aspilota acricornis
- Aspilota acutistigma
- Aspilota adventa
- Aspilota aestiva
- Aspilota affinis
- Aspilota ahrburgensis
- Aspilota albiapex
- Aspilota alexanderi
- Aspilota alexandri
- Aspilota anaphoretica
- Aspilota andyaustini
- Aspilota angusticornis
- Aspilota aniva
- Aspilota anneae
- Aspilota antzyferovi
- Aspilota armillariae
- Aspilota arsenievi
- Aspilota astoriensis
- Aspilota atlasovi
- Aspilota aureliana
- Aspilota austroussurica
- Aspilota beringi
- Aspilota betae
- Aspilota blasii
- Aspilota brachybasis
- Aspilota brachyclypeata
- Aspilota brachyptera
- Aspilota brandti
- Aspilota breviantennata
- Aspilota brevicauda
- Aspilota brunigaster
- Aspilota brunnea
- Aspilota bucculatricis
- Aspilota budogosskii
- Aspilota capitata
- Aspilota caudatula
- Aspilota cetiusmontis
- Aspilota ceylonica
- Aspilota chanka
- Aspilota chinganica
- Aspilota claricornis
- Aspilota clayensis
- Aspilota columbiana
- Aspilota communis
- Aspilota compressa
- Aspilota compressigaster
- Aspilota compressiventris
- Aspilota converginervis
- Aspilota convexula
- Aspilota cubitalaris
- Aspilota cultrata
- Aspilota curta
- Aspilota curtibasis
- Aspilota daemon
- Aspilota dangerfieldi
- Aspilota danuvica
- Aspilota delicata
- Aspilota deserta
- Aspilota dezhnevi
- Aspilota digitula
- Aspilota diminuata
- Aspilota discoidea
- Aspilota disstriae
- Aspilota divergens
- Aspilota dmitrii
- Aspilota ecur
- Aspilota efoveolata
- Aspilota elongata
- Aspilota ephemera
- Aspilota eumandibulata
- Aspilota eurugosa
- Aspilota extremicornis
- Aspilota farra
- Aspilota ferrugenosa
- Aspilota flagellaris
- Aspilota flagimilis
- Aspilota florens
- Aspilota floridensis
- Aspilota foliformis
- Aspilota foutsi
- Aspilota fukushimai
- Aspilota furtnerana
- Aspilota fuscicornis
- Aspilota girlanda
- Aspilota glabrimedia
- Aspilota golovnini
- Aspilota gorbusha
- Aspilota hastata
- Aspilota hirticornis
- Aspilota impar
- Aspilota imparidens
- Aspilota incongruens
- Aspilota indica
- Aspilota inflatinervis
- Aspilota inflatitempus
- Aspilota insolita
- Aspilota insularis
- Aspilota intermediana
- Aspilota intermissa
- Aspilota iocosipecta
- Aspilota isfahanensis
- Aspilota isometrica
- Aspilota iuxtanaeviam
- Aspilota izyaslavi
- Aspilota jabingensis
- Aspilota jaculans
- Aspilota jakovlevi
- Aspilota johnbrackeni
- Aspilota kalinovka
- Aspilota kaplanovi
- Aspilota karafuta
- Aspilota karelica
- Aspilota kemneri
- Aspilota komarovi
- Aspilota konae
- Aspilota konishii
- Aspilota korsakovi
- Aspilota kotenkoi
- Aspilota kozyrevskii
- Aspilota krombeini
- Aspilota kurilicola
- Aspilota laevinota
- Aspilota latidens
- Aspilota latipelus
- Aspilota latitemporata
- Aspilota latitergum
- Aspilota leptocornis
- Aspilota lobidens
- Aspilota longibasis
- Aspilota longicarinata
- Aspilota longifemur
- Aspilota longiflagellata
- Aspilota louiseae
- Aspilota maacki
- Aspilota macrops
- Aspilota makita
- Aspilota manandrianaensis
- Aspilota megastigmatica
- Aspilota melabasis
- Aspilota microcera
- Aspilota microcubitalis
- Aspilota middendorffi
- Aspilota minima
- Aspilota minutissima
- Aspilota miraculosa
- Aspilota muravievi
- Aspilota nacta
- Aspilota naeviformis
- Aspilota nasica
- Aspilota necopinata
- Aspilota nemorivaga
- Aspilota nemostigma
- Aspilota neoterica
- Aspilota nervulata
- Aspilota nescita
- Aspilota nevae
- Aspilota nevelskoii
- Aspilota nidicola
- Aspilota nigrina
- Aspilota nipponica
- Aspilota nobilis
- Aspilota nomas
- Aspilota nonna
- Aspilota notata
- Aspilota nuntius
- Aspilota nutricola
- Aspilota obsessor
- Aspilota obsoleta
- Aspilota occulta
- Aspilota odarka
- Aspilota ordinaria
- Aspilota oriens
- Aspilota oroszi
- Aspilota parallela
- Aspilota parentalis
- Aspilota parvistigma
- Aspilota pauciarticulata
- Aspilota paupera
- Aspilota perai
- Aspilota petiolata
- Aspilota phyllotomae
- Aspilota pillerensis
- Aspilota pitiensis
- Aspilota pitralon
- Aspilota poiarkovi
- Aspilota praescutellaris
- Aspilota procreata
- Aspilota propedaemon
- Aspilota propeminimam
- Aspilota przewalskii
- Aspilota pulchella
- Aspilota puliciformis
- Aspilota pumiliformis
- Aspilota pygmipunctum
- Aspilota raddei
- Aspilota riazanovi
- Aspilota rufa
- Aspilota ruficornis
- Aspilota rugisignum
- Aspilota saileri
- Aspilota schlainingiaca
- Aspilota schpanbergi
- Aspilota schrenki
- Aspilota semiinsularis
- Aspilota semipilosa
- Aspilota shannoni
- Aspilota shiramizui
- Aspilota signimembris
- Aspilota sikkimensis
- Aspilota sinibasis
- Aspilota sitkensis
- Aspilota smithi
- Aspilota spiracula
- Aspilota spiracularis
- Aspilota stenogaster
- Aspilota stigmalineata
- Aspilota storeyi
- Aspilota styriaca
- Aspilota subcompressa
- Aspilota subcubiceps
- Aspilota supramedia
- Aspilota sylvaticae
- Aspilota tergitalis
- Aspilota tetragona
- Aspilota thurnensis
- Aspilota tianmushanica
- Aspilota tiatinoi
- Aspilota tillyardi
- Aspilota tshandolaz
- Aspilota tshirikovi
- Aspilota tuberula
- Aspilota turgida
- Aspilota ulmicola
- Aspilota ultor
- Aspilota umbritarsata
- Aspilota umbrosa
- Aspilota unca
- Aspilota univoca
- Aspilota vaga
- Aspilota valenciensis
- Aspilota vargus
- Aspilota variabilis
- Aspilota varinervis
- Aspilota vector
- Aspilota venatrix
- Aspilota ventasa
- Aspilota vernalis
- Aspilota viator
- Aspilota vicina
- Aspilota vincibilis
- Aspilota vindex
- Aspilota violator
- Aspilota visibilis
- Aspilota vladimirovka
- Aspilota vodara
- Aspilota volans
- Aspilota vostok
- Aspilota wilhelmensis
- Aspilota xuexini
- Aspilota ylia
