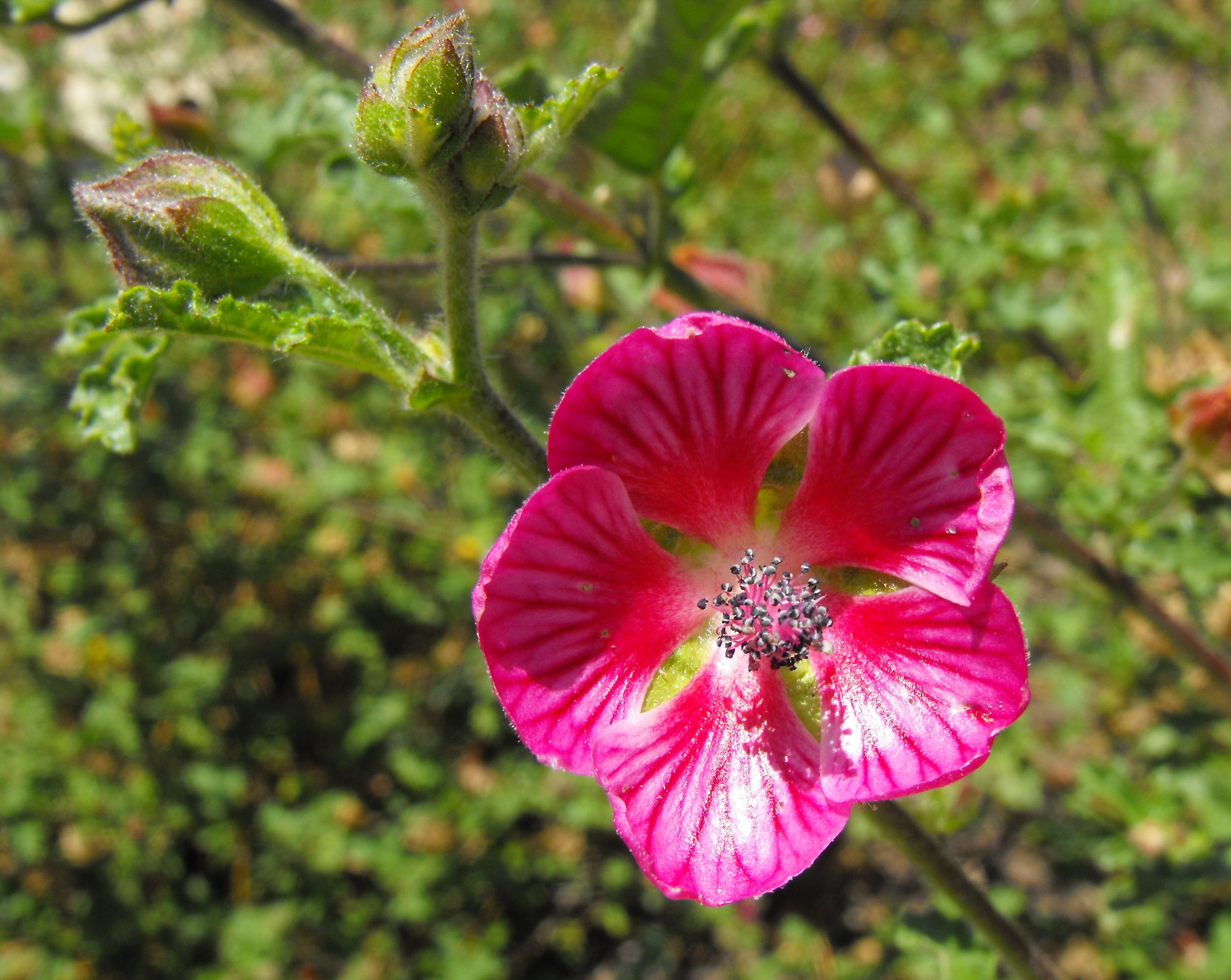
- Anisodontea × hypomandarum

Scientific classification
- Kingdom: Plantae
- Clade: Tracheophytes
- Clade: Angiosperms
- Clade: Eudicots
- Clade: Rosids
- Order: Malvales
- Family: Malvaceae
- Subfamily: Malvoideae
- Tribe: Malveae
- Genus: Anisodontea; C.Presl

Species
- 19; see text

Synonyms
- Malveopsis C.Presl

= Anisodontea =

Genus of South African plants

Anisodontea is a genus of flowering plants in the tribe Malveae of the mallow family Malvaceae. It comprises 19 species native to South Africa and Lesotho. Members of the genus typically bear toothed leaves with three or five palmate, uneven lobes. Members of the genus also typically bear flowers with a pubescent calyx, a five-petaled corolla streaked from the center and pink to magenta in color, and stamens with anthers of a dark color.

== Cultivation ==
Members of the genus are classed as half-hardy. They thrive in cool-temperate climates and are used as summer bedding and in mild coastal areas where they may be grown as border plants. For several species, the seeds should be sown in spring. Half-harden cuttings should be taken in summer but need bottom heat. They do best in loam-based gritty compost and positioned in full sun.

Anisodontea capensis, the African mallow, is a recipient of the Royal Horticultural Society's Award of Garden Merit.

== Species ==
19 species are accepted.

- Anisodontea alexandrii (Baker f.) D.M.Bates
- Anisodontea anomala (Link & Otto) D.M.Bates
- Anisodontea biflora (Desr.) D.M.Bates
- Anisodontea bryoniifolia (L.) D.M.Bates
- Anisodontea capensis (L.) D.M.Bates
- Anisodontea dissecta (Harv.) D.M.Bates
- Anisodontea elegans (Cav.) D.M.Bates
- Anisodontea fruticosa (P.J.Bergius) D.M.Bates
- Anisodontea gracilis D.M.Bates
- Anisodontea × hypomadara (Sprague) D.M.Bates
- Anisodontea julii (Burch. ex DC.) D.M.Bates
- Anisodontea malvastroides (Baker f.) D.M.Bates
- Anisodontea procumbens (Harv.) D.M.Bates
- Anisodontea pseudocapensis D.M.Bates
- Anisodontea racemosa (Harv.) D.M.Bates
- Anisodontea reflexa (J.C.Wendl.) D.M.Bates
- Anisodontea scabrosa (L.) D.M.Bates
- Anisodontea setosa (Harv.) D.M.Bates
- Anisodontea theronii D.M.Bates
- Anisodontea triloba (Thunb.) D.M.Bates
