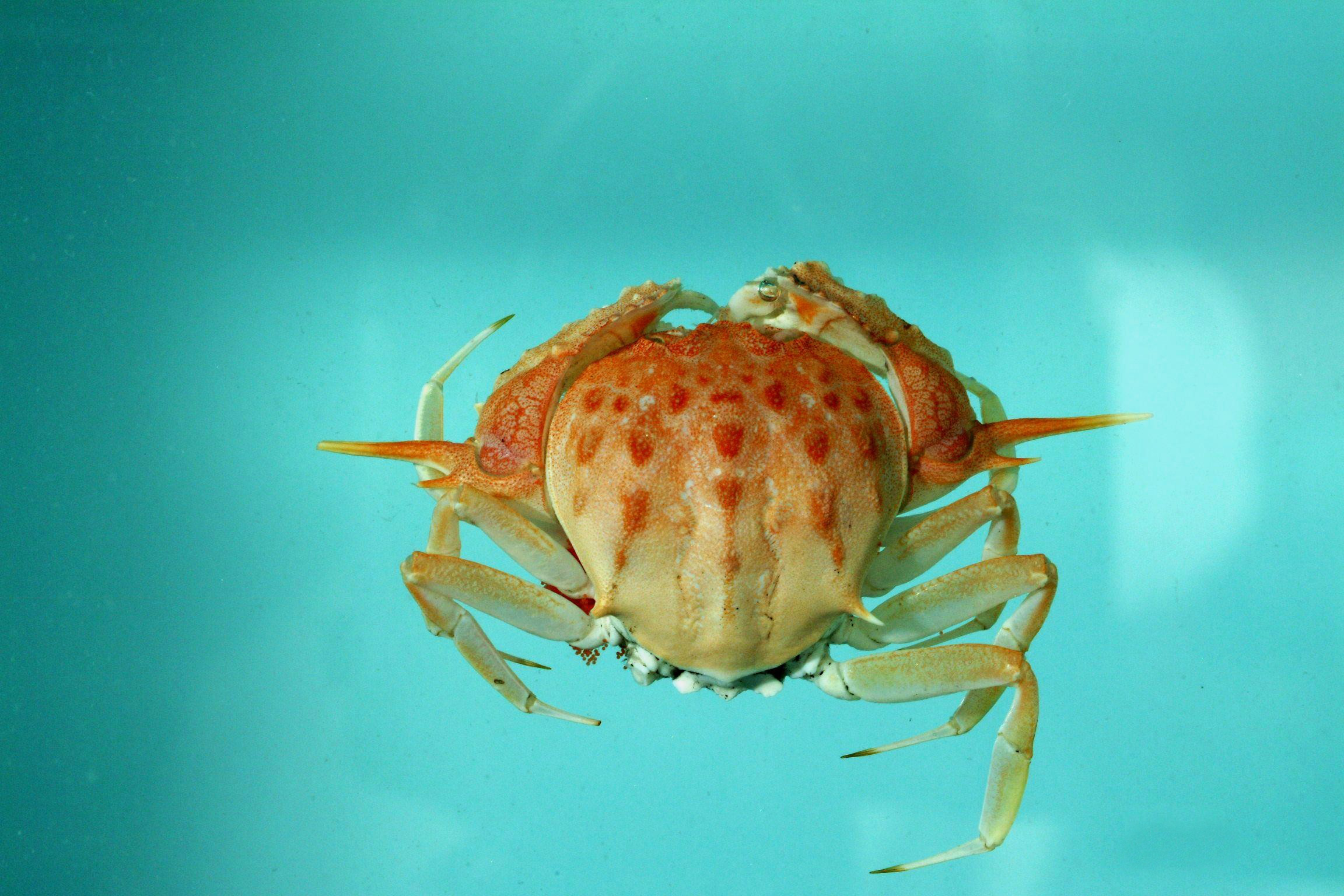
- Acanthocarpus alexandri

Scientific classification
- Domain: Eukaryota
- Kingdom: Animalia
- Phylum: Arthropoda
- Class: Malacostraca
- Order: Decapoda
- Suborder: Pleocyemata
- Infraorder: Brachyura
- Family: Calappidae
- Genus: Acanthocarpus; Stimpson, 1871

= Acanthocarpus (crab) =

Genus of crabs

Acanthocarpus is a genus of crabs in the family Calappidae, containing the following species:

- Acanthocarpus alexandri Stimpson, 1871
- Acanthocarpus bispinosus A. Milne-Edwards, 1880
- Acanthocarpus brevispinis Monod, 1946
- Acanthocarpus delsolari Garth, 1973
- Acanthocarpus meridionalis Mañé-Garzón, 1979
- †Acanthocarpus obscurus (Rathbun, 1918)
- †Acanthocarpus osborni Feldmann, Schweitzer & Phillips, 2019
