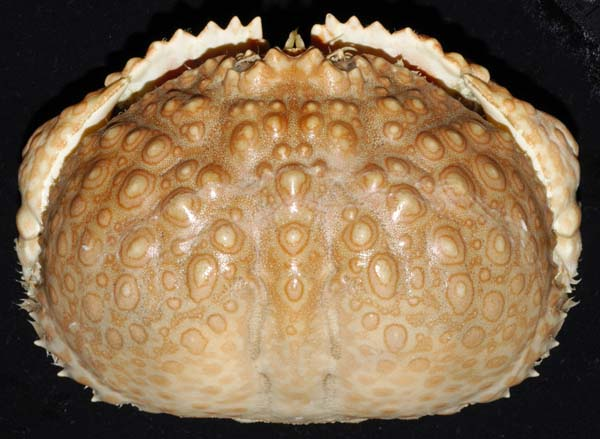
- Calappa japonica seen from above; the front of the animal is at the top of the picture

Scientific classification
- Kingdom: Animalia
- Phylum: Arthropoda
- Clade: Pancrustacea
- Class: Malacostraca
- Order: Decapoda
- Suborder: Pleocyemata
- Infraorder: Brachyura
- Superfamily: Calappoidea
- Family: Calappidae; Milne-Edwards, 1837

= Calappidae =

Calappidae Temporal range: Cretaceous - Recent

Family of crabs

Calappidae is a family of crabs containing the following genera:

- Acanthocarpus Stimpson, 1871
- Calappa Weber, 1795
- †Calappella Rathbun, 1919
- †Calappilia A. Milne-Edwards, 1873
- Calappula Galil, 1997
- †Carinocalappa Beschin, Busulini & Tessier in Beschin, Busulini, Fornaciari, Papazzoni & Tessier, 2018
- Corallomursia De Angeli & Ceccon, 2014
- Cryptosoma Brullé, 1839
- Cycloes De Haan, 1837
- Cyclozodion Williams & Child, 1989
- Mursia A. G. Desmarest, 1823
- †Mursilata C.-H. Hu & Tao, 1996
- †Mursilia Rathbun, 1918
- †Mursiopsis Ristori, 1889
- †Nantocyclois Beschin, Busulini & Tessier, 2013
- †Paracorallomursia Beschin, Busulini, Tessier & Zorzin, 2016
- Paracyclois Miers, 1886
- Platymera H. Milne Edwards, 1837
- †Pseudocorallomursia Beschin, Busulini, Tessier & Zorzin, 2016
- †Stenodromia A. Milne-Edwards, 1873
- †Tavernolesia Artal & Onetti, 2017
- †Tutus Collins in Collins, Portell & Donovan, 2009

Fossils within this family can be found in sediment of Europe, United States, Mexico, Central America, Australia and Japan from Cretaceous to recent (age range: 66.043 to 0.0 Ma).
