= Pebble crab =

Several species of crabs share the name pebble crab:

- Family Xanthidae, various species
- Family Leucosiidae, various species:

- Leucosia anatum (Herbst, 1783)
