= Coleusia janani =

Scientific classification
- Kingdom: Animalia
- Phylum: Arthropoda
- Class: Malacostraca
- Order: Decapoda
- Suborder: Pleocyemata
- Infraorder: Brachyura
- Family: Leucosiidae
- Genus: Coleusia
- Species: C. janani

Binomial name
- Coleusia janani Giraldes, Al-Maslamni & Smyth, 2017

Species of crab

Coleusia janani is a newly discovered species of pebble crabs found off the coast of Qatar in 2017. Its shell is of bright orange and lite grey color with small white centres and lined by thin red outer rings.
