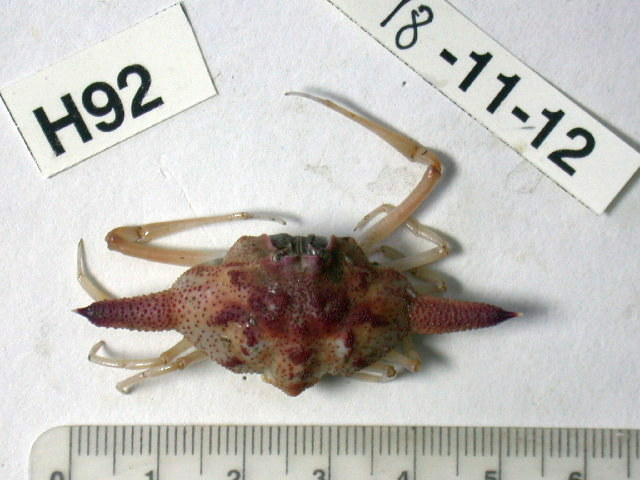

Scientific classification
- Domain: Eukaryota
- Kingdom: Animalia
- Phylum: Arthropoda
- Class: Malacostraca
- Order: Decapoda
- Suborder: Pleocyemata
- Infraorder: Brachyura
- Family: Leucosiidae
- Genus: Ixa
- Species: I. monodi

Binomial name
- Ixa monodi Holthuis & Gottlieb, 1956

= Ixa monodi =

Species of crab

Ixa monodi, the Red Sea pebble crab is a species of pebble crab from the family Leucosiidae which prefers to burrow in sandy, shallow coastal waters. It was first described from the eastern Mediterranean where it is an invasive species having colonised the coasts of the Levantine Sea from the Red Sea by Lessepsian migration from the Red Sea via the Suez Canal.

== Description ==
Ixa monodi has a transversely ovoid carapace which is laterally stretched to form a process on each side which is cylindrical and covered in tubercles. The forehead is forked and the orbits are deep and completely overhang the eyes with three indentations in their outer margins. The posterior margin bears two granulose tubercles. The dorsal surface of the carapace has two longitudinal grooves which fork before the long. thin chelipeds. The carapace is pale reddish-orange in colour with more intensely coloured granules, the lateral processes are paler towards their tips, the chelipeds are orange and the pereopods are paler orange. The largest individual recorded had a carapace length of 59.2 mm.

== Distribution ==
Ixa monodi is native to the Red Sea and was probably originally identified as Ixa cylindrus by Dr. Theodore Monod in 1938 from the Gulf of Suez but it was definitely described in 1956 from specimens collected by Holthuis & Gottlieb off the coast of south-easternTurkey at Mersin Bay in 1955. It has since been recorded from Israel, Syria, Rhodes and Egypt.

== Habitat ==
Ixa monodi occurs on sandy or muddy substrates in shallow waters between 14m and 60m in depth.

== Naming ==
Ixa monodi is named in honour of Dr. Theodore Monod, who was director of the Institut Francais d'Afrique Noire at Dakar, as he was the first scientist to publish an illustration of this species. The specimen collected by Holthuis and Gottlieb in Mersin Bay in 1955 is the holotype of Ixa monodi and has been preserved in the collection of the Rijksmuseum van Natuurlijke Historie in Leiden.
