= Banc Capel =

Guyot, or flat-topped underwater volcano, in the Coral Sea

- Location within Oceania

Location
- Location: Coral Sea, in the South Pacific Ocean, near New Caledonia
- Coordinates: 24°45.70′S 159°42.13′E)
- Country: France

Geology
- Type: Guyot
- Volcanic arc/chain: Lord Howe Seamount Chain

Banc Capel is a guyot, or flat-topped underwater volcano, in the Coral Sea.

== Description ==
Banc Capel is a guyot – a former atoll with steep sides and a flat top – and is swept by strong currents. There are no sandy or muddy substrates, the surface being occupied by rocks or gravel scree.

== Biodiversity ==
Banc Capel is inhabited by species including Nassarius alabasteroides and Laurentaeglyphea. It is dominated by sponges, including the genus Phloedictyon and gorgonians. Other decapods found in the same trawls including the slipper lobster Ibacus brucei, the crab Randallia and swimming crabs.
