= Randallia ornata =

Scientific classification
- Kingdom: Animalia
- Phylum: Arthropoda
- Class: Malacostraca
- Order: Decapoda
- Suborder: Pleocyemata
- Infraorder: Brachyura
- Family: Leucosiidae
- Genus: Randallia
- Species: R. ornata

Binomial name
- Randallia ornata (J. W. Randall, 1840)

Species of crab

Randallia ornata, known generally as the globose sand crab or purple globe crab, is a species of true crab in the family Leucosiidae. It is found in the East Pacific.
