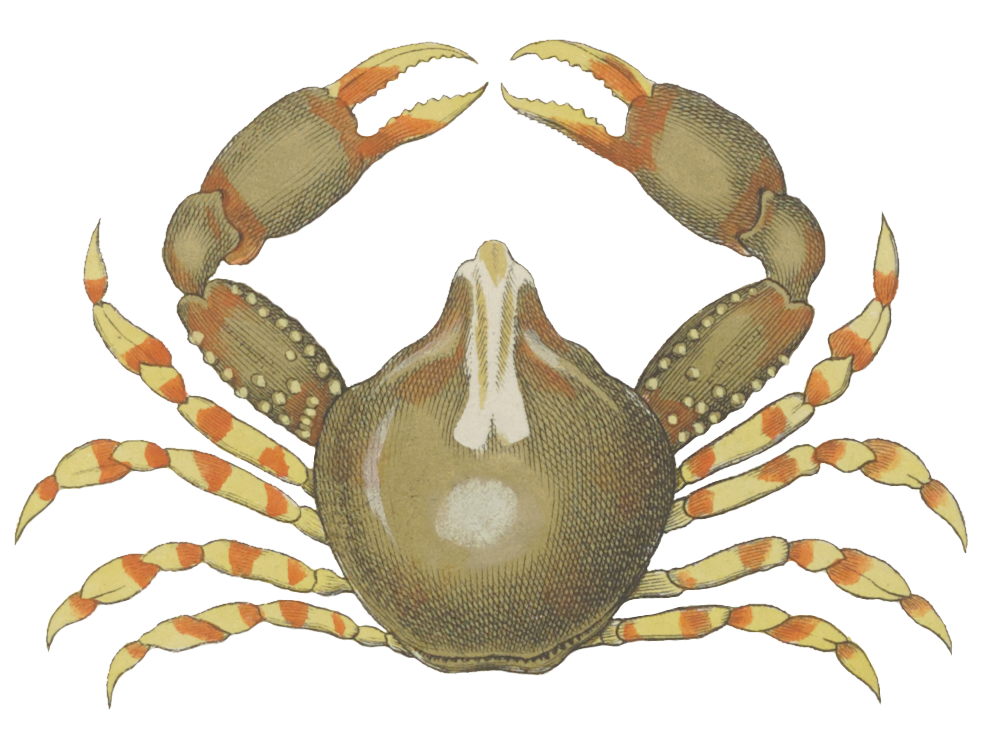
- Coleusia urania

Scientific classification
- Kingdom: Animalia
- Phylum: Arthropoda
- Class: Malacostraca
- Order: Decapoda
- Suborder: Pleocyemata
- Infraorder: Brachyura
- Family: Leucosiidae
- Genus: Coleusia; Galil, 2006

Type species
- Coleusia urania (Herbst, 1801)

= Coleusia =

Genus of crabs

Coleusia is a genus of Indo-Pacific pebble crabs of the family Leucosiidae. The six species currently recognised were formerly classed within the genus Leucosia. They were separated into Coleusia in 2006 based on the fusion of segments 3-5 on the abdomens of the males and the three times axial coiling of the shaft of the first pleopod, which bears a tufted lobe on its distal portion and an elongated apical process.

== Species ==
The following species are currently included in the genus Coleusia:

- Coleusia biannulate (Tyndale-Biscoe & George, 1962)
- Coleusia huilianae Promdam, Nabhitabhata & Galil, 2014
- Coleusia janani Giraldes, Al-Maslamni & Smyth, 2017
- Coleusia magna (Tyndale-Biscoe & George, 1962)
- Coleusia rangita Galil, 2006
- Coleusia signata (Paulson, 1875)
- Coleusia urania (Herbst, 1801)
