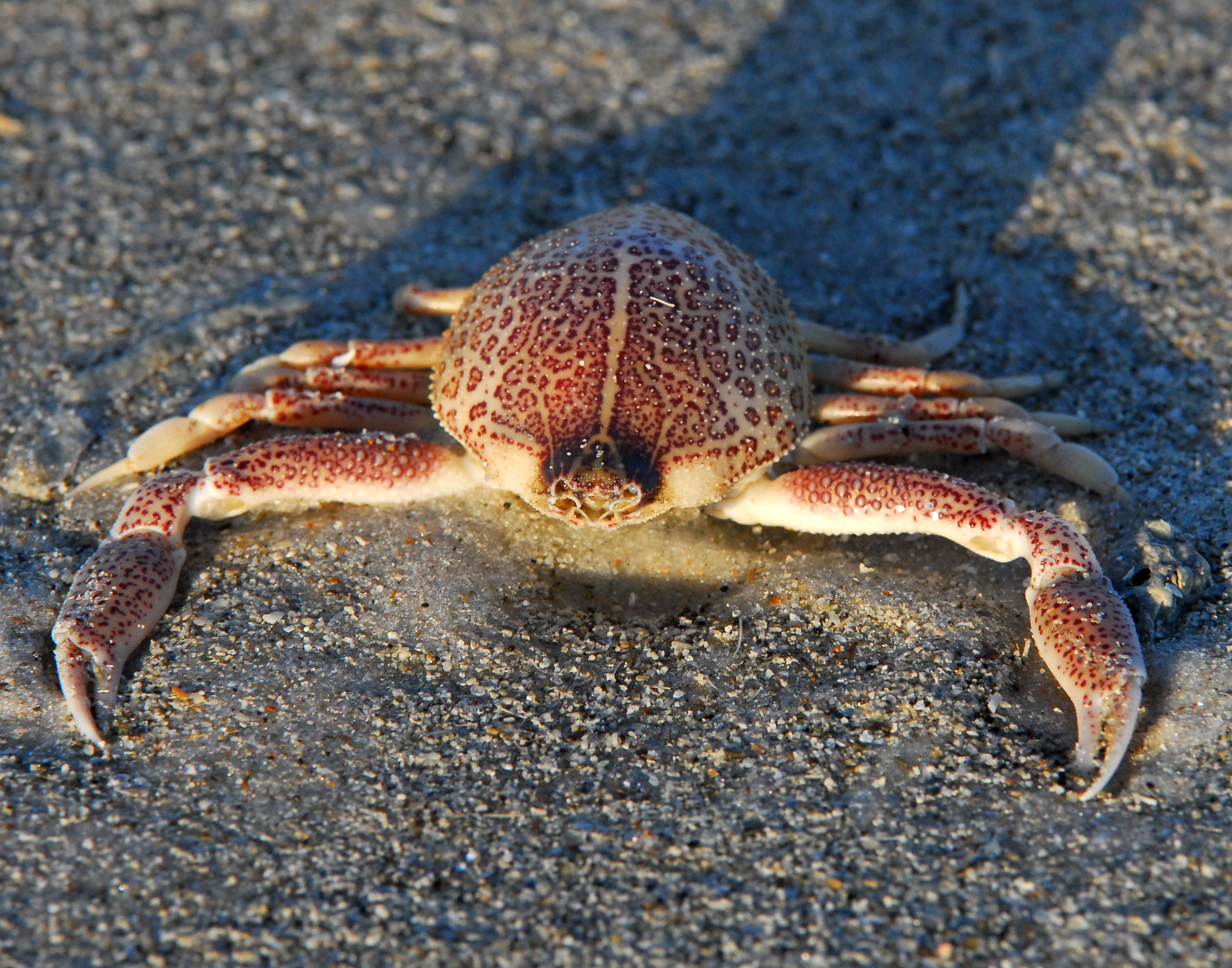

Scientific classification
- Kingdom: Animalia
- Phylum: Arthropoda
- Clade: Pancrustacea
- Class: Malacostraca
- Order: Decapoda
- Suborder: Pleocyemata
- Infraorder: Brachyura
- Family: Leucosiidae
- Genus: Persephona
- Species: P. mediterranea

Binomial name
- Persephona mediterranea (J. F. W. Herbst, 1794)

Synonyms
- Cancer mediterraneus Herbst, 1794

= Persephona mediterranea =

Species of crab

Persephona mediterranea, the mottled purse crab, is a species of true crab in the family Leucosiidae.

== Description ==
Similar to other crabs in the genus Persephona, the mottled purse crab has a fat, round carapace. The anterior end of the carapace is short and squared off with three points. As a purse crab in the family Leucosiidae, the abdomen folding under the carapace forms a deep, purse-like brooding pouch. Persephona spp. can be difficult to identify with morphology alone; however, the coloration of the carapace can be a way to separate the species. The mottled purse crab typically has 7 to 14 larger reddish-brown to light orange or tan splotches, surrounded by a darker line and smaller splotches. These spots are separated by lighter lines, including one running from the anterior to the posterior end.

== Distribution and habitat ==
The mottled purse crab is found across the western Atlantic Ocean, from New Jersey in the United States to Uruguay. This distribution includes the Gulf of Mexico. Within this range, the crab lives in shallow water offshore with sandy substrates.
