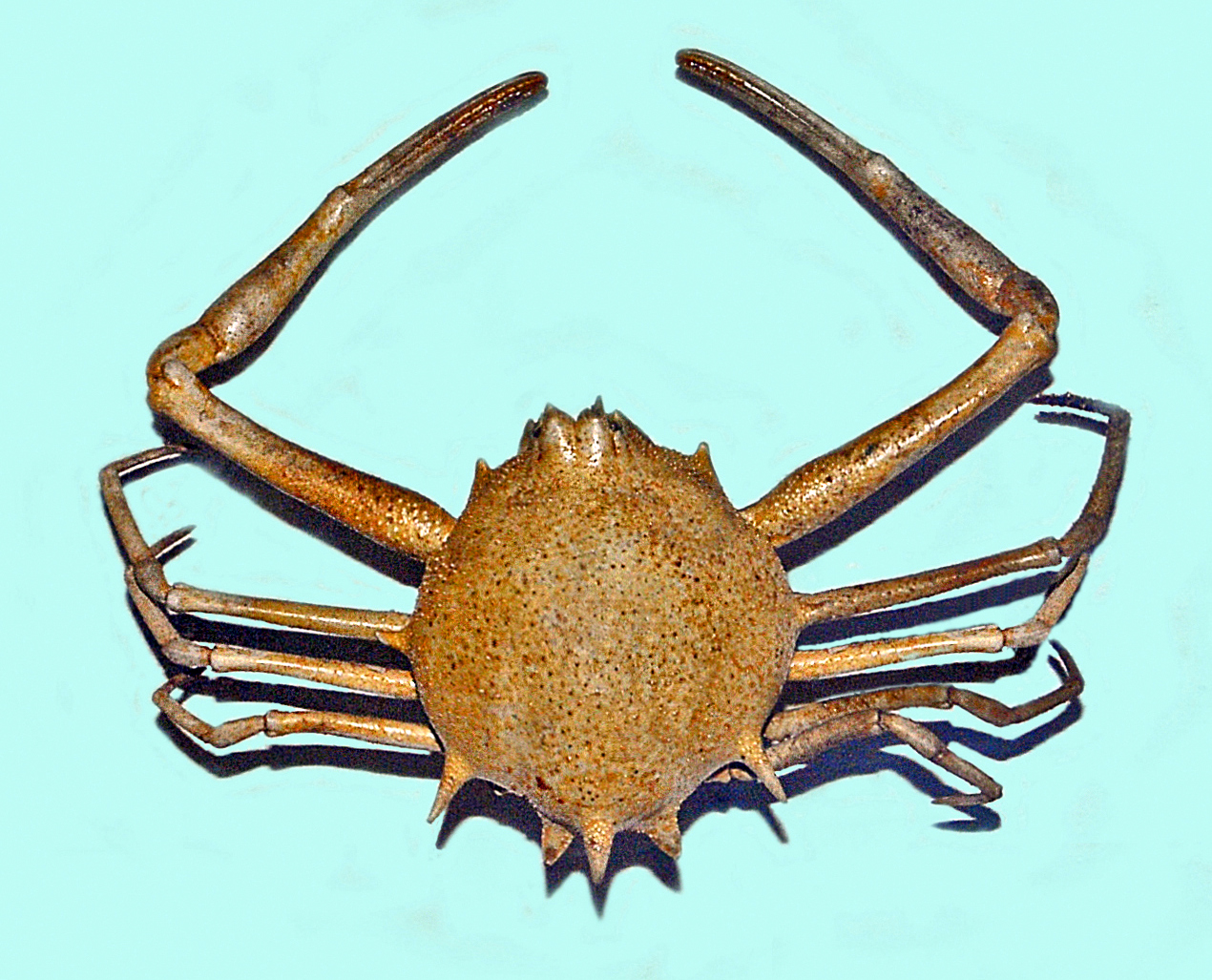
- Myra fugax. Museum specimen

Scientific classification
- Kingdom: Animalia
- Phylum: Arthropoda
- Clade: Pancrustacea
- Class: Malacostraca
- Order: Decapoda
- Suborder: Pleocyemata
- Infraorder: Brachyura
- Family: Leucosiidae
- Genus: Myra
- Species: M. fugax

Binomial name
- Myra fugax (Fabricius, 1798)

Synonyms
- Cancer punctatus Herbst, 1783; Leucosia fugax Fabricius, 1798; Leucosia fugax Weber, 1795; Myra carinata Bell, 1855; Myra carinata White, 1847; Myra longimerus Chen & Türkay, 2001; Myra pentacantha Alcock, 1896

= Myra fugax =

Species of crab

Myra fugax is a species of crab in the family Leucosiidae.

== Description ==
Myra fugax can reach a size of 140 millimetres (5.5 in). Carapace is rounded, globose, with a finely granulate dorsal surface. Chelipeds and legs are long and slender. The color varies from pale pink to pale yellow.

The barnacles of the species Sacculina captiva are parasitic castrators of these crabs.

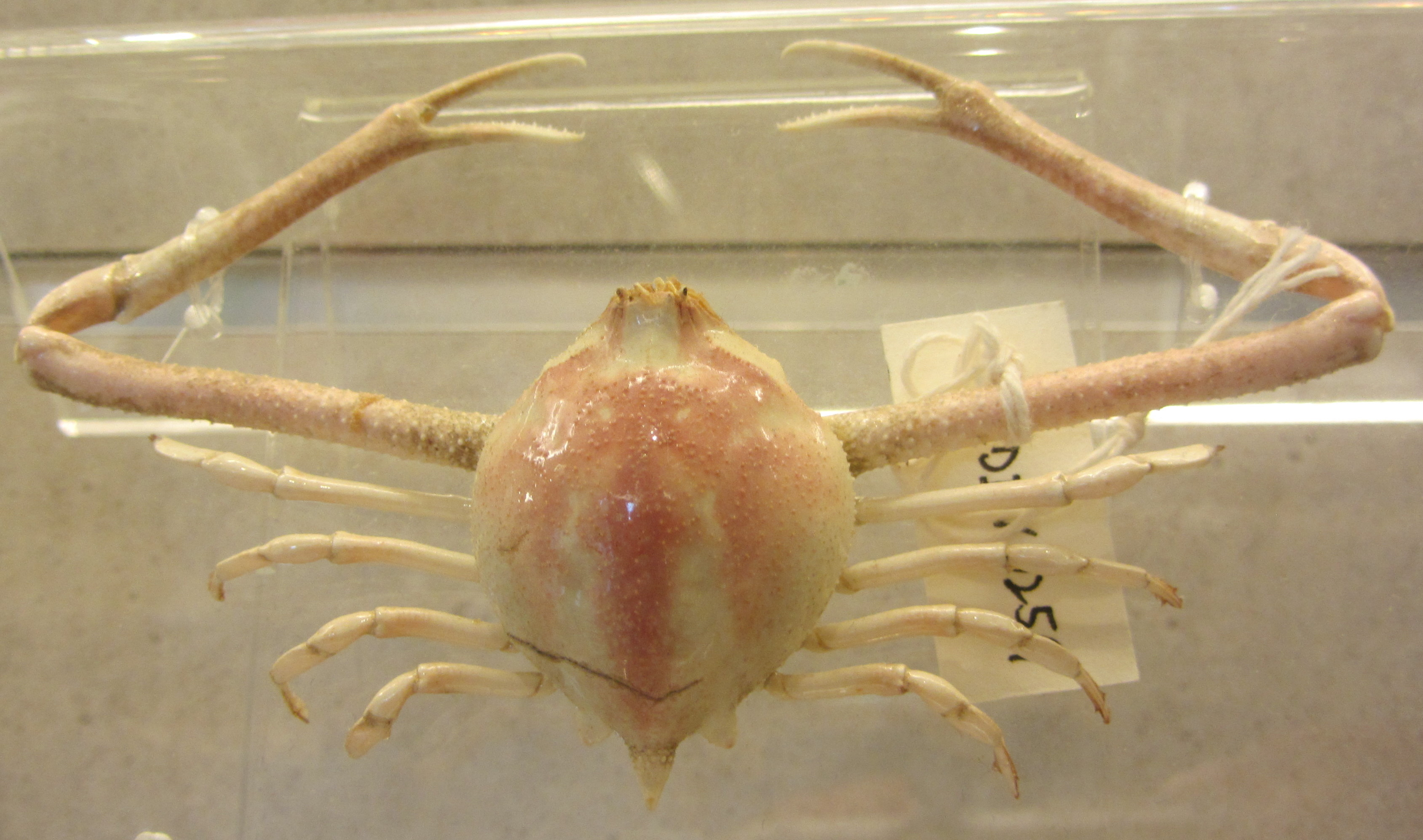
Myra fugax

== Distribution ==
This species is present in the Pacific Ocean, the Mediterranean Sea, the Red Sea and the Indian Ocean. It is common along the coast of New Caledonia, Israel, South Africa, Egypt, Vietnam, Mozambique, Sri Lanka, India, Mauritius and Fiji.

== Habitat ==
This species is typical of sandy substrates, at depths of 9 to 50 m.

== Bibliography ==
- B.S. Galil, A revision of Myra Leach, 1817 (Crustacea: Decapoda: Leucosioidea) (PDF), in Zool. Med, vol. 75, nº 24, Leiden, pp. 409–446, ISSN 0024-0672.
- P. J. F. Davie, Zoological Catalogue of Australia, CSIRO publishing & Australian Biological Resources Study.
- Rupert Riedl, Fauna e flora del Mediterraneo, Franco Muzzio editore, 1983, ISBN 978-88-7413-224-9.
- Türkay, M. (2001). Decapoda, in: Costello, M.J. et al. (Ed.) (2001). European register of marine species: a check-list of the marine species in Europe and a bibliography of guides to their identification. Collection Patrimoines Naturels, 50: pp. 284–292
