= Coleusia signata =

Scientific classification
- Kingdom: Animalia
- Phylum: Arthropoda
- Class: Malacostraca
- Order: Decapoda
- Suborder: Pleocyemata
- Infraorder: Brachyura
- Family: Leucosiidae
- Genus: Coleusia
- Species: C. signata

Binomial name
- Coleusia signata (Paulson, 1875)

Synonyms
- Leucosia fuscomaculata Miers, 1877; Leucosia signata Paulson, 1875

Species of crab

Coleusia signata is a species of crab from the family Leucosiidae which is found in the Red Sea and the western Indian Ocean and which has colonised the eastern Mediterranean Sea by Lessepsian migration through the Suez Canal.
