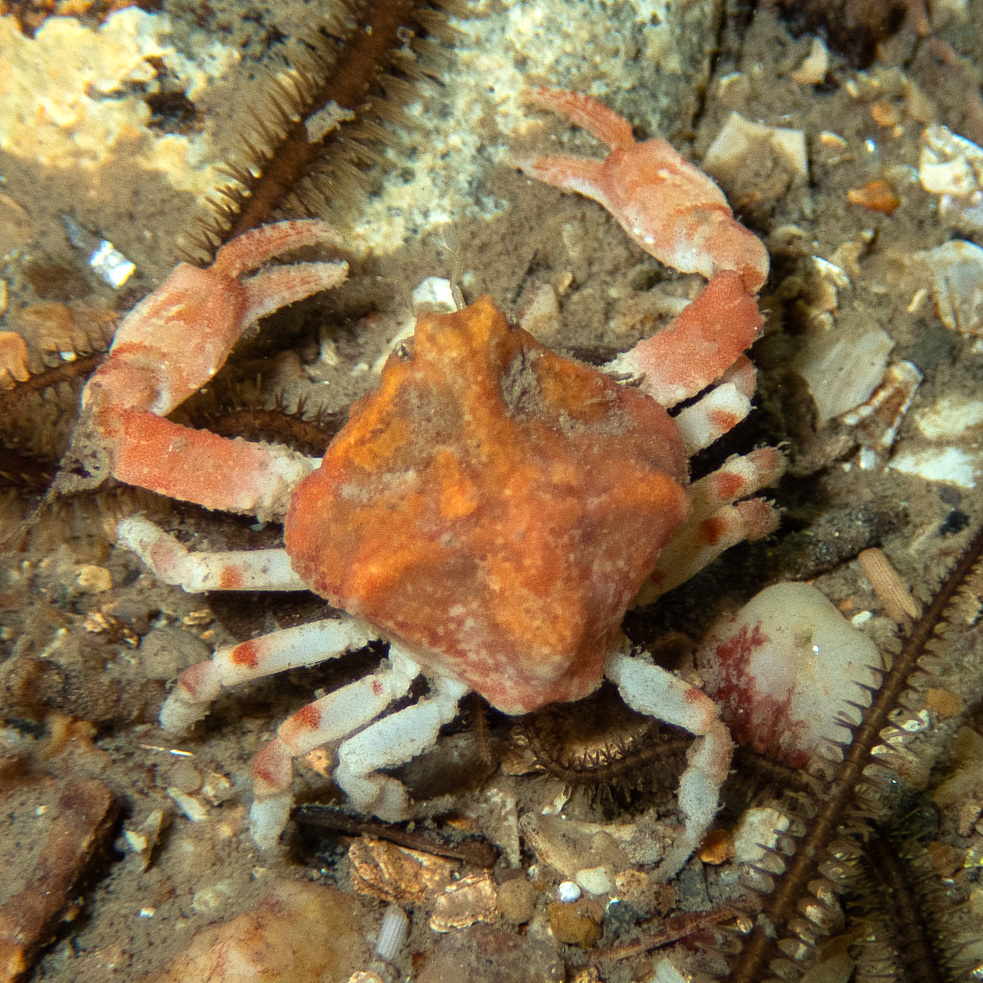

Scientific classification
- Kingdom: Animalia
- Phylum: Arthropoda
- Class: Malacostraca
- Order: Decapoda
- Suborder: Pleocyemata
- Infraorder: Brachyura
- Family: Leucosiidae
- Genus: Ebalia
- Species: E. tuberosa

Binomial name
- Ebalia tuberosa (Pennant, 1777)

Synonyms
- Cancer tuberosa Pennant, 1777; Ebalia Chavesi Bouvier, 1922; Ebalia elegans A Costa, 1840; Ebalia insignis Lucas, 1846; Ebalia maderensis Stimpson, 1858; Ebalia pennantii Leach, 1817

= Ebalia tuberosa =

Species of crab

Ebalia tuberosa, sometimes called Pennant's nut crab, is a species of crab in the family Leucosiidae.

== Distribution ==
This species is found in the eastern Atlantic Ocean.

== Habitat ==
Ebalia tuberosa lives in seawater at depths of 75–132 m (246–433 ft).

== Behaviour ==
Ebalia tuberosa eats small invertebrates, mainly annelids and other crustaceans, as well as organic debris, plant material, and sediment. They feed by probing the topmost layer of sediment with their chelae.
