= Leucosia =

Leucosia may refer to any of the following:

- Leucosia (crab), a genus of crabs
- Leucosia, a possible name for one of the sirens of Greek mythology.
- Leucosia, a former name for Nicosia, Cyprus
- Kira Underwood, a deceased character in Ready Player One whose persona is Leucosia.
- Cyclone Leucosia, a powerful Mediterranean tropical-like cyclone which affected Malta, southern Italy, and Greece in 1982.
- Leucosia, the ancient name of Licosa
