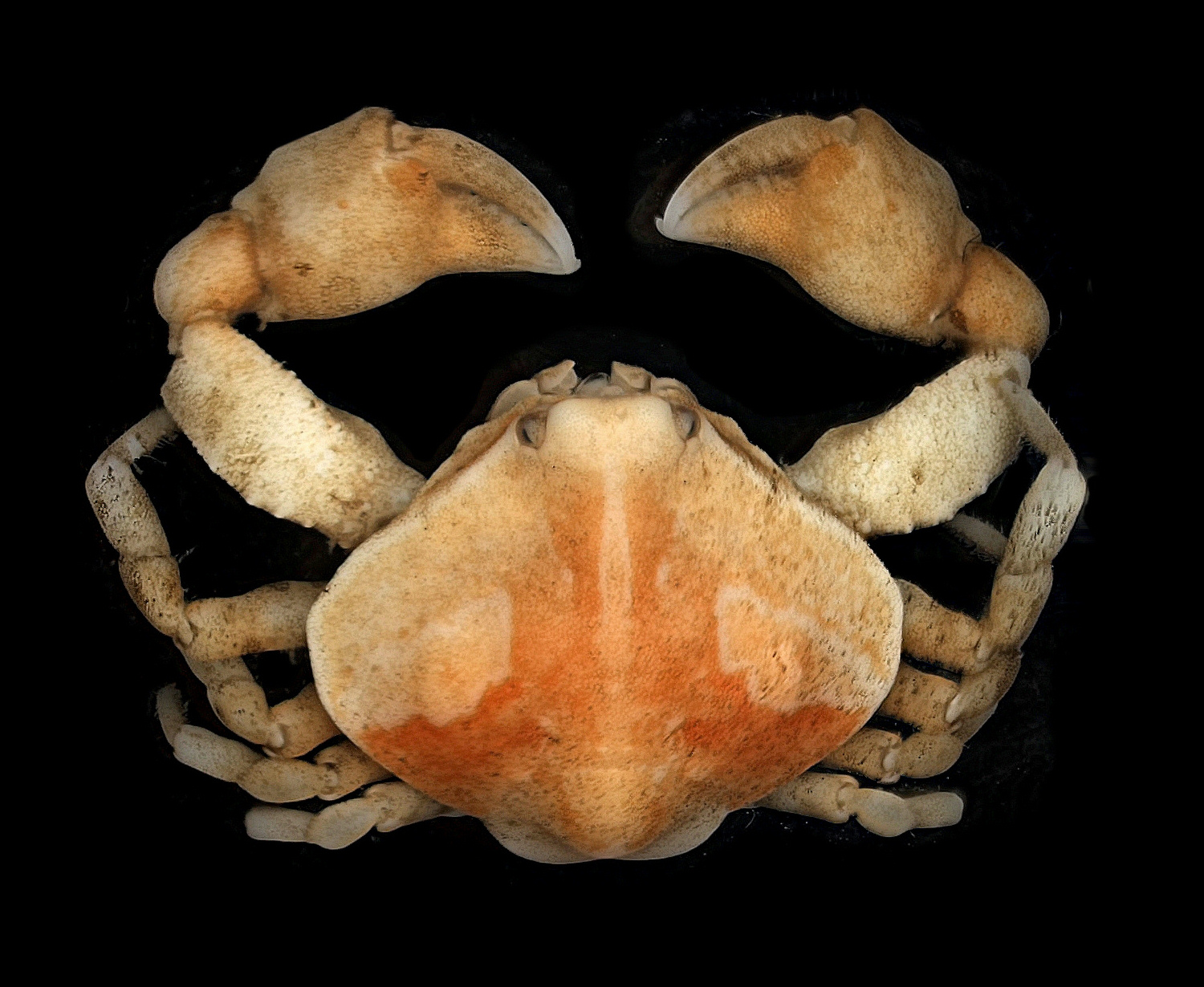
- Ebalia tumefacta

Scientific classification
- Kingdom: Animalia
- Phylum: Arthropoda
- Class: Malacostraca
- Order: Decapoda
- Suborder: Pleocyemata
- Infraorder: Brachyura
- Subsection: Heterotremata
- Superfamily: Leucosioidea; Samouelle, 1819

Families
- Leucosiidae; Iphiculidae

= Leucosioidea =

Superfamily of crabs

Leucosioidea is a superfamily of crabs containing the two families Leucosiidae and Iphiculidae.
