= Lord Howe Seamount Chain =

Seamount chain east of Australia

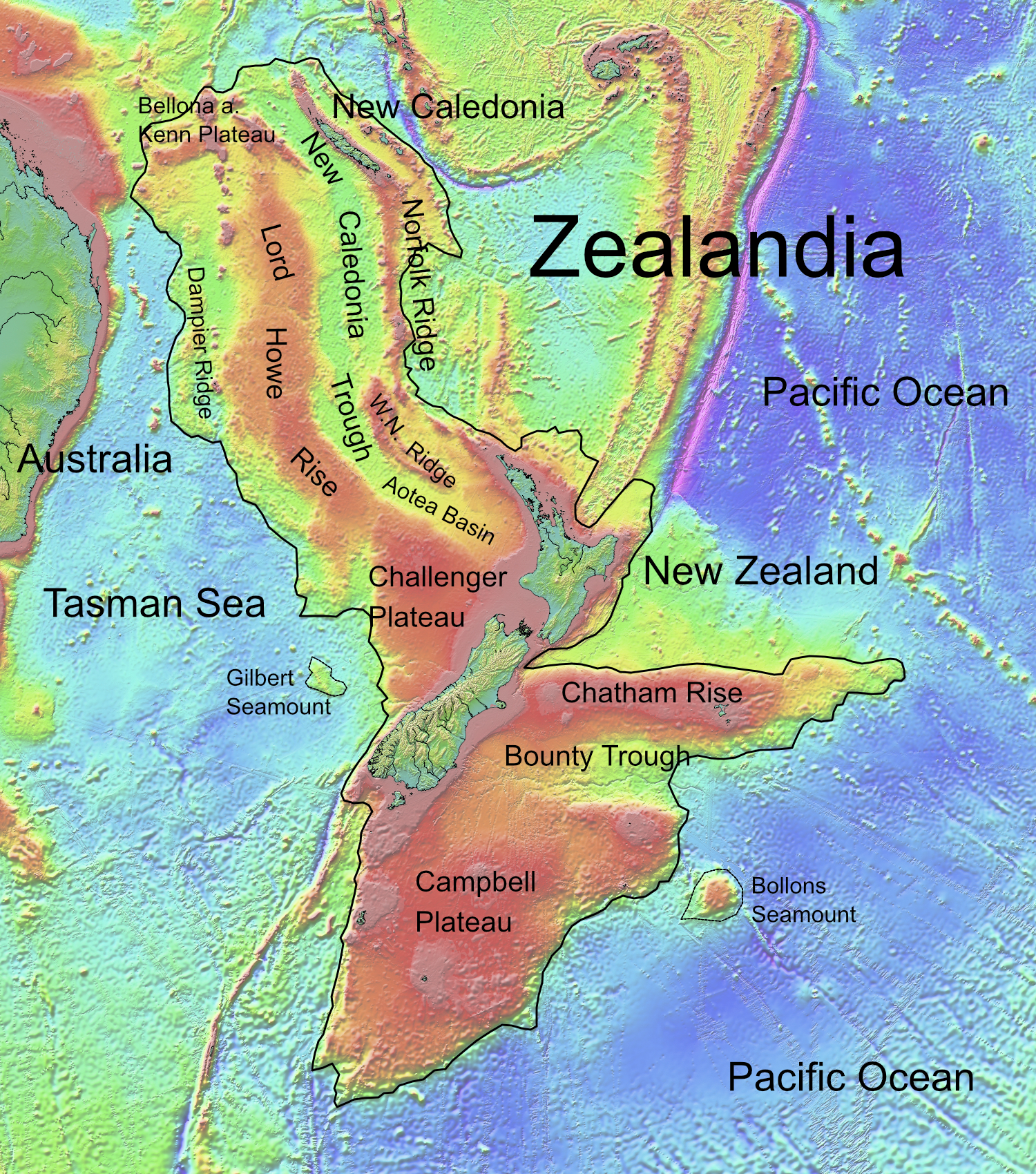
- Topographic map of Zealandia with the Lord Howe Rise to the north west of New Zealand labelled.
- Lord Howe Seamount Chain (yellow are seamounts, red islands)

Location
- Location: Coral and Tasman seas
- Coordinates: 26°22′36.7″S 159°15′37.9″E

Geology
- Type: Seamount chain
- Age of rock: 28–6.4 Ma

The Lord Howe Seamount Chain formed during the Miocene. It features many coral-capped guyots and is one of the two parallel seamount chains alongside the east coast of Australia; the Lord Howe and Tasmantid seamount chains both run north-south through parts of the Coral Sea and Tasman Sea. These chains have longitudes of approximately 159°E and 156°E respectively.

== Geography ==
The Lord Howe Seamount Chain has been known under a variety of different gazetted names, including the Lord Howe Seamounts, Lord Howe Guyots, Lord Howe Rise Guyots and the Middleton Chain.

The Lord Howe Seamount Chain is on the western slope of Lord Howe Rise, a deep-sea elevated plateau which is a submerged part of Zealandia. The Tasmantid and Lord Howe seamount chains are both broadly within the Tasman basin which is the abyssal plain between Lord Howe Rise and the Australian continental shelf. The two chains lie on opposite sides of the Dampier Ridge which is believed to be a submerged continental fragment, that is over 250 million years old, and had split from the Australian plate during Tasman Sea formation. Earlier magnetic studies suggest that the Dampier Ridge is adjunct to the Tasman Sea's former extinct mid oceanic ridge, and it had been postulated to be much younger.

The Lord Howe Seamount Chain extends from north of the Chesterfield group of islands (17°S) to Flinders Seamount (34.7°S). It includes the officially named Nova Bank, Argo and Kelso seamounts, Capel and Gifford guyots, Middleton and Elizabeth reefs, Lord Howe Island and Ball's Pyramid.

=== Geology ===
The Lord Howe and Tasmantid chains each resulted from the Indo-Australian Plate moving northward over a stationary hotspot; historically the hotspot for the Lord Howe chain was expected to presently be beneath Flinders Seamount. but is now thought likely to be somewhat to the south of this, possibly beyond the Heemskerck and Zeehaen seamounts. Indeed the dating of this chain has only been as far south as Lord Howe Island which erupted 6.5 million years ago and there are other gaps in relevant knowledge of this hotspot chain. The chain has now been characterised by compositional analysis to be related at 28 million years to the South Rennell Trough spreading center as its potential initiation point with lessening magma being erupted progressively as the younger seamounts of the hot spot were formed. On the Australian mainland, a third north-south sequence of extinct volcanoes (which includes the Glass House Mountains) is likely to have the same origin. The Lord Howe Seamount Chain includes the following features:

Lord Howe Seamounts
Seamount	Location	Age	Notes
Zeehaen Seamount	36°20′19″S 159°31′15″E		
Heemskerck Seamount	36°16′39″S 159°06′29″E		
Flinders Seamount	34°35′27″S 159°23′38″E		
Ball's Pyramid	31°21′15″S 159°15′06″E		Island.
Lord Howe Island	31°33′15″S 159°05′06″E	6.9 to 6.4 Ma	Island.
Elizabeth Reef	29°34′00″S 159°05′00″E		Coral reef features are above sea level.
Middleton Reef	29°27′00″S 159°07′00″E		Coral reef features are above sea level.
Gifford Guyot	26°40′00″S 159°25′00″E		Dating of seamount top sediments is consistent with expected seamount age progression
Capel Bank	25°00′00″S 159°35′00″E		Dating of seamount top sediments is consistent with expected seamount age progression
Kelso Bank	24°46′00″S 159°30′00″E		
Argo Bank	23°15′S 159°30′E		
Nova Bank	22°11′00″S 159°12′00″E	23 Ma	
Chesterfield Plateau	18°44′11″S 158°34′54″E	28.1 ± 1.0 Ma	
Horsehead Seamount	17°36′05″S 158°44′56″E	27.24 ± 0.24 Ma	
South Rennell Trough		28 Ma	

== See also ==
- Lord Howe Marine Park
- Gifford Marine Park
