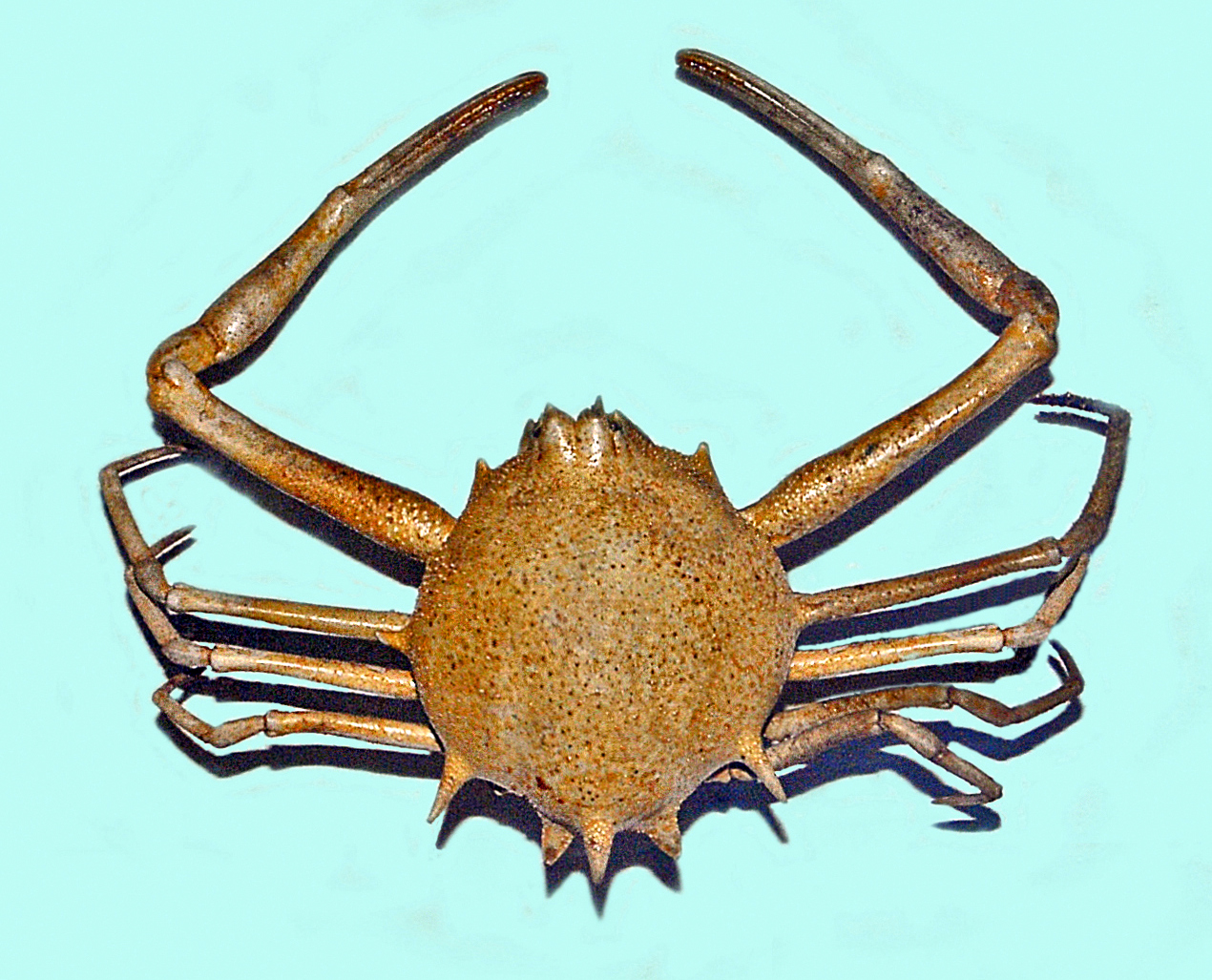
- Myra fugax

Scientific classification
- Kingdom: Animalia
- Phylum: Arthropoda
- Clade: Pancrustacea
- Class: Malacostraca
- Order: Decapoda
- Suborder: Pleocyemata
- Infraorder: Brachyura
- Family: Leucosiidae
- Subfamily: Ebaliinae
- Genus: Myra; Leach, 1817

= Myra (crab) =

Genus of crabs

Myra is a genus of crabs in the family Leucosiidae.

== Species ==
Myra contains the following species:

- Myra affinis Bell, 1855
- Myra amoena Böhm, 1922 †
- Myra arachnoides Böhm, 1922 †
- Myra australis Haswell, 1879
- Myra biconica Ihle, 1918
- Myra brevimana Alcock, 1896
- Myra brevisulcata Morris & Collins, 1991 †
- Myra celeris Galil, 2001
- Myra currax Galil, 2001
- Myra curtimana Galil, 2001
- Myra digitata Galil, 2004
- Myra elegans Bell, 1855
- Myra emarginata Glaessner, 1928 †
- Myra eudactylus (Bell, 1855)
- Myra fijiensis Rathbun, 1934 †
- Myra fugax (Fabricius, 1798)
- Myra grandis Zarenkov, 1990
- Myra gurii Vega, Gholamalian, Hassani, Sajadi & Schaaf, 2012 †
- Myra hainanica Chen & Türkay, 2001
- Myra intermedia Borradaile, 1903
- Myra mammillaris Bell, 1855
- Myra paenitensis Vía, 1941 †
- Myra pernix Galil, 2001
- Myra subcarinata Morris & Collins, 1991 †
- Myra subgranulata Kossmann, 1877
- Myra trispinosa Morris & Collins, 1991 †
- Myra tumidospina Galil, 2001
- Myra wenjii Hu & Tao, 1985 †
