= Gifford Guyot =

Seamount east of Australia

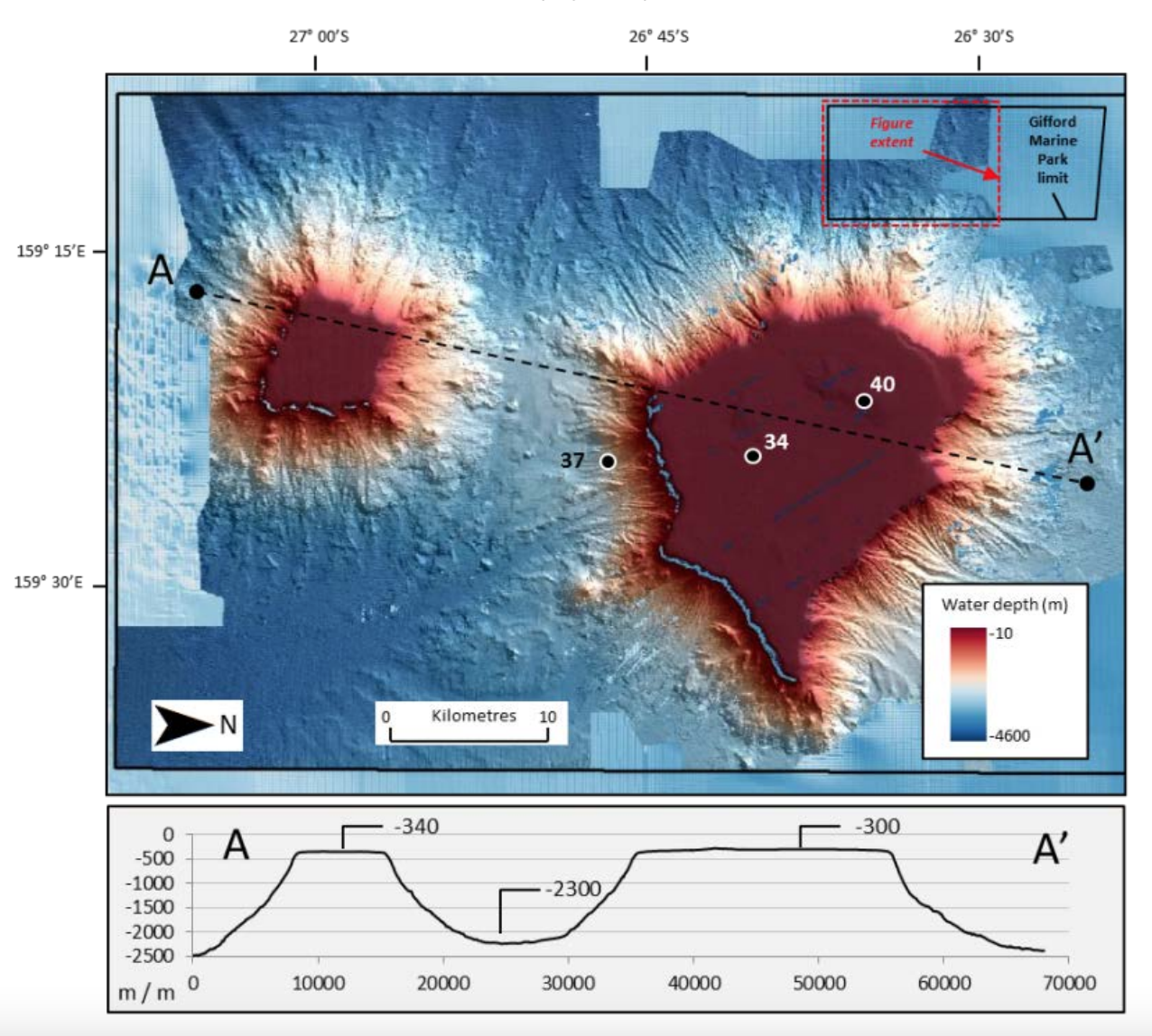
- Gifford Marine Park seabed and profile
- Location of Gifford Guyot

Location
- Location: Coral Sea
- Coordinates: 26.366667°S 159.61667°E

Geology
- Type: Seamount

The Lord Howe Seamount Chain of which Gifford Guyot is an eruptive centre, and part of a pair of coral-capped guyots, formed during the Miocene. The Gifford Marine Park is co-located off the Queensland coast near Brisbane.

Seamounts of the Lord Howe Seamount Chain with Gifford Guyot in deeper red (clicking on the map enables mouse over)

== Geology ==
The Gifford guyots are two flat‐topped basaltic seamounts, now caped with carbonate sediments with the larger Gifford Guyot dated at 15.6 million years ago but the smaller unnamed seamount of unknown age. They both raise from an abyssal plain 3.4 km (2.1 mi) below sea level to generally flat summits that are about 250 m (820 ft) below sea level. This summit plateau is about 55 km^{2} (21 sq mi) for the unnamed guyot), and 350 km^{2} (140 sq mi) in area for Gifford Guyot itself.

== See also ==
- Gifford Marine Park
