= Ixa =

Scientific classification
- Domain: Eukaryota
- Kingdom: Animalia
- Phylum: Arthropoda
- Class: Malacostraca
- Order: Decapoda
- Suborder: Pleocyemata
- Infraorder: Brachyura
- Family: Leucosiidae
- Genus: Ixa; Leach, 1816

Type species
- Cancer cylindrus (Fabricius, 1777)

Genus of crabs

Ixa is a genus of Indo-Pacific pebble crabs from the family Leucosiidae. The genus was erected by William Elford Leach in 1816. One species, the Red Sea pebble crab (Ixa monodi), is a Lessepsian migrant and the species was first described to science from specimens collected on the Mediterranean Sea although the species is native to the Red Sea and had colonised the eastern Mediterranean through the Suez Canal.

== Species ==
The species classified under Ixa are set out below:

- Ixa acuta (Tyndale-Biscoe & George, 1962)
- Ixa cylindrus (Fabricius, 1777)
- Ixa edwardsii (H. Lucas, 1858)
- Ixa holthuisi (Tirmizi, 1970)
- Ixa inermis (Leach, 1817)
- Ixa investigatoris (Chopra, 1933)
- Ixa monodi (Holthuis & Gottlieb, 1956)
- Ixa profundus (Zarenkov, 1994)
- Ixa pulcherrima (Haswell, 1879)
