= Leucisca =

Scientific classification
- Kingdom: Animalia
- Phylum: Arthropoda
- Clade: Pancrustacea
- Class: Malacostraca
- Order: Decapoda
- Suborder: Pleocyemata
- Infraorder: Brachyura
- Family: Leucosiidae
- Subfamily: Cryptocneminae
- Genus: Leucisca; MacLeay, 1838

Type species
- Leucisca squalina MacLeay, 1838

Genus of crabs

Leucisca is a genus of crabs in the family Leucosiidae. The genus is endemic to South Africa.

== Species ==
Species in the genus include:

- Leucisca levigena George & M. Clark, 1976
- Leucisca rubifera (Müller, 1887)
- Leucisca squalina MacLeay, 1838
