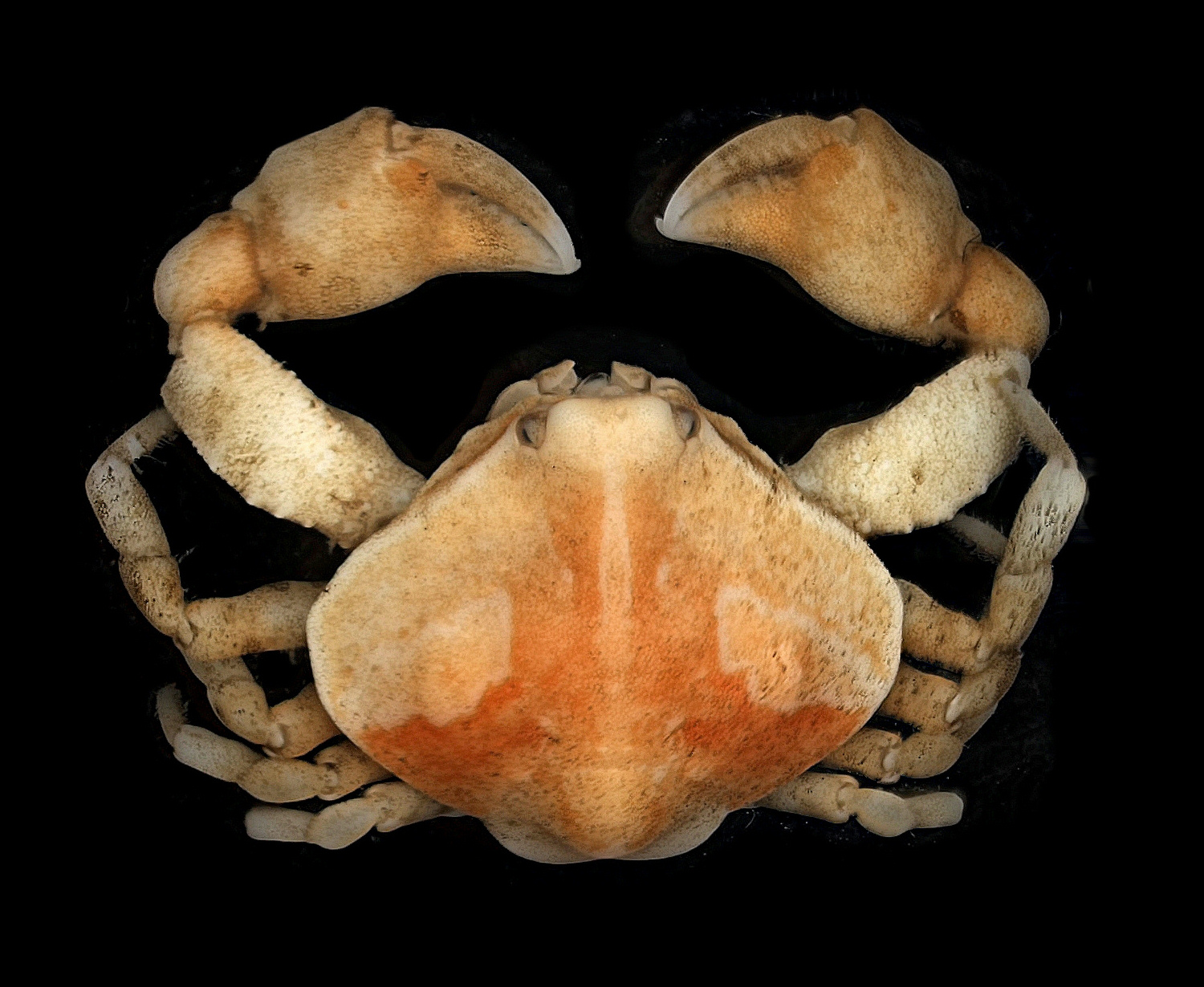
- Ebalia tumefacta

Scientific classification
- Kingdom: Animalia
- Phylum: Arthropoda
- Clade: Pancrustacea
- Class: Malacostraca
- Order: Decapoda
- Suborder: Pleocyemata
- Infraorder: Brachyura
- Family: Leucosiidae
- Genus: Ebalia; Leach, 1817

= Ebalia =

Genus of crabs

Ebalia is a genus of crab in the family Leucosiidae.

- Ebalia abdominalis Nobili, 1906
- Ebalia affinis Miers, 1881
- Ebalia agglomus Barnard, 1955
- Ebalia barnardi Stebbing, 1914
- Ebalia bituberculata Miers, 1879
- Ebalia braminae Ihle, 1918
- Ebalia brevimana Campbell, 1971
- Ebalia cariosa (Stimpson, 1860)
- Ebalia clarionensis Rathbun, 1935
- Ebalia conifera Ortmann, 1892
- Ebalia cranchii Leach, 1817
- Ebalia crassipes (Bell, 1885)
- Ebalia cristata Rathbun, 1898
- Ebalia cryptocnemoides Takeda & Miyake, 1972
- Ebalia dentifrons Miers, 1886
- Ebalia deshayesi Lucas, 1846
- Ebalia diadumena Alcock, 1896
- Ebalia dimorphoides Sakai, 1963
- Ebalia discrepans Costa in Hope, 1851
- Ebalia edwardsii Costa, 1838
- Ebalia erosa (A. Milne Edwards, 1873)
- Ebalia fragifera Miers, 1881
- Ebalia glans (Alcock, 1896)
- Ebalia glomus Stebbing, 1921
- Ebalia granulata (Rüppell, 1830)
- Ebalia granulosa H. Milne Edwards, 1837
- Ebalia hancocki Rathbun, 1933
- Ebalia hayamaensis Sakai, 1963
- Ebalia heterochalaza Kemp, 1918
- Ebalia humilis Takeda, 1977
- Ebalia intermedia Miers, 1886
- Ebalia jordani Rathbun, 1906
- Ebalia lacertosa Nobili, 1906
- Ebalia laevis (Bell, 1885)
- Ebalia lambriformis (Bell, 1885)
- Ebalia longimana Ortmann, 1892
- Ebalia longispinosa Ihle, 1918
- Ebalia magdalenensis Rathbun, 1933
- Ebalia maldivensis Borradaile, 1903
- Ebalia nana Ihle, 1918
- Ebalia nobilii Balss, 1916
- Ebalia nudipes Sakai, 1963
- Ebalia nux A. Milne-Edwards, 1883
- Ebalia orientalis Kossmann, 1877
- Ebalia paratuberculosa Türkay, Chen & Zarenkov in Chen & Sun, 2002
- Ebalia philippinensis Chen, 1989
- Ebalia pondoensis Barnard, 1955
- Ebalia postulans Stebbing, 1910
- Ebalia punctulata Sakai, 1983
- Ebalia quadrata A. Milne-Edwards, 1873
- Ebalia quadridentata Gray, 1831
- Ebalia ramsayi (Haswell, 1880)
- Ebalia rhomboidalis Miers, 1879
- Ebalia rotundata (A. Milne-Edwards, 1880)
- Ebalia sakaii Takeda & Miyake, 1972
- Ebalia salamensis Doflein, 1904
- Ebalia scabriuscula Ortmann, 1892
- Ebalia scandens Stebbing, 1910
- Ebalia sculpta Zarenkov, 1990
- Ebalia serenei Chen, 1989
- Ebalia spinifera Miers, 1886
- Ebalia spinosa A. Milne-Edwards, 1873
- Ebalia stellaris Naruse & Ng, 2006
- Ebalia stimpsoni A. Milne-Edwards, 1880
- Ebalia tosaensis Sakai, 1963
- Ebalia tuberculata Miers, 1881
- Ebalia tuberculosa (A. Milne-Edwards, 1873)
- Ebalia tuberosa (Pennant, 1777)
- Ebalia tumefacta (Montagu, 1808)
- Ebalia woodmasoni Alcock, 1896
- Ebalia yokoyai Sakai, 1965
- Ebalia ypsilon (Ortmann, 1895)
