= Gifford Marine Park =

Australian marine protection area

Coordinates: 26°46′S 159°26′E

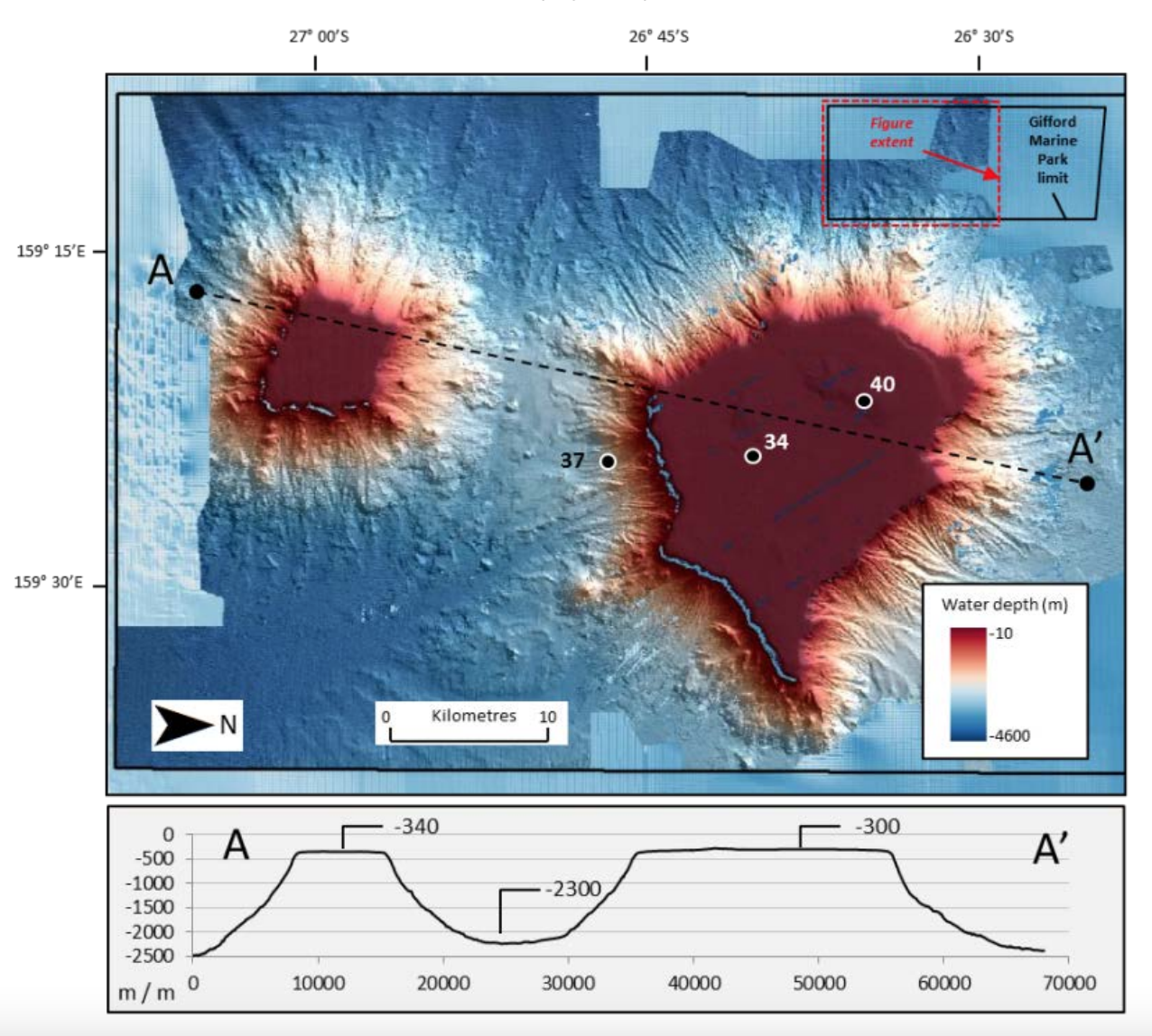
Gifford Marine Park seabed and profile

Gifford Marine Park is an Australian marine park located 700 km (435 mi) east of Brisbane, Queensland. Part of the Temperate East Marine Park Network, it protects 5,828 km^{2} (2,250 sq mi) around two flat-topped seamounts, located in the Lord Howe Seamount Chain.

One of the two seamounts, Gifford Guyot, gives its name to the park. The Gifford Marine Park protects the habitat for humpback and sperm whales who may visit the seamounts for feeding, resting and breeding and also for navigation.

The Gifford Marine Park has been designated a Habitat Protection Zone, IUCN Category IV.

== See also ==
- Australian marine parks

== Gallery ==
Images taken from Nanson et al (2018).

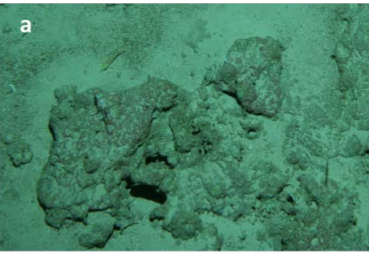
Gorgonians, sponges, and Parapercis fish

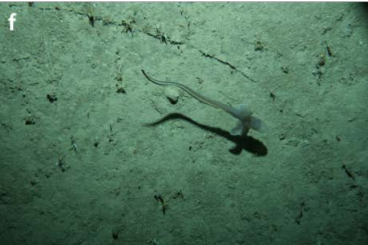
Sediment over consolidated bedform with a Ateleopus sp

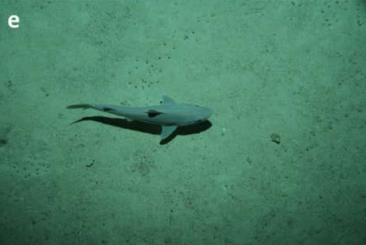
Sediment veneer over consolidated bedform with shark (possibly Squalus griffini)

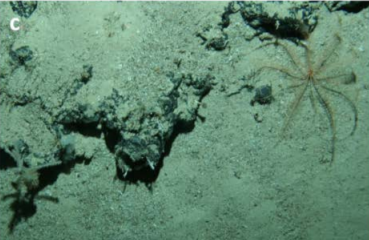
Sediment & calcareous-conglomerate with crinoid

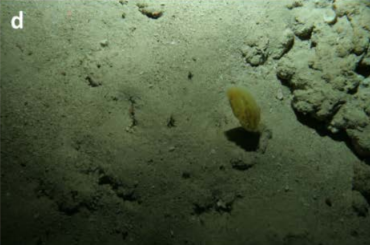
Sediment & limestone outcropping with sea squirt
