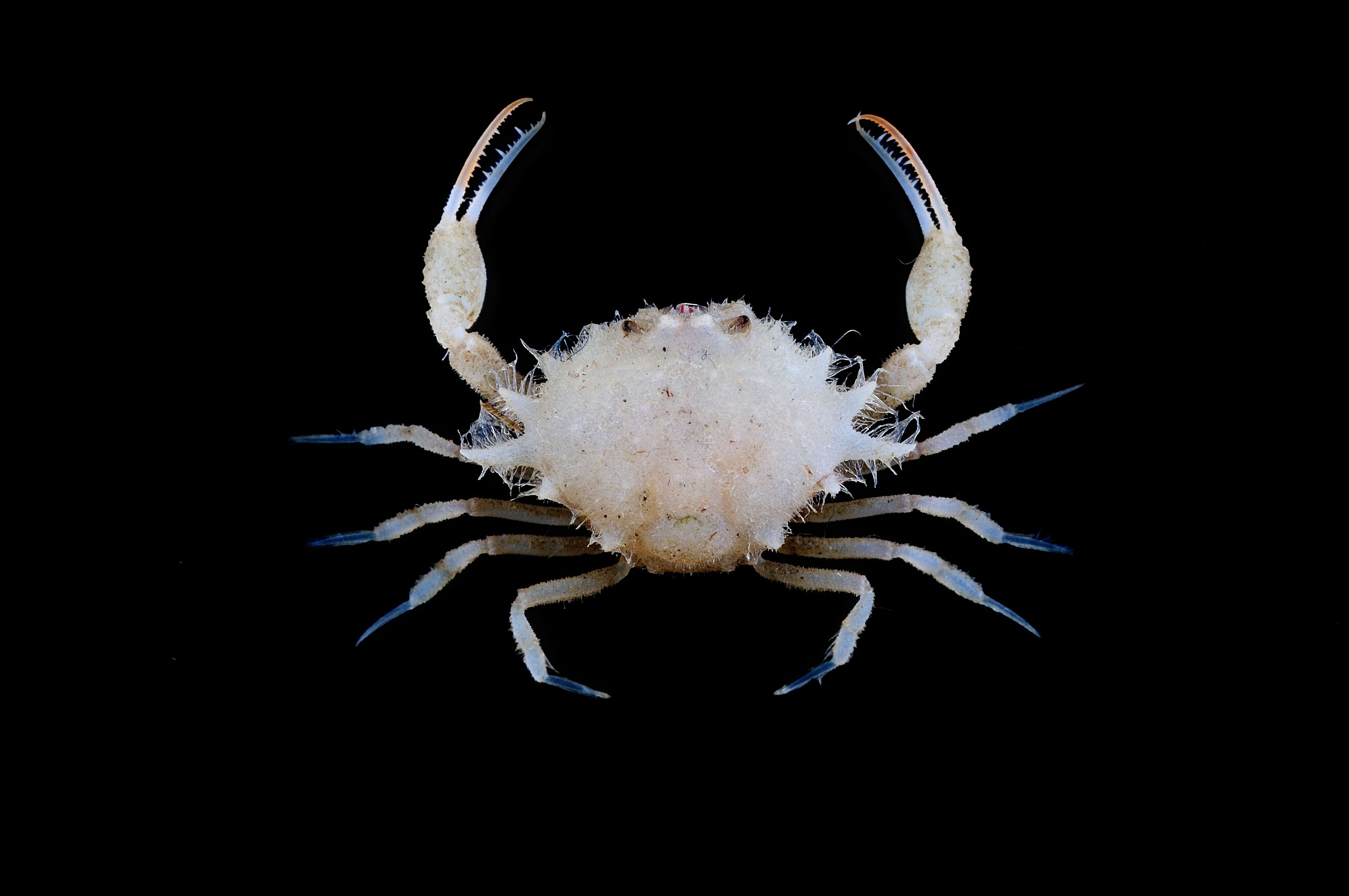
- Iphiculus spongiosus

Scientific classification
- Kingdom: Animalia
- Phylum: Arthropoda
- Class: Malacostraca
- Order: Decapoda
- Suborder: Pleocyemata
- Infraorder: Brachyura
- Superfamily: Leucosioidea
- Family: Iphiculidae

= Iphiculidae =

Family of crabs

Iphiculidae is a family of crabs belonging to the superfamily Leucosioidea.

Genera:

- Iphiculus Adams & White, 1849
- Pariphiculus Alcock, 1896
