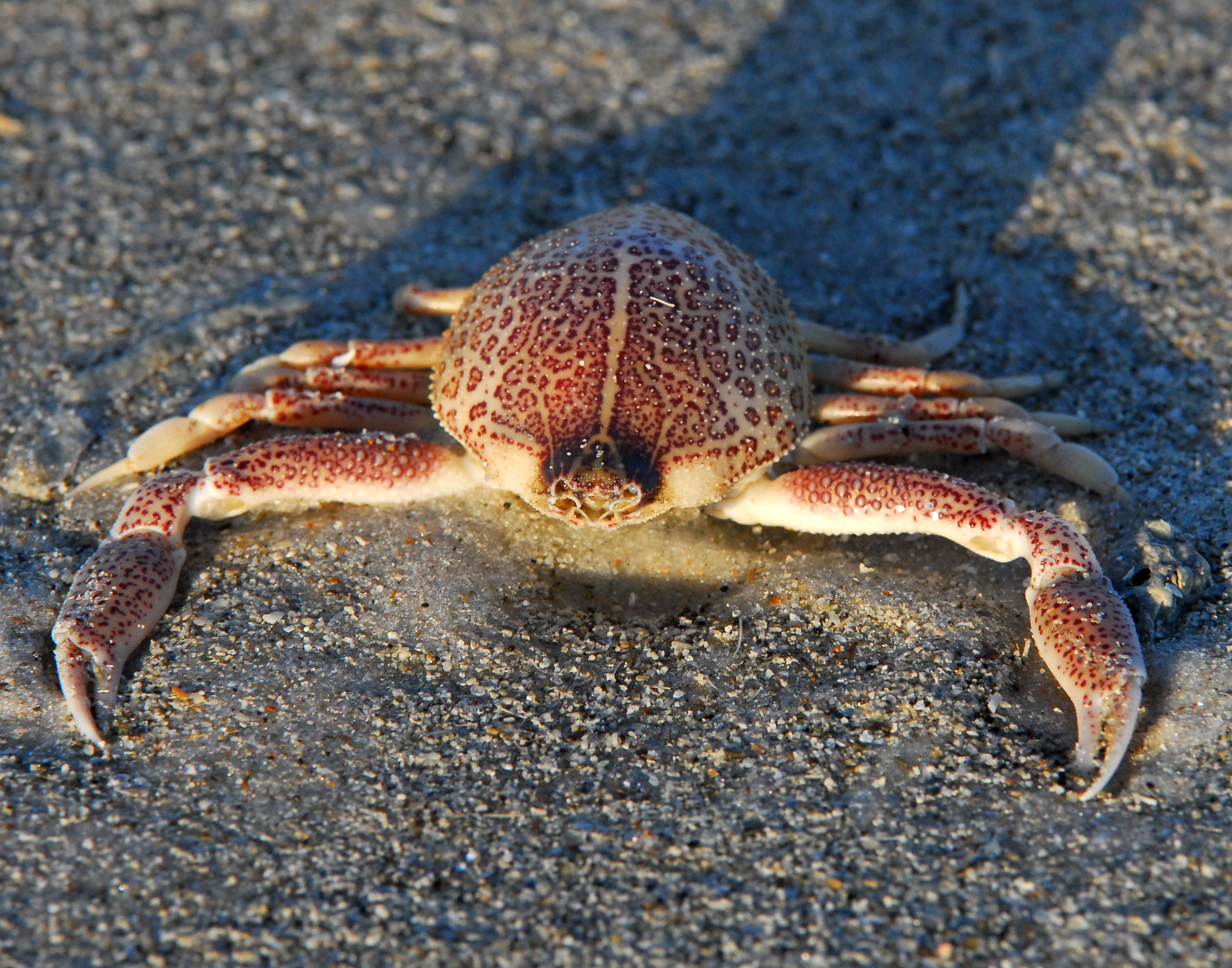
- Persephona mediterranea

Scientific classification
- Kingdom: Animalia
- Phylum: Arthropoda
- Class: Malacostraca
- Order: Decapoda
- Suborder: Pleocyemata
- Infraorder: Brachyura
- Family: Leucosiidae
- Genus: Persephona; Leach, 1817

= Persephona =

Genus of crabs

Persephona is a genus of true crabs in the family Leucosiidae. There are about 5 described species in Persephona.

== Species ==
- Persephona aquilonaris
- Persephona crinita M. J. Rathbun, 1931
- Persephona mediterranea (J. F. W. Herbst, 1794) (mottled purse crab)
- Persephona punctata
- Persephona subovata
