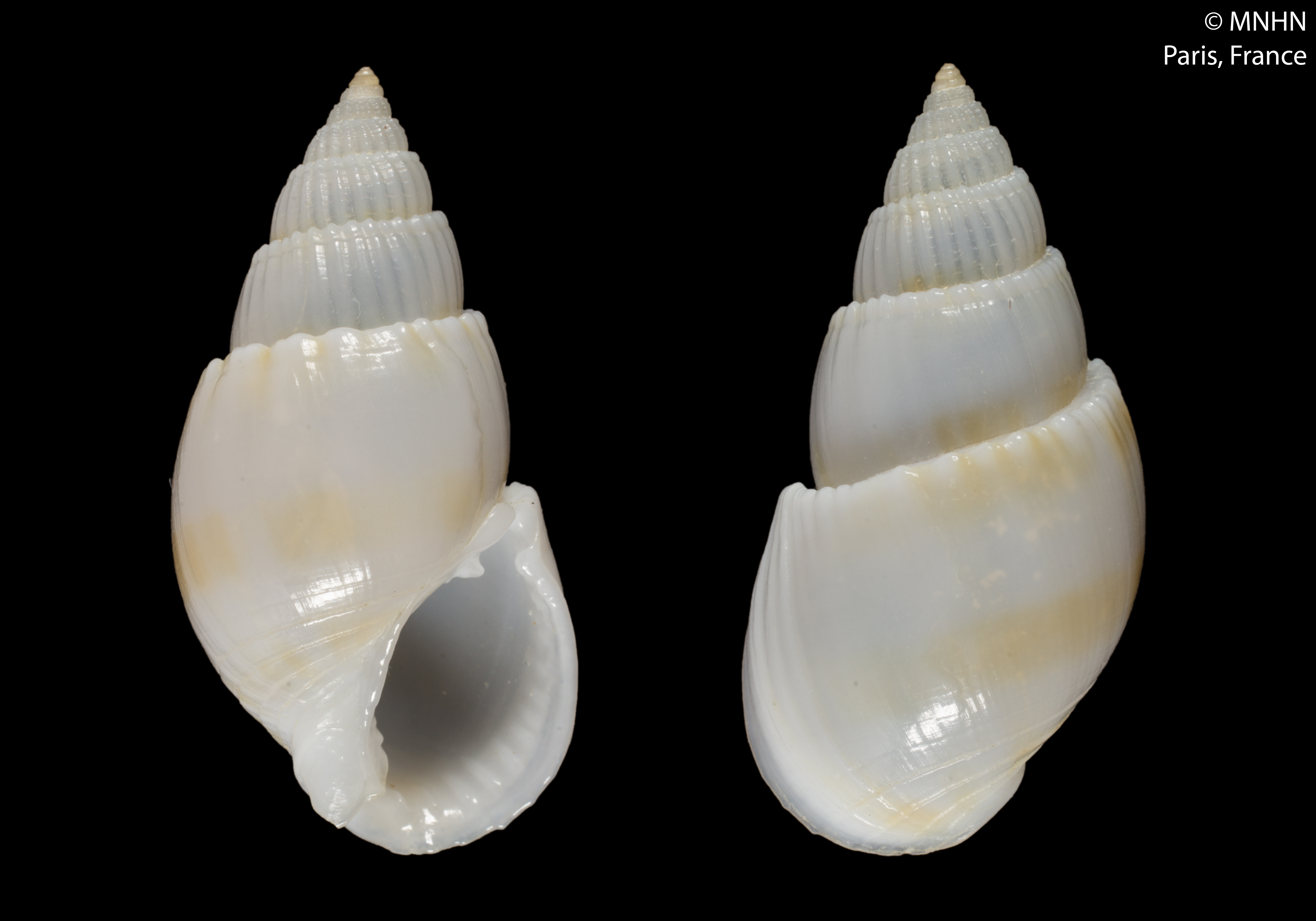
- Shell of Nassarius alabasteroides (holotype at MNHN, Paris)

Scientific classification
- Kingdom: Animalia
- Phylum: Mollusca
- Class: Gastropoda
- Subclass: Caenogastropoda
- Order: Neogastropoda
- Family: Nassariidae
- Genus: Nassarius
- Species: N. alabasteroides

Binomial name
- Nassarius alabasteroides Kool, 2009

= Nassarius alabasteroides =

Species of gastropod

Nassarius alabasteroides is a species of sea snail, a marine gastropod mollusc in the family Nassariidae, the nassa mud snails or dog whelks.

== Description ==
The length of the shell attains 24.7 mm.

== Distribution ==
Nassarius alabasteroides is found in the South Pacific Ocean, on the guyot (or sunken atoll) Banc Capel and in the Coral Sea off the Chesterfield Islands of New Caledonia.
