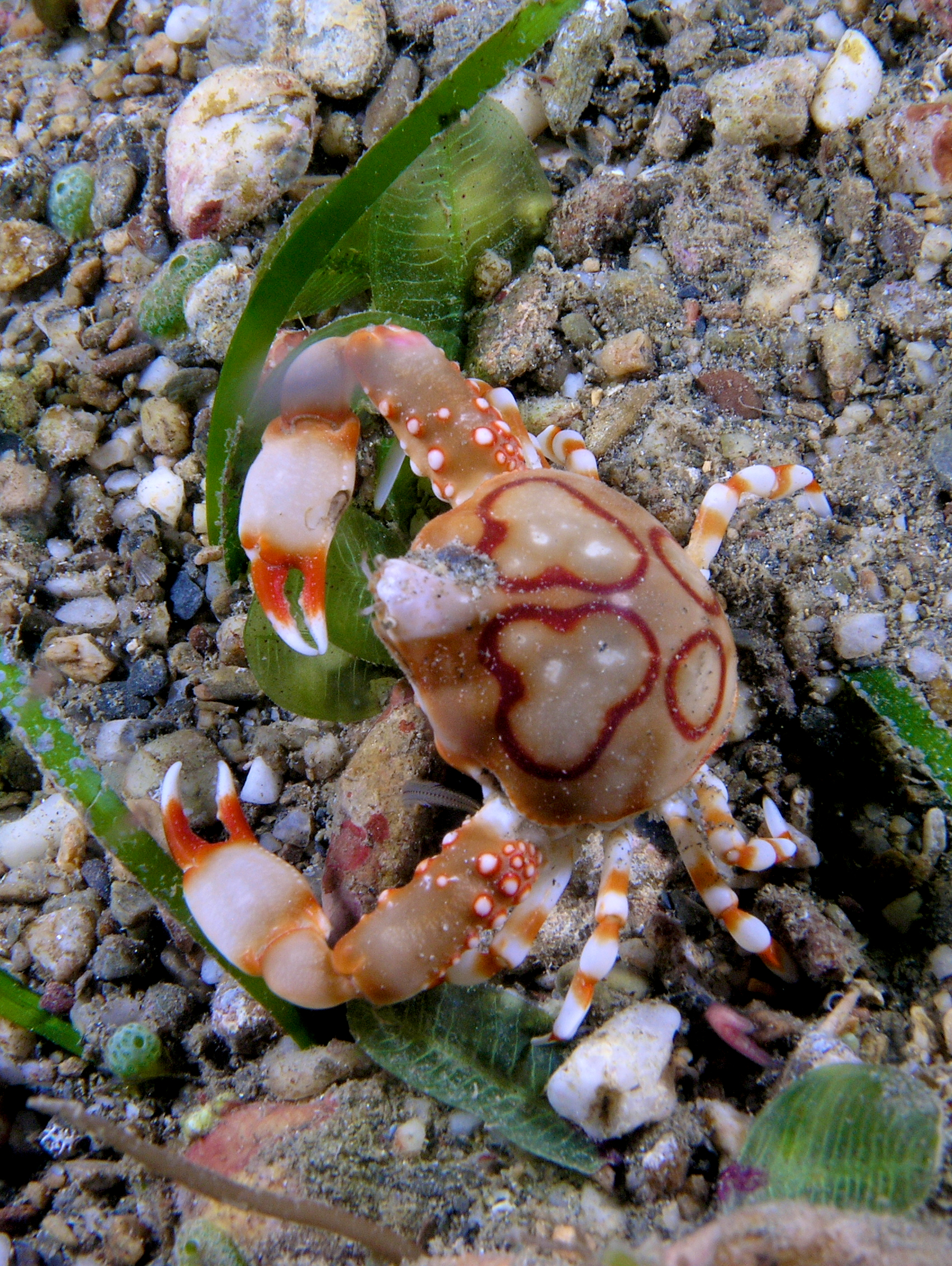

Scientific classification
- Kingdom: Animalia
- Phylum: Arthropoda
- Clade: Pancrustacea
- Class: Malacostraca
- Order: Decapoda
- Suborder: Pleocyemata
- Infraorder: Brachyura
- Family: Leucosiidae
- Genus: Leucosia
- Species: L. anatum

Binomial name
- Leucosia anatum (Herbst, 1783)

= Leucosia anatum =

Species of crab

Leucosia anatum, also known as the pebble crab, is a species of crab in the family Leucosiidae.

== Description ==
This species has a strongly convex, elongate carapace. Its outline is somewhat rhomboidal. The front edge of the carapace is slender and obtusely triangular, with a pointed postorbital that points upward at an oblique angle. It has stout ambulatory legs, with each section being cylindrical and fairly smooth.

== Distribution ==
This species is known to occur in the following locations:

- Madagascar
- Mauritius
- Persian Gulf
- Pakistan
- Sri Lanka
- Andaman Islands
- Mergui Archipelago
- Japan: multiple locations
- Korea
- Taiwan
- China in the sea around Guangdong
- Gulf of Tonkin
- Philippines: south of Manila Bay
- Indonesia: Ambon (type locality)
- Australia: multiple location
- New Caledonia: Ilot Maitre
- Fiji
