= Randallia =

Scientific classification
- Kingdom: Animalia
- Phylum: Arthropoda
- Class: Malacostraca
- Order: Decapoda
- Suborder: Pleocyemata
- Infraorder: Brachyura
- Family: Leucosiidae
- Genus: Randallia; Stimpson, 1857

Genus of crabs

Randallia is a genus of true crabs in the family Leucosiidae. There are about 17 described species in Randallia.

== Species ==
These 17 species belong to the genus Randallia:

- Randallia agaricias Rathbun, 1898
- Randallia americana (Rathbun, 1894)
- Randallia angelica Garth
- Randallia bulligera M. J. Rathbun, 1898
- Randallia curacaoensis Rathbun, 1922
- Randallia distincta M. J. Rathbun, 1893
- Randallia eburnea Alcock 1896
- Randallia gilberti M. J. Rathbun, 1906
- Randallia granulata Miers, 1886
- Randallia jingomao Hu & Tao, 2004
- Randallia laevis (Borradaile, 1916)
- Randallia minuta Rathbun, 1935
- Randallia ornata (J. W. Randall, 1840) (globose sand crab)
- Randallia pleistocenica Rathbun, 1926
- Randallia prolanata Hu & Tao, 1996
- Randallia saitoensis Karasawa, 1993
- Randallia strouhali Bachmayer, 1953
