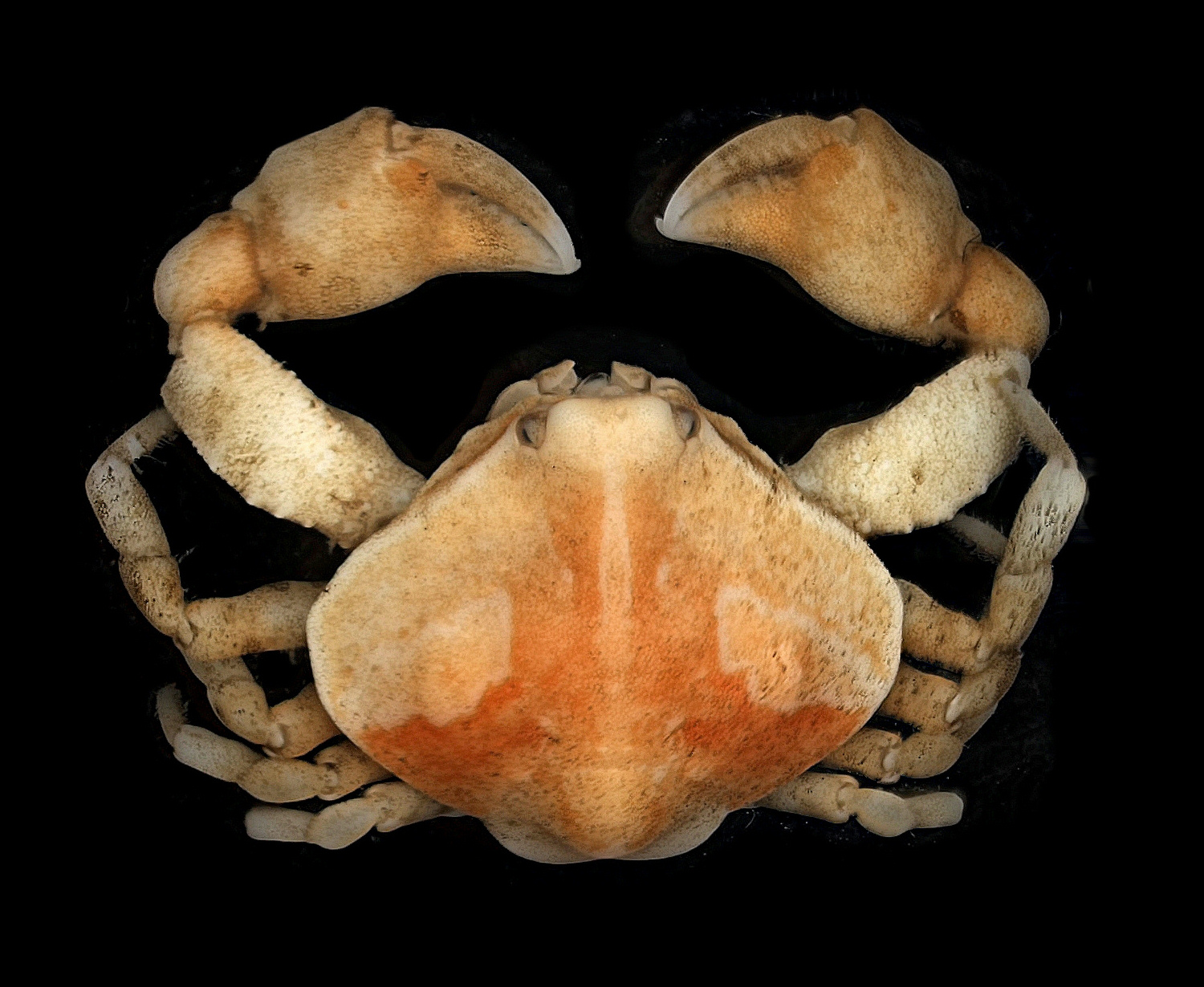

Scientific classification
- Kingdom: Animalia
- Phylum: Arthropoda
- Clade: Pancrustacea
- Class: Malacostraca
- Order: Decapoda
- Suborder: Pleocyemata
- Infraorder: Brachyura
- Family: Leucosiidae
- Genus: Ebalia
- Species: E. tumefacta

Binomial name
- Ebalia tumefacta (Montagu, 1808)

Synonyms
- Cancer tumefacta Montagu, 1808; Ebalia aspera Costa, 1853

= Ebalia tumefacta =

Species of crab

Ebalia tumefacta, sometimes called Bryer's nut crab, is a species of crab in the family Leucosiidae.

== Description ==
Ebalia tumefacta is a small, roughly diamond-shaped crab, with noticeably bulbous branchial regions. The carapace is wider than it is long, and has minute bumps, giving it a somewhat rough texture. It grows to about 12 millimetres (0.47 in) long and 13 mm (0.51 in) wide. The colouration varies greatly. Although some may have a variegated brown and black carapace, it usually ranges from reddish to greyish-white or yellowish-grey. Sometimes it may have red spots, and occasionally may contain an orange margin and a pale pink median band. The shell has a fine, granular texture. The arms are equal in length and the claws are roughly equal in size.

== Distribution ==
This species is found from West Africa to Norway, and is especially common around the British Isles; it does not occur in the Mediterranean Sea.

== Habitat ==
Ebalia tumefacta lives in muddy sand and gravel at depths of 2–15 metres (6 ft 7 in – 49 ft 3 in).
