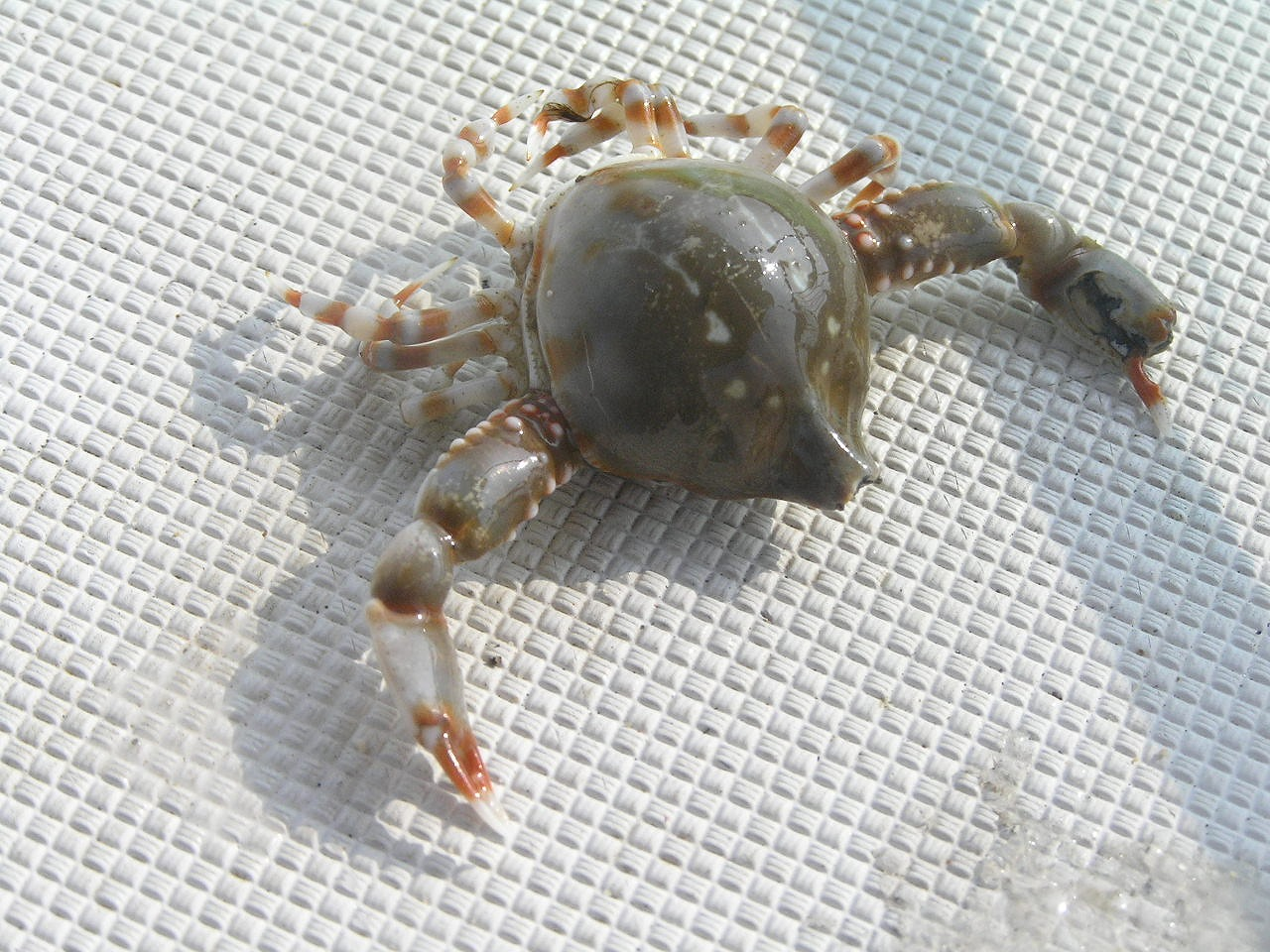
- Leucosia anatum

Scientific classification
- Kingdom: Animalia
- Phylum: Arthropoda
- Clade: Pancrustacea
- Class: Malacostraca
- Order: Decapoda
- Suborder: Pleocyemata
- Infraorder: Brachyura
- Family: Leucosiidae
- Genus: Leucosia; Weber, 1795

Type species
- Cancer craniolaris Linnaeus, 1758

= Leucosia (crab) =

Genus of crabs

Leucosia is a genus of crabs in the family Leucosiidae, containing the following extant species:

- Leucosia affinis Bell, 1855
- Leucosia anatum (Herbst, 1783)
- Leucosia brevimana Bell, 1855
- Leucosia brevior Ortmann, 1892
- Leucosia compressa Shen & Chen, 1978
- Leucosia corallicola Alcock, 1896
- Leucosia craniolaris (Linnaeus, 1758)
- Leucosia formosensis Sakai, 1937
- Leucosia haswelli Miers, 1886
- Leucosia jecusculum (Rathbun, 1911)
- Leucosia laevimana Miers, 1884
- Leucosia leslii Haswell, 1879
- Leucosia longibrachia Shen & Chen, 1978
- Leucosia longimaculata Chen & Fang, 1991
- Leucosia margaritacea Bell, 1855
- Leucosia moresbiensis Haswell, 1880
- Leucosia ocellata Bell, 1855
- Leucosia pacifica Poeppig, 1836
- Leucosia phyllocheira White, 1847
- Leucosia pulcherrima Miers, 1877
- Leucosia punctata Bell, 1855
- Leucosia reticulata Miers, 1877
- Leucosia rubripalma Galil, 2003
- Leucosia sima Alcock, 1896
- Leucosia tetraodon Bouvier, 1914
- Leucosia whitmeei Miers, 1875
