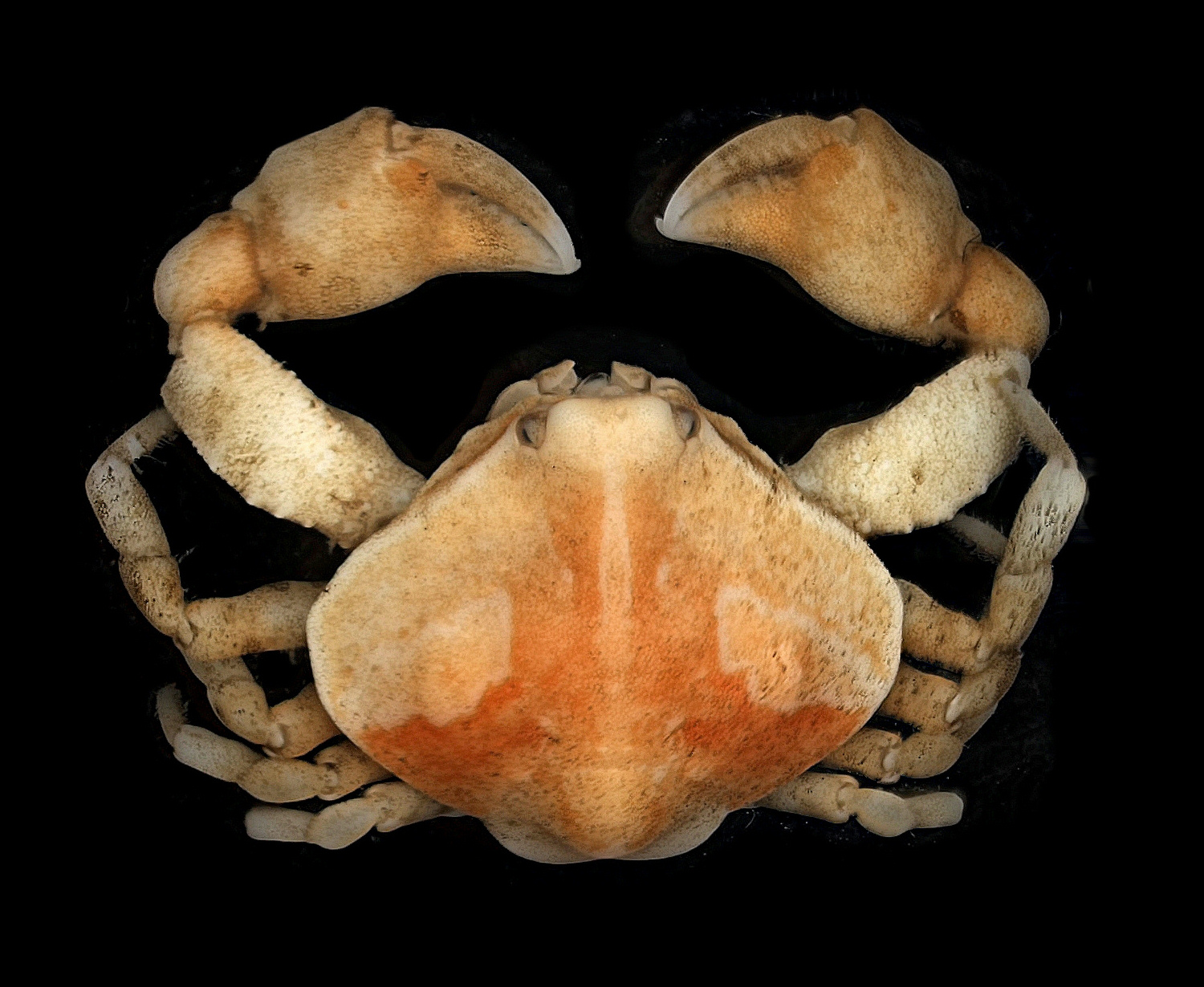
- Ebalia tumefacta

Scientific classification
- Kingdom: Animalia
- Phylum: Arthropoda
- Clade: Pancrustacea
- Class: Malacostraca
- Order: Decapoda
- Suborder: Pleocyemata
- Infraorder: Brachyura
- Superfamily: Leucosioidea
- Family: Leucosiidae; Samouelle, 1819

Subfamilies
- Cryptocnemidae Stimpson, 1907; Ebaliinae Stimpson, 1871; Leucosiinae Samouelle, 1819

= Leucosiidae =

Family of crabs

Leucosiidae is a family of crabs containing three subfamilies and a number of genera incertae sedis:

Cryptocneminae Stimpson, 1907

- Cryptocnemus Stimpson, 1858
- Leucisca MacLeay, 1838
- Lissomorpha Ward, 1933
- Onychomorpha Stimpson, 1858

Ebaliinae Stimpson, 1871

- Acanthilia Galil, 2000
- Afrophila Galil, 2009
- Alox C. G. S. Tan & Ng, 1995
- Ancylodactyla Galil, 2004
- Arcania Leach, 1817
- Atlantolocia Galil, 2009
- Atlantophila Galil, 2009
- Atlantotlos Doflein, 1904
- Bellidilia Kinahan, 1856
- Callidactylus Stimpson, 1871
- Cateios C. G. S. Tan & Ng, 1993
- Coralliocryptus Komai & Ng, 2012
- Dolos C. G. S. Tan & Richer de Forges, 1993
- Ebalia Leach, 1817
- Ebaliopsis Ihle, 1918
- Favus Lanchester, 1900
- Galilia Ng & Richer de Forges, 2007
- Heterolithadia Alcock, 1896
- Heteronucia Alcock, 1896
- Hiplyra Galil, 2009
- Ihleus Ovaere, 1989
- Ilia Leach, 1817
- Iliacantha Stimpson, 1871
- Ixa Leach, 1817
- Kabutos Komatsu & Ng, 2011
- Leucosilia Bell, 1855
- Lithadia Bell, 1855
- Lyphira Galil, 2009
- Merocryptoides T. Sakai, 1963
- Merocryptus A. Milne-Edwards, 1873
- Myra Leach, 1817
- Myrine Galil, 2001
- Myropsis Stimpson, 1871
- Nobiliela Komatsu & Takeda, 2003
- Nucia Dana, 1852
- Nuciops Serène & Soh, 1976
- Nursia Leach, 1817
- Nursilia Bell, 1855
- Oreophorus Rüppell, 1830
- Oreotlos Ihle, 1918
- Orientotlos T. Sakai, 1980
- Paranursia Serène & Soh, 1976
- Parilia Wood-Mason & Alcock, 1891
- Persephona Leach, 1817
- Philyra Leach, 1817
- Praebebalia Rathbun, 1911
- Praosia C. G. S. Tan & Ng, 1993
- Pseudomyra Capart, 1951
- Pseudophilyra Miers, 1879
- Pyrhila Galil, 2009
- Randallia Stimpson, 1857
- Raylilia Galil, 2001
- Ryphila Galil, 2009
- Speloeophoroides Melo & Torres, 1998
- Speleophorus A. Milne-Edwards, 1865
- Tanaoa Galil, 2003
- Tlos Adams & White, 1849
- Tokoyo Galil, 2003
- Toru Galil, 2003
- Uhlias Stimpson, 1871
- Urashima Galil, 2003

Leucosiinae Samouelle, 1819

- Coleusia Galil, 2006
- Euclosia Galil, 2003
- Leucosia Weber, 1795
- Seulocia Galil, 2005
- Soceulia Galil, 2006
- Urnalana Galil, 2005

incertae sedis

- † Ampliura Morris & Collins, 1991
- † Andorina Lőrenthey, 1901
- † Duncanitrix Schweitzer, Dworschak & Martin, 2011
- † Gemmacarcinus Müller & Collins, 1991
- † Hepatinulus Ristori, 1886
- † Nucilobus Morris & Collins, 1991
- † Palaeomyra A. Milne-Edwards in Sismonda, 1861
- † Pterocarcinus Blow, 2003
- † Typilobus Stoliczka, 1871
