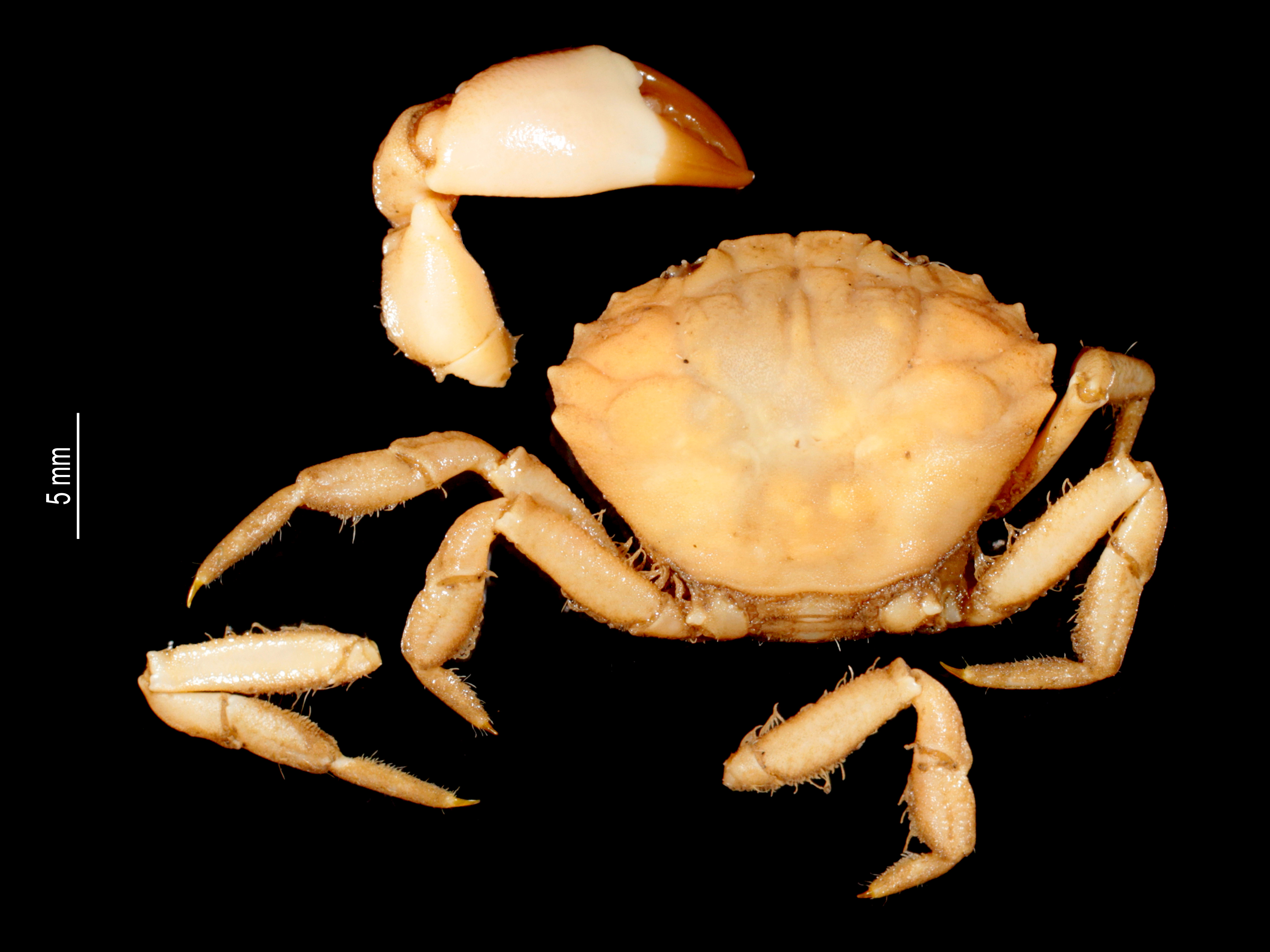
- Paraxanthodes polynesiensis

Scientific classification
- Kingdom: Animalia
- Phylum: Arthropoda
- Class: Malacostraca
- Order: Decapoda
- Suborder: Pleocyemata
- Infraorder: Brachyura
- Family: Xanthidae
- Subfamily: Euxanthinae
- Genus: Paraxanthodes; Guinot, 1968

= Paraxanthodes =

Genus of crabs

Paraxanthodes is a genus of crabs in the family Xanthidae, containing the following species:

- Paraxanthodes cumatodes (McGilchrist, 1905)
- Paraxanthodes obtusidens (Sakai, 1965)
- Paraxanthodes polynesiensis Davie, 1992
