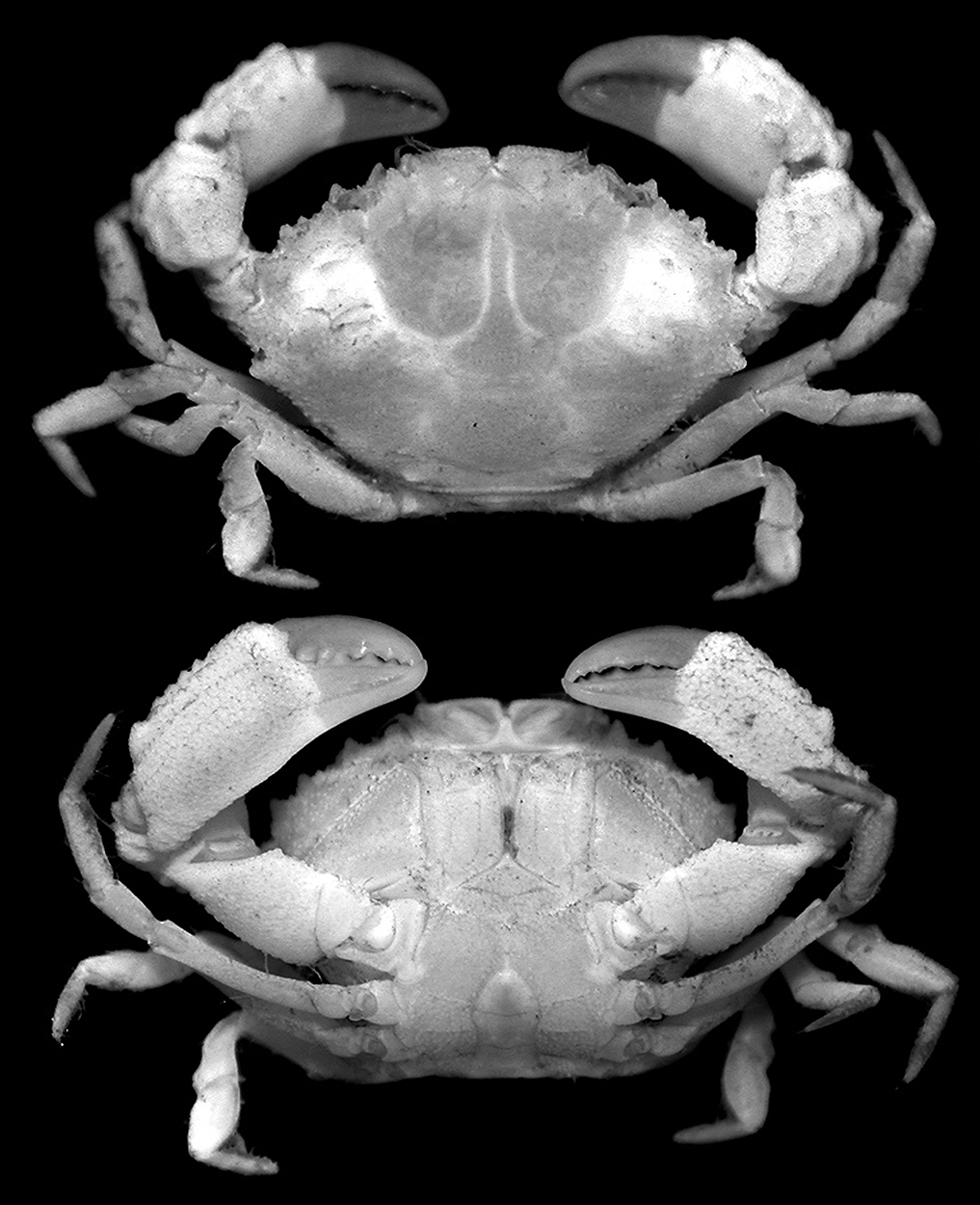

Scientific classification
- Domain: Eukaryota
- Kingdom: Animalia
- Phylum: Arthropoda
- Class: Malacostraca
- Order: Decapoda
- Suborder: Pleocyemata
- Infraorder: Brachyura
- Family: Xanthidae
- Genus: Paraxanthodes
- Species: P. cumatodes

Binomial name
- Paraxanthodes cumatodes (MacGilchrist, 1905)

= Paraxanthodes cumatodes =

Species of crab

Paraxanthodes cumatodes is a species of crab found in the Red Sea and the New Caledonian Exclusive Economic Zone.
