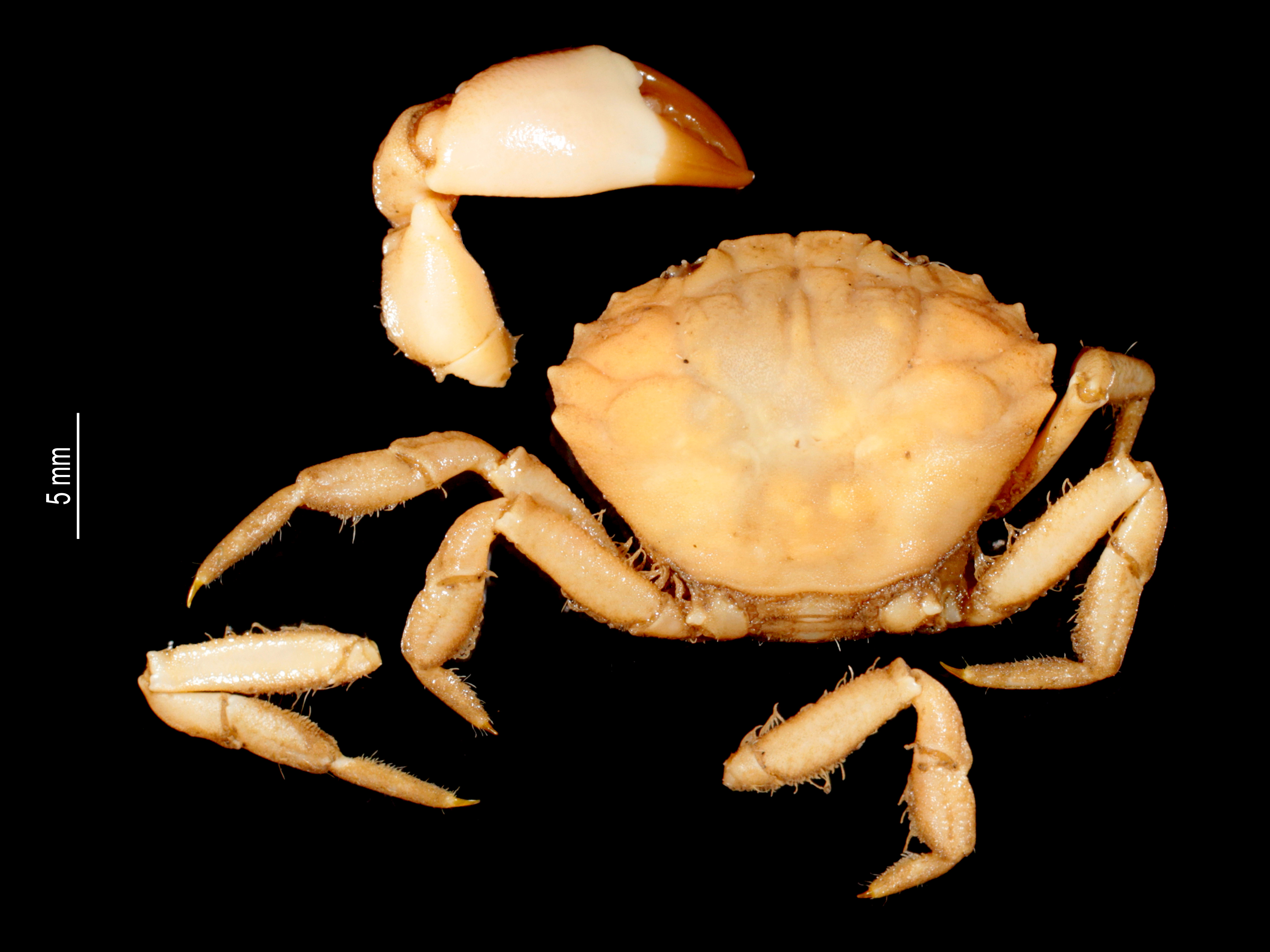

Scientific classification
- Domain: Eukaryota
- Kingdom: Animalia
- Phylum: Arthropoda
- Class: Malacostraca
- Order: Decapoda
- Suborder: Pleocyemata
- Infraorder: Brachyura
- Family: Xanthidae
- Genus: Paraxanthodes
- Species: P. polynesiensis

Binomial name
- Paraxanthodes polynesiensis (Davie, 1993)

= Paraxanthodes polynesiensis =

Species of crab

Paraxanthodes polynesiensis is a species of crab found in the French Polynesian Exclusive Economic Zone.
