= Paraxanthodes obtusidens =

Scientific classification
- Domain: Eukaryota
- Kingdom: Animalia
- Phylum: Arthropoda
- Class: Malacostraca
- Order: Decapoda
- Suborder: Pleocyemata
- Infraorder: Brachyura
- Family: Xanthidae
- Genus: Paraxanthodes
- Species: P. obtusidens

Binomial name
- Paraxanthodes obtusidens (Sakai, 1965)

Species of crab

Paraxanthodes obtusidens is a species of crab found in the bays of Japan and the China Sea.
