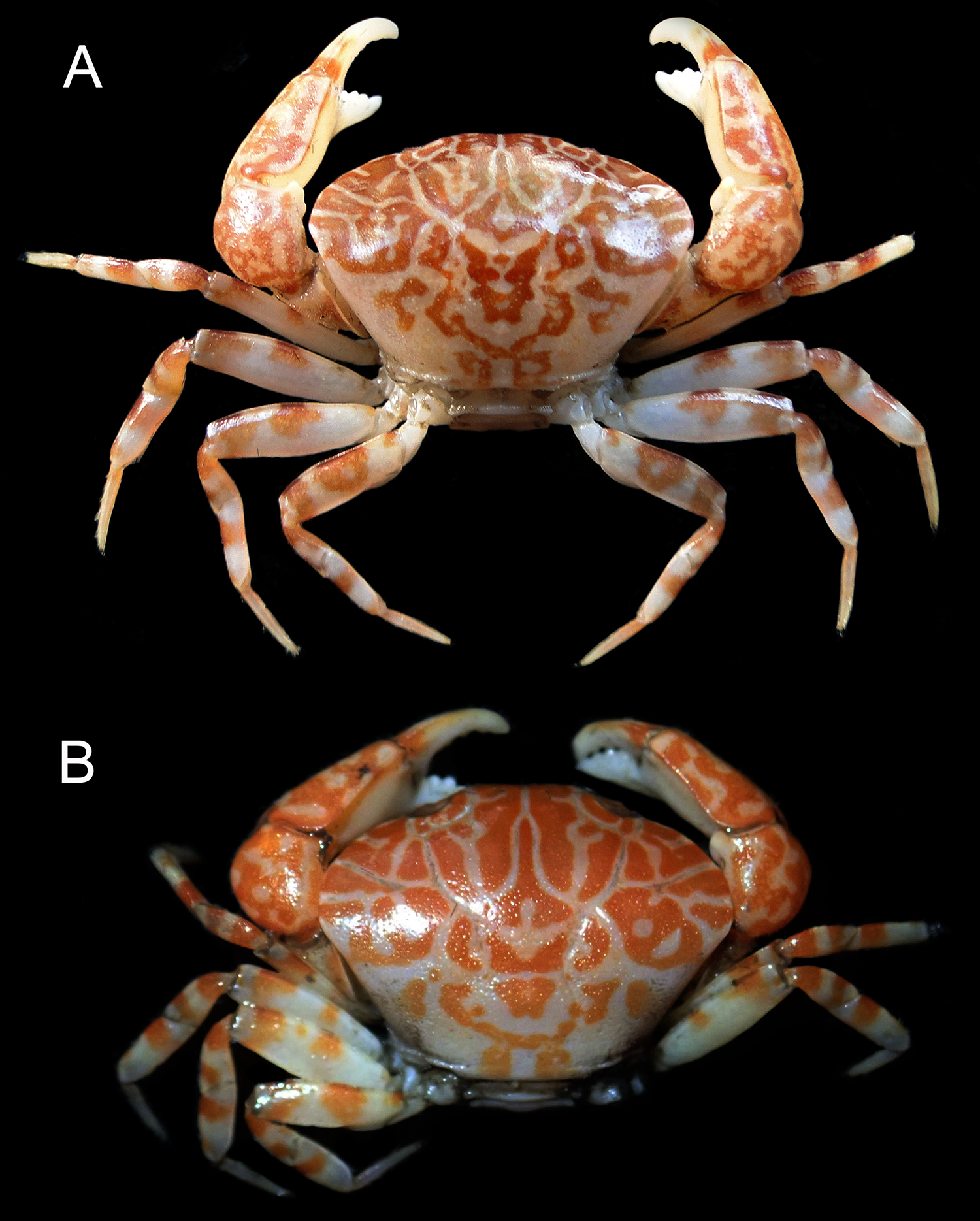
- Pulcratis amabilis

Scientific classification
- Domain: Eukaryota
- Kingdom: Animalia
- Phylum: Arthropoda
- Class: Malacostraca
- Order: Decapoda
- Suborder: Pleocyemata
- Infraorder: Brachyura
- Family: Xanthidae
- Subfamily: Zosiminae
- Genus: Pulcratis; Ng & Huang, 1997

= Pulcratis =

Genus of crabs

Pulcratis is a genus of crabs in the family Xanthidae.

It contains the following species:

- Pulcratis amabilis Mendoza, Mani & Ravichandran, 2020
- Pulcratis reticulatus Ng & Huang, 1997
