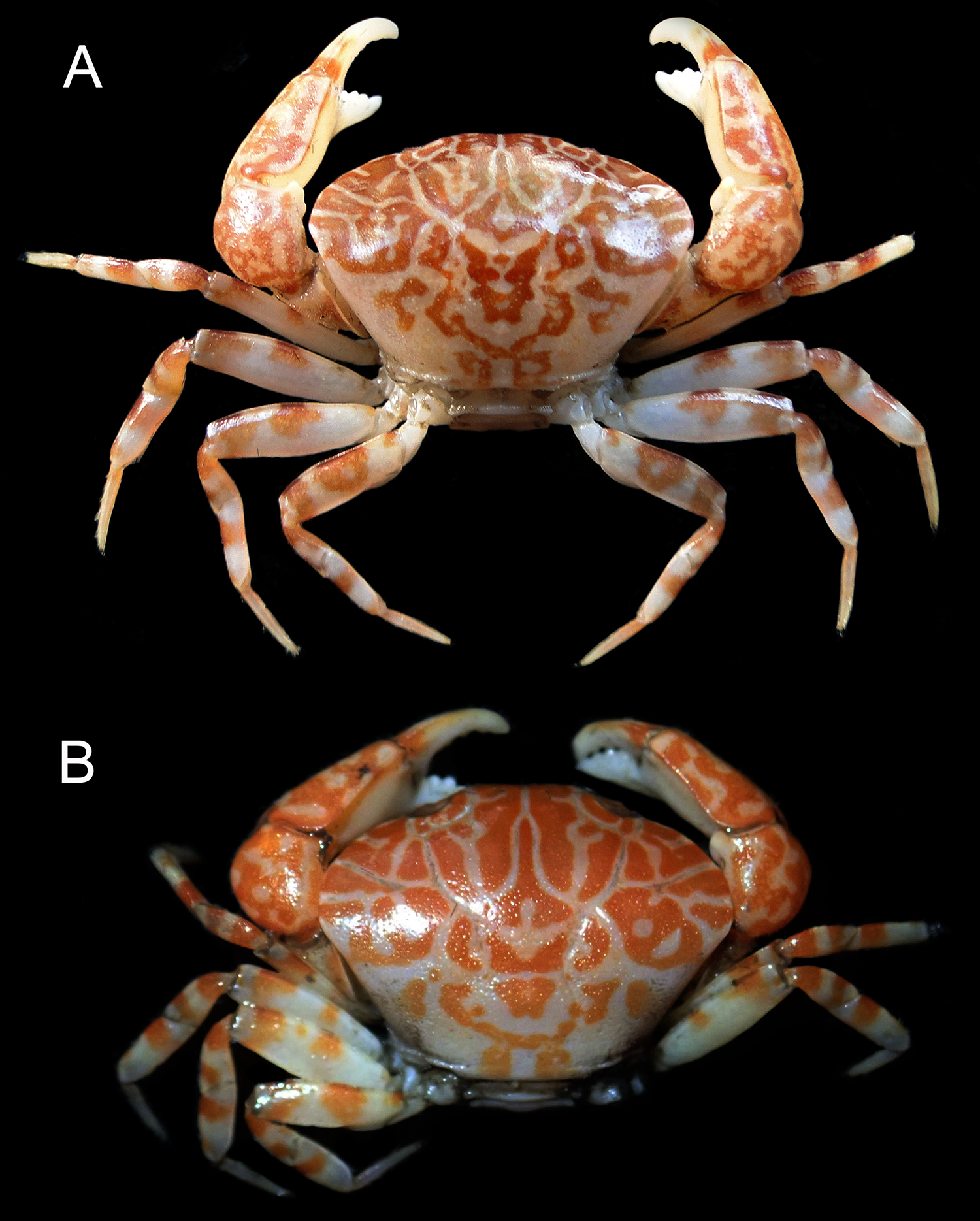
- Pulcratis amabilis

Scientific classification
- Domain: Eukaryota
- Kingdom: Animalia
- Phylum: Arthropoda
- Class: Malacostraca
- Order: Decapoda
- Suborder: Pleocyemata
- Infraorder: Brachyura
- Family: Xanthidae
- Genus: Pulcratis
- Species: P. reticulatus

Binomial name
- Pulcratis reticulatus Ng & Huang, 1997

= Pulcratis reticulatus =

Species of crab

Pulcratis reticulatus is a species of crab in the family Xanthidae.
