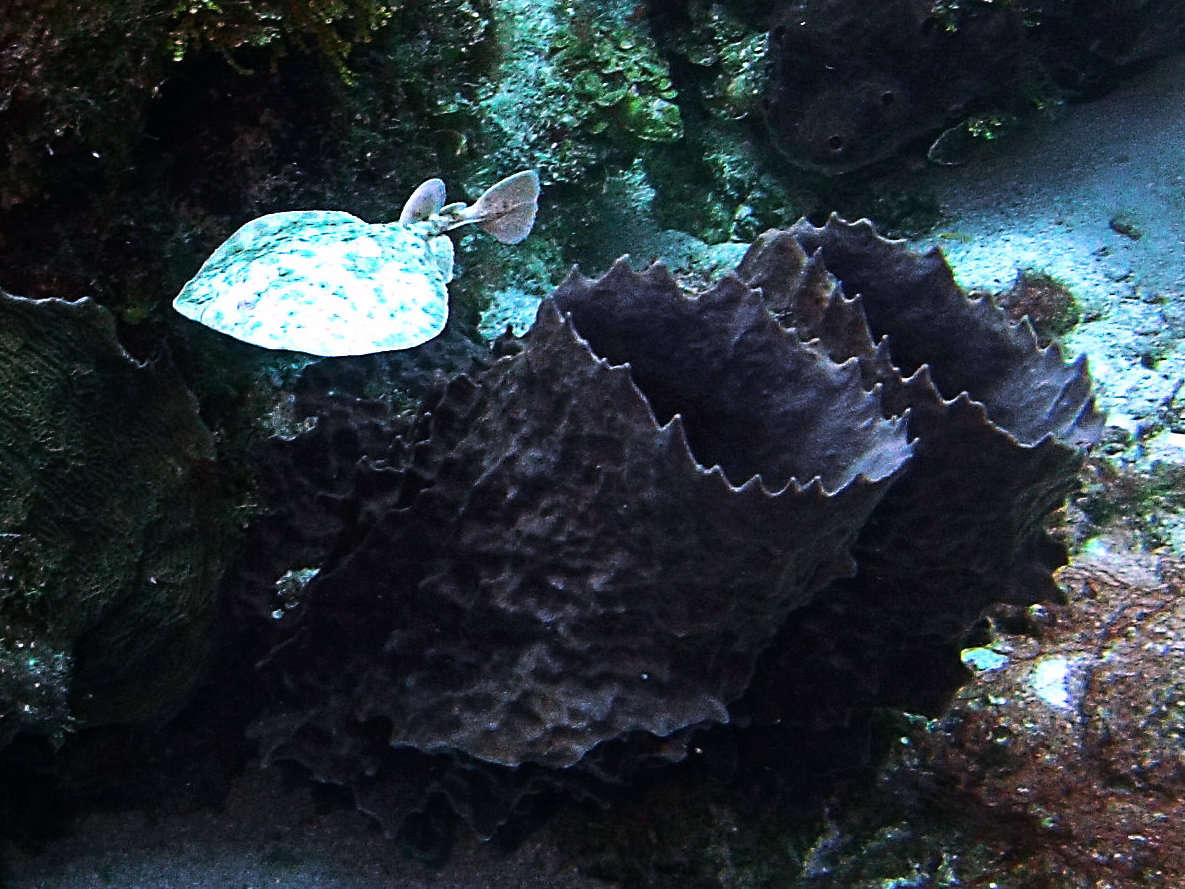
- Torpedo andersoni - possible sighting in Cozumel

Conservation status
- Least Concern (IUCN 3.1)

Scientific classification
- Kingdom: Animalia
- Phylum: Chordata
- Class: Chondrichthyes
- Subclass: Elasmobranchii
- Order: Torpediniformes
- Family: Torpedinidae
- Genus: Torpedo
- Species: T. andersoni

Binomial name
- Torpedo andersoni Bullis, 1962
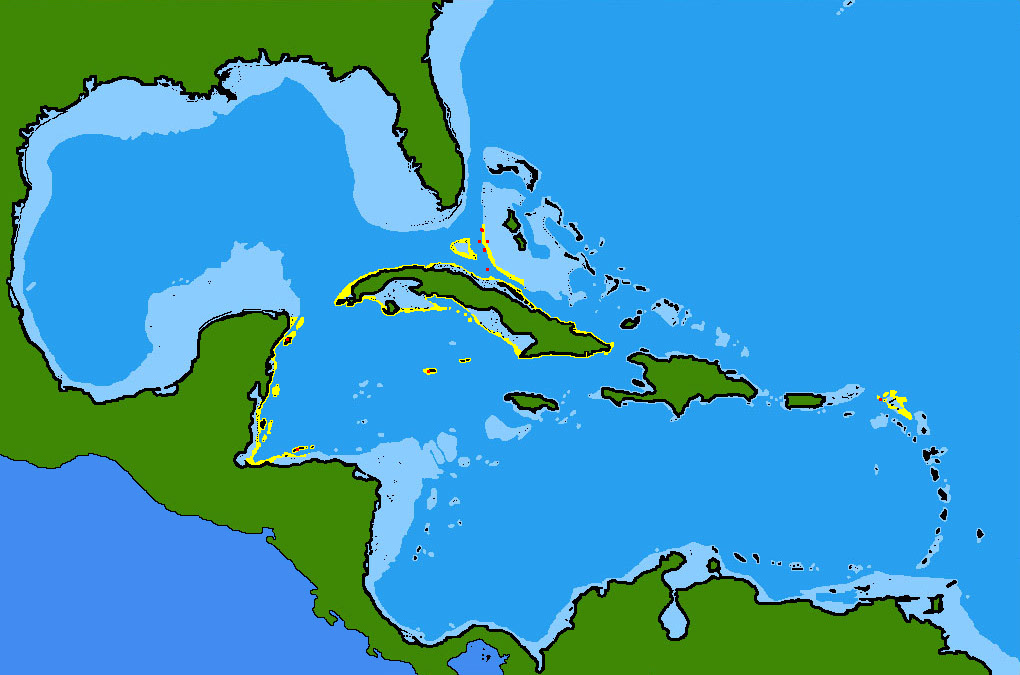

= Florida torpedo =

Species of cartilaginous fish

The Florida torpedo (Torpedo andersoni) is a rare and little-known species of electric ray in the family Torpedinidae. It is known only from two specimens and some wild sightings. Torpedoes have been recorded from three scattered locations in the Florida Straits and the western Caribbean Sea, and appear to inhabit coral habitats.

A small species growing up to 32 cm (13 in) long, the Florida torpedo has a nearly circular pectoral fin disc with a short, thick tail. It can be identified by its distinctive dorsal coloration of many brown blotches on a tan background, and the relatively forward position of its first dorsal fin.

== Taxonomy ==
The sole two specimens of the Florida torpedo were caught over the western Grand Cayman Bank in November 1960 by the Silver Bay, which was conducting exploratory shrimp trawling on behalf of the U.S. Bureau of Commercial Fisheries (a predecessor of the National Marine Fisheries Service). The species was described in a 1962 issue of Bulletin of Marine Science of the Gulf and Caribbean by Harvey Bullis, who named it after his colleague and mentor William Anderson. The larger, 22 cm (8.7 in) long adult male specimen was designated the holotype. This species belongs to the subgenus Torpedo, and is most similar to the New Zealand torpedo (T. fairchildi), the panther electric ray (T. panthera), and the black-spotted torpedo (T. fuscomaculata).

== Distribution and habitat ==
The two original specimens of the Florida torpedo came from a depth of 229 m (751 ft) on the upper continental slope of the western Grand Cayman Bank, in the Florida Straits. This ray has also been observed off the Grand Cayman and San Andreas Islands in the western Caribbean Sea, in both cases amongst scattered coral and gorgonians at depths of 11 and 18 m (36 and 59 ft) respectively.

== Description ==
Thick and flabby, the Florida torpedo has a nearly circular pectoral fin disc wider than long. The leading margin of the disc is scalloped, while the trailing margins are frilly. The eyes are immediately followed by trapezoidal spiracles, each of which has a small knob or papilla on the posterior rim. The nostrils are long and angled, with the skin between them merged into a curtain that reaches the mouth; the posterior margin of the nasal curtain is wavy. The mouth contains 14 upper and 16 lower tooth rows; each tooth has a single, slightly inward-curving cusp. There are five pairs of gill slits.

The tail is short and robust, with a prominent "keel" of skin running along either side. There are two dorsal fins with nearly straight trailing margins; the first is tall with a pointed apex, while the second is much smaller with a rounded apex. The bases of the pelvic fins extend past the first dorsal fin base. The caudal fin is broadly triangular, with a gently convex trailing margin. The skin is entirely devoid of dermal denticles. This species is light tan above and lighter below, darkening slightly towards the disc margins. The entire upper surface is covered by a mottled pattern of small, irregularly spaced brown blotches. The maximum known length is 32 cm (13 in). The only other Torpedo species in the northwestern Atlantic Ocean, the Atlantic torpedo (T. nobiliana), is larger, uniformly dark in color, lacks papillae on its spiracles, and has a more posteriorly positioned first dorsal fin.

== Biology and ecology ==
Virtually nothing is known of the natural history of the Florida torpedo. Like other members of its family, it is capable of producing an electric shock for defense. Reproduction is presumably aplacental viviparous as in other electric rays.

== Human interactions ==
The International Union for Conservation of Nature (IUCN) has noted the rare and range-limited Florida torpedo may merit conservation concern; potential threats are bycatch in demersal trawl fisheries and tourism-related coastal development. It is assessed as Least Concern at present.
