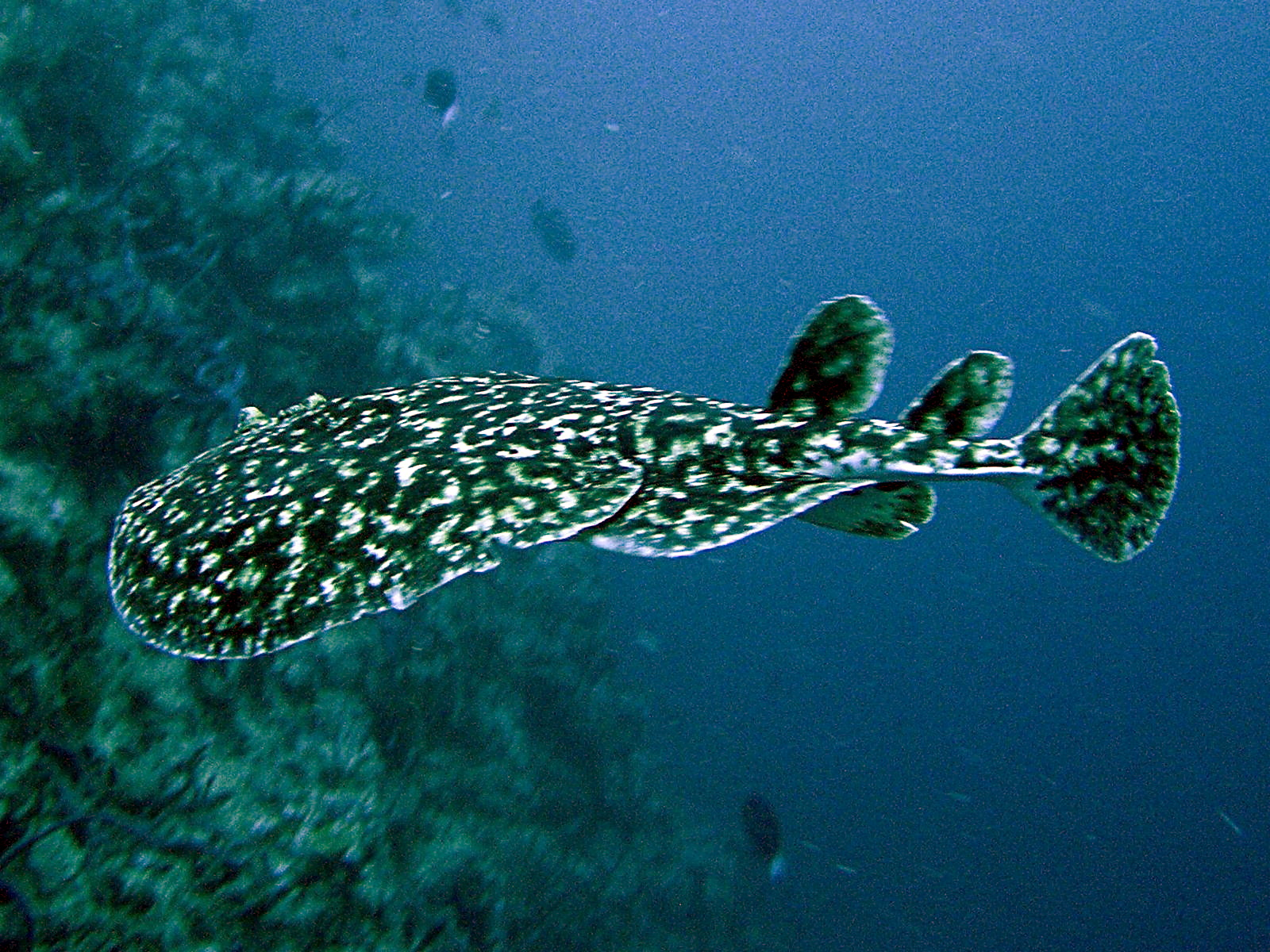

Conservation status
- Data Deficient (IUCN 3.1)

Scientific classification
- Kingdom: Animalia
- Phylum: Chordata
- Class: Chondrichthyes
- Subclass: Elasmobranchii
- Order: Torpediniformes
- Family: Torpedinidae
- Genus: Torpedo
- Species: T. fuscomaculata

Binomial name
- Torpedo fuscomaculata W. K. H. Peters, 1855

Synonyms
- Narcacion fuscomaculatus (Peters, 1855); Narcacion polleni Bleeker, 1866; Torpedo smithii Günther, 1870

= Blackspotted torpedo =

Species of cartilaginous fish

The black-spotted torpedo (Torpedo fuscomaculata) is a poorly known, uncommon species of electric ray in the family Torpedinidae, known for being capable of generating an electric shock. It is endemic to southern Africa and possibly several small Indian Ocean islands, although the latter reports may represent undescribed new species. Its appearance is similar to the Gulf torpedo (Torpedo sinuspersici), but it is duller in coloration.

== Distribution and habitat ==
This species occurs in the western Indian Ocean, from South Africa east of Cape Agulhas to Zanzibar, and possibly as far north as Kenya. There are reports of it from Somalia, but they are unconfirmed. It is also found around Madagascar, the Seychelles, and Mauritius. It frequents estuaries and the intertidal zone to a depth of 439 m, as well as in sandy areas near deep rocky reefs. There are anecdotal accounts of it traveling up rivers and estuary systems in the Eastern Cape of South Africa, such as the Kariega Estuary 2 km from the coast. The salinity of these waterways has recently increased for unknown reasons.

== Description ==
The maximum reported length for this ray is 64 cm. It has a rounded pectoral fin disc and two dorsal fins, with the base of the first placed entirely above the pelvic fins. The tail has a ridge-like lateral fold and a small caudal fin. The spiracles are fringed with small papillae. The clasper glans region does not have an integumental flap, as in Torpedo panthera and Torpedo adenensis. The coloration is generally yellowish or reddish-brown above, with numerous closely packed dark brown spots. However, there is enormous variation in the number, size, and disposition of the darker spots, and some specimens have a dark grayish- or blackish-brown dorsal coloration with no spots at all. Other specimens have gray flecks along with the darker spots, or an altogether gray coloration. The population from Mauritius may be distinct, as they have smaller, more regularly displayed spots on a lighter background color.

== Biology and ecology ==
The diet of the black-spotted torpedo consists of fish and cuttlefish, which are probably stunned using electricity. Like other electric rays it is ovoviviparous, with parturition taking place in summer.

== Relationship to humans ==
Monitoring, abundance estimates, and basic biological data are needed for the black-spotted torpedo in order to assess its conservation status. It is taken as by-catch by inshore trawl fisheries and anglers, and its shallow estuarine and intertidal habitats are vulnerable to coastal development. Resolving its taxonomy may reveal that this species has a much more restricted range than previously thought.
