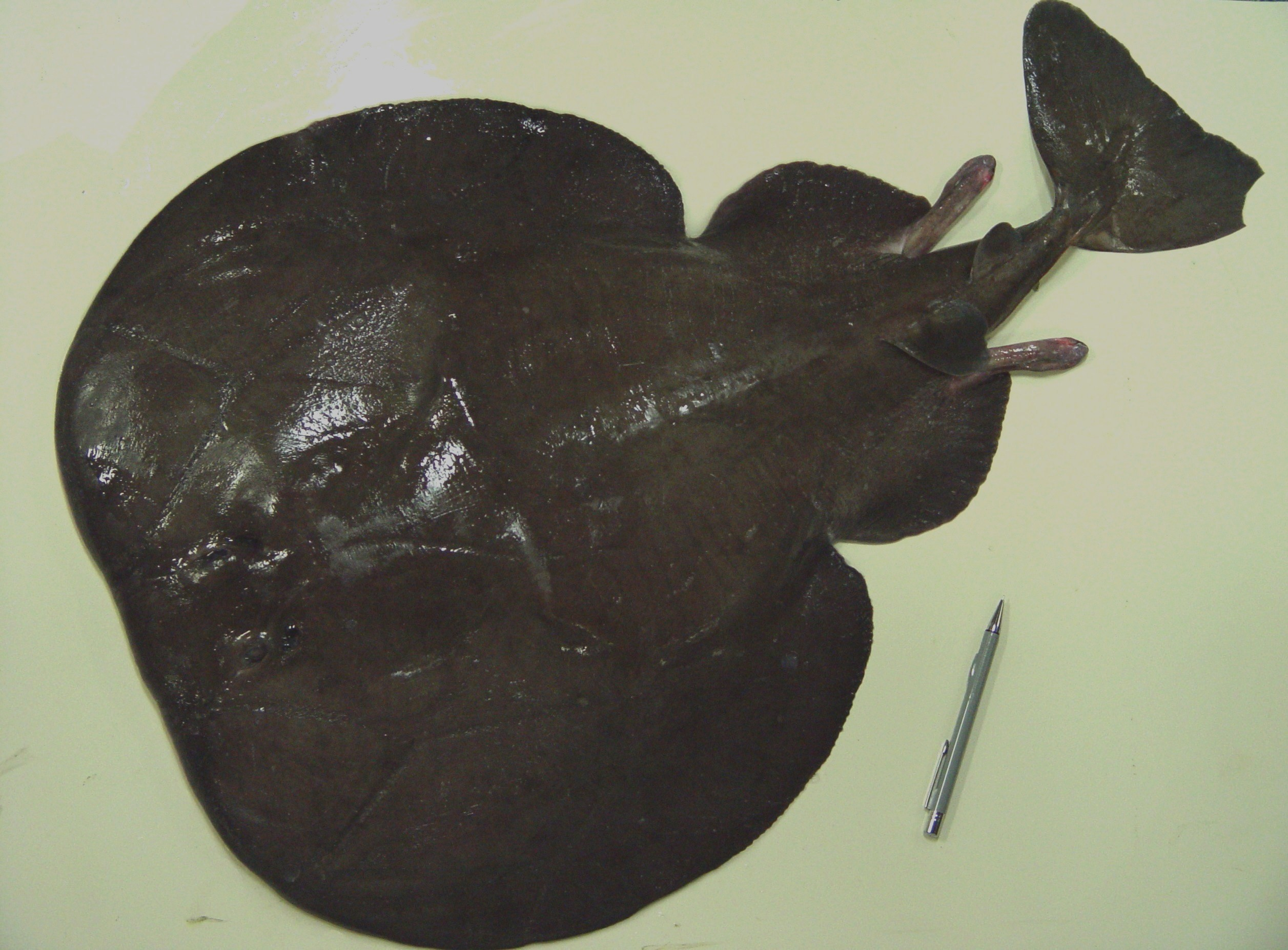
- Tetronarce nobiliana

Scientific classification
- Kingdom: Animalia
- Phylum: Chordata
- Class: Chondrichthyes
- Subclass: Elasmobranchii
- Order: Torpediniformes
- Family: Torpedinidae
- Genus: Tetronarce; T. N. Gill, 1862

Species
- Nine; see text

= Tetronarce =

Genus of cartilaginous fishes

Tetronarce is a genus of ray fish, commonly known as electric rays. They are slow-moving bottom-dwellers capable of generating electricity as a defense and feeding mechanism. Tetronarce species tend to attain a much larger size of up to 180 cm TL than Torpedo electric rays species, which usually range from 25 to 80 cm TL.

== Species ==
There are nine recognized species in this genus:

Image	Name	Common name	Distribution
	Tetronarce californica Ayres, 1855	Pacific electric ray	northeastern Pacific Ocean from Baja California to British Columbia.
	Tetronarce cowleyi Ebert, D. L. Haas & M. R. de Carvalho, 2015	Cowley's torpedo ray	around southern Africa, from Walvis Bay, Namibia to Algoa Bay, Eastern Cape, South Africa
	Tetronarce fairchildi F. W. Hutton, 1872	New Zealand torpedo	New Zealand
	Tetronarce formosa D. L. Haas & Ebert, 2006	Taiwan torpedo	Northwest Pacific: Taiwan.
	Tetronarce macneilli Whitley, 1932	Shorttail torpedo	southern Australia from Port Hedland to the Swain Reefs
	Tetronarce nobiliana Bonaparte, 1835	Atlantic torpedo	Atlantic Ocean, from Nova Scotia to Brazil in the west and from Scotland to West Africa and off southern Africa in the east
	Tetronarce puelcha Lahille, 1926	Argentine torpedo	Argentina, Brazil, and Uruguay.
	Tetronarce tokionis S. Tanaka (I), 1908	Trapezoid torpedo	Japan and Taiwan.
	Tetronarce tremens F. de Buen, 1959	Chilean torpedo	Chile, Colombia, Costa Rica, Ecuador, and Peru.
	Tetronarce ramanamurthyi Bineesh, Kasinath, & Ebert, 2026	Ramanamurthy's torpedo ray	Southeastern Arabian Sea.
