= Crampfish =

Crampfish may refer to any of these species of fish that can deliver electric shocks:

- Coffin ray, Hypnos monopterygius
- Atlantic torpedo, Torpedo nobiliana
- Common torpedo, Torpedo torpedo
