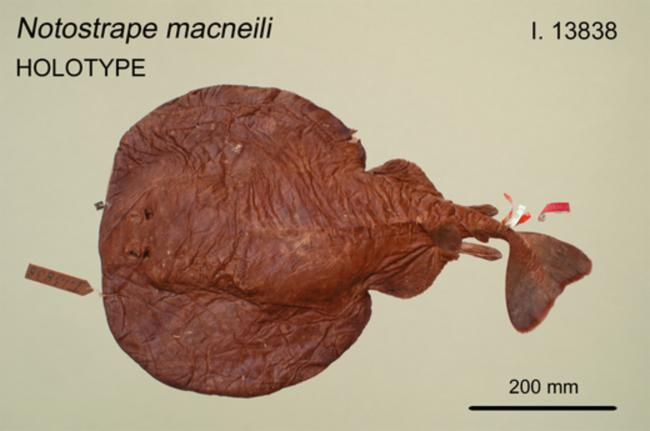

Scientific classification
- Kingdom: Animalia
- Phylum: Chordata
- Class: Chondrichthyes
- Subclass: Elasmobranchii
- Order: Torpediniformes
- Family: Torpedinidae
- Genus: Tetronarce
- Species: T. macneilli

Binomial name
- Tetronarce macneilli Whitley, 1932

Synonyms
- Notastrape macneilli Whitley, 1938; Torpedo macneilli Whitley, 1938

= Tetronarce macneilli =

Species of cartilaginous fish

Tetronarce macneilli, commonly known as the shorttail torpedo, is a species of large electric ray. The taxonomy of the species has been long debated and has been suggested that it is synonymous with Torpedo fairchildi.

== Distribution and habitat ==
This species is found off of southern Australia from Port Hedland to the Swain Reefs in tropical-cool temperate waters. It is noted for having an unusually large range for a ray species. It inhabits sloped continental shelves and slopes from 90 metres (300 ft) to 750 metres (2,460 ft). It feeds on fishes and crustaceans.

== Description ==
T. macneilli can grow up to 107 centimetres (42 in) long. It is capable of delivering an intense electric shock if handled in defense and also uses this ability to hunt prey.
