= Torpedo suessii =

Conservation status
- Critically endangered, possibly extinct (IUCN 3.1)

Scientific classification
- Kingdom: Animalia
- Phylum: Chordata
- Class: Chondrichthyes
- Subclass: Elasmobranchii
- Order: Torpediniformes
- Family: Torpedinidae
- Genus: Torpedo
- Species: T. suessii

Binomial name
- Torpedo suessii Steindachner, 1898

Species of fish

Torpedo suessii, the Red Sea torpedo, is a species of torpedo ray. This species lives in the Red Sea in Yemen with the type locality being found in the harbour of Perim. This species has large dark brown spots with light brown outlines. This species is listed as critically endangered possibly extinct as it hasn't been seen since 1898.
