= Aden Gulf torpedo =

Conservation status
- Endangered (IUCN 3.1)

Scientific classification
- Kingdom: Animalia
- Phylum: Chordata
- Class: Chondrichthyes
- Subclass: Elasmobranchii
- Order: Torpediniformes
- Family: Torpedinidae
- Genus: Torpedo
- Species: T. adenensis

Binomial name
- Torpedo adenensis M. R. de Carvalho, Stehmann & Manilo, 2002

Species of cartilaginous fish

The Aden Gulf torpedo or Aden torpedo (Torpedo adenensis) is a poorly known species of electric ray in the family Torpedinidae, seemingly endemic to the eastern Gulf of Aden, near the coast of Yemen. Growing to 41 cm (16 in) long, this species has a nearly circular pectoral fin disc and a short, thick tail with two dorsal fins and a well-developed caudal fin. It is characterized by its reddish dorsal coloration, which in contrast to related species lacks any additional markings. The International Union for Conservation of Nature (IUCN) has assessed the Aden Gulf torpedo as Endangered, citing its extremely small range and the intensive shrimp trawling that occurs in the region.

== Taxonomy ==
The first specimens of the Aden Gulf torpedo were collected in 1989 by the former Soviet research ship Stefanov, and described as a new species by Marcelo R. de Carvalho, M.F.W. Stehmann, and L.G. Manilo in a 2002 issue of the scientific journal American Museum Novitates. The specific epithet adenensis refers to only region where it has been found. The type specimen is a 41-cm-long adult male. This species belongs to the subgenus Torpedo, but is unique in being plainly colored. It appears to be most closely related to the leopard torpedo (T. panthera), with which it shares a distinctive flap at the tips of the claspers.

== Distribution and habitat ==
Possibly an eastern Gulf of Aden endemic, the Aden Gulf torpedo has been caught from depths between 26 and 140 m (85 and 459 ft) at three close locations off the coast of Yemen.

== Description ==
The Aden Gulf torpedo has a thick, nearly circular pectoral fin disc wider than long, with a nearly straight anterior margin. The eyes are fairly small and immediately followed by large, rounded spiracles; each spiracle has a subtly raised rim that bears a series of tiny knob-like papillae along the posterior margin. The nostrils are surrounded by folds, and have a short and wide curtain of skin between them that reaches the mouth. The teeth are arranged with a quincunx pattern and number 33–47 rows in the upper jaw and 32–39 rows in the lower jaws. Each tooth has a single sharp cusp. There are five curved gill slits.

The tail is short and robust, and bears subtle lateral skin folds along either side. The origins of the pelvic fins lie slightly under the posterior margin of the disc. The pelvic fins are rather long and narrow; males have slender claspers that have a fleshy flap at the tip. The first dorsal fin base is located roughly over the latter half of the pelvic fin bases. The second dorsal fin is smaller and more angled than the first. The dorsal fins have more rounded apexes in females than males. The caudal fin is broad and triangular, with fairly angular corners and a nearly straight trailing margin. The skin completely lacks dermal denticles. This species is a plain reddish to orange brown above, with a very thin pale posterior margin on the dorsal and caudal fins. The underside is light cream, with darker reddish coloring along the pectoral and pelvic fin margins, outlining the ampullae of Lorenzini, and as blotches under the tail. One female specimen had faint, tiny pale spots scattered over the disc, possibly artifacts of preservation. The maximum known length is 41 cm (16 in).

== Biology and ecology ==
Virtually nothing is known of the natural history of the Aden Gulf torpedo. Like other members of its family, it has well-developed electric organs for defense and perhaps also stunning prey. This species is presumably aplacental viviparous like other electric rays. Both sexes attain sexual maturity at between 28 and 40 cm (11 and 16 in) long.

== Human interactions ==
Electric rays, such as the Aden Gulf torpedo, are susceptible to incidental capture in trawls due to their sluggish, bottom-dwelling natures. There are extensive commercial shrimp trawl fisheries operating within this species' restricted range, leading to concerns regarding its population. Therefore, the IUCN has assessed it as Endangered.
