= Tetronarce cowleyi =

Conservation status
- Least Concern (IUCN 3.1)

Scientific classification
- Kingdom: Animalia
- Phylum: Chordata
- Class: Chondrichthyes
- Subclass: Elasmobranchii
- Order: Torpediniformes
- Family: Torpedinidae
- Genus: Tetronarce
- Species: T. cowleyi

Binomial name
- Tetronarce cowleyi Ebert, D. L. Haas & M. R. de Carvalho, 2015

Species of cartilaginous fish

Tetronarce cowleyi (common name: South African torpedo or Cowley's torpedo ray) is a species of electric ray found around southern Africa, from Walvis Bay, Namibia to Algoa Bay, Eastern Cape, South Africa. It is listed as "least concern" on the IUCN Red List.
