= Smalldisk torpedo =

Conservation status
- Least Concern (IUCN 3.1)

Scientific classification
- Kingdom: Animalia
- Phylum: Chordata
- Class: Chondrichthyes
- Subclass: Elasmobranchii
- Order: Torpediniformes
- Family: Torpedinidae
- Genus: Tetronarce
- Species: T. microdiscus

Binomial name
- Tetronarce microdiscus Parin & Kotlyar, 1985

Species of fish

The smalldisk torpedo (Tetronarce microdiscus) is a species of fish in the family Torpedinidae. Its natural habitat is open seas off the west coast of South America.
