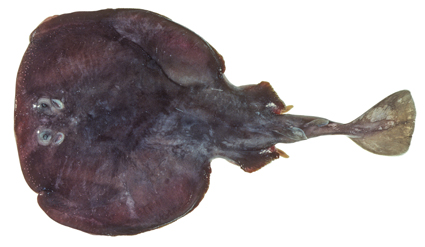

Conservation status
- Least Concern (IUCN 3.1)

Scientific classification
- Kingdom: Animalia
- Phylum: Chordata
- Class: Chondrichthyes
- Subclass: Elasmobranchii
- Order: Torpediniformes
- Family: Torpedinidae
- Genus: Tetronarce
- Species: T. tokionis

Binomial name
- Tetronarce tokionis (S. Tanaka (I), 1908)

Synonyms
- Torpedo tokionis Tanaka, 1908

= Tetronarce tokionis =

Species of cartilaginous fish

Tetronarce tokionis, also known as the trapezoid electric ray, is a species of electric ray in the family Torpedinidae.

== Distribution ==
The trapezoid torpedo ray is known from coastal waters off Japan, Taiwan, and Hawaiʻi.
