= Argentine torpedo =

- On a beach in Garopaba, SC, Brazil

Conservation status
- Critically Endangered (IUCN 3.1)

Scientific classification
- Kingdom: Animalia
- Phylum: Chordata
- Class: Chondrichthyes
- Subclass: Elasmobranchii
- Order: Torpediniformes
- Family: Torpedinidae
- Genus: Tetronarce
- Species: T. puelcha

Binomial name
- Tetronarce puelcha Lahille, 1926

Synonyms
- Torpedo puelcha Lahille, 1926

Species of fish

Tetronarce puelcha, commonly known as the Argentine torpedo, is a species of fish in the family Torpedinidae. It is found in Argentina, Brazil, and Uruguay. Its natural habitat is open seas. It is an electric ray fish species found in South West Atlantic (mostly in Argentina and Brazil). It is moderately large at a length of 104 cm (41 in).

It was first described in 1926 as Torpedo puelcha by Fernando Lahille.
