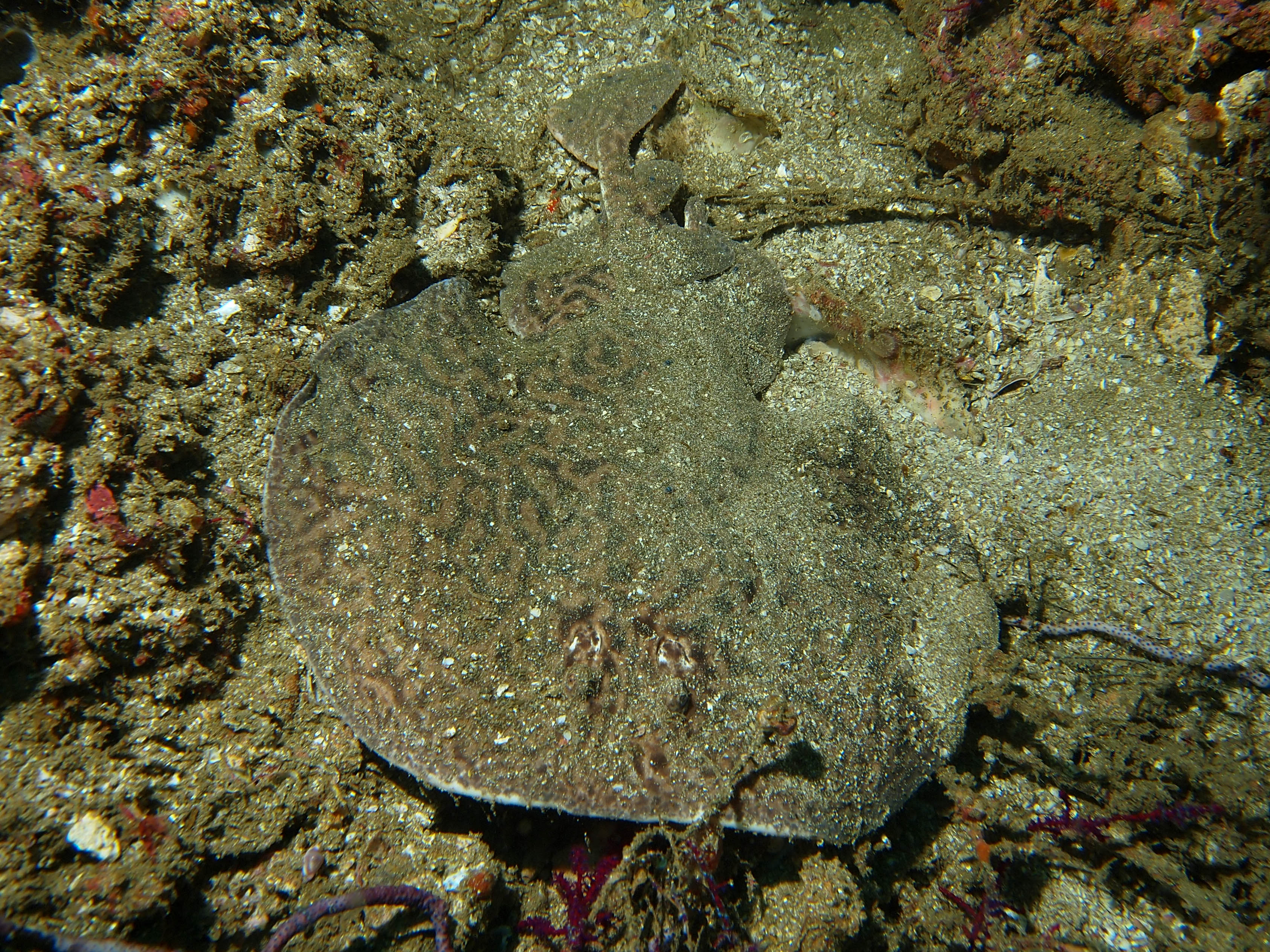

Conservation status
- Data Deficient (IUCN 3.1)

Scientific classification
- Kingdom: Animalia
- Phylum: Chordata
- Class: Chondrichthyes
- Subclass: Elasmobranchii
- Order: Torpediniformes
- Family: Torpedinidae
- Genus: Torpedo
- Species: T. sinuspersici

Binomial name
- Torpedo sinuspersici Olfers, 1831
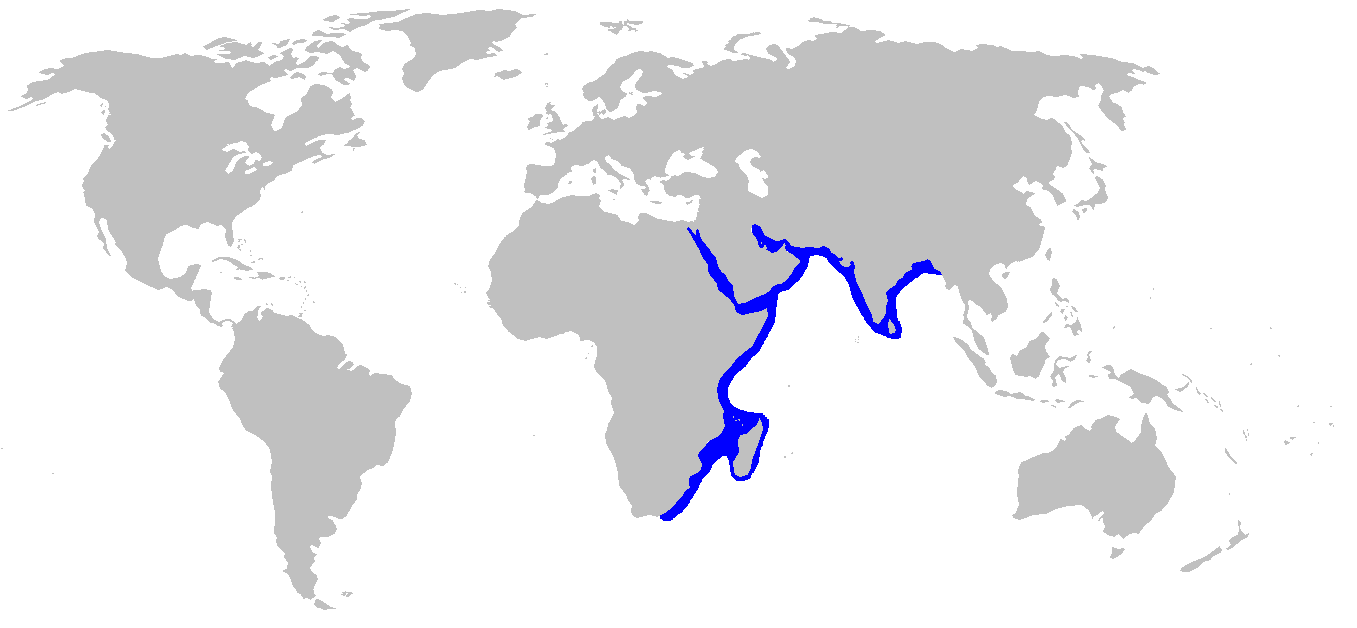
- Range of the Gulf torpedo

= Gulf torpedo =

Persian Gulf torpedo

Species of cartilaginous fish

The Gulf torpedo (Torpedo sinuspersici) or variable electric ray, is a species of electric ray in the family Torpedinidae. It is found in the Indian Ocean, but may represent a species flock of several local endemic species. It is distinguishable from other Torpedo species in its range by its ornate dorsal coloration. Another common name, marbled electric ray, is not to be confused with Torpedo marmorata.

== Distribution and habitat ==
The Gulf torpedo is the most widespread of the electric rays in the western Indian Ocean, with a patchy range extending to South Africa, Somalia, the Red Sea, the Arabian Sea, the Persian Gulf, Sri Lanka, and the Andaman Sea. There are also less reliable reports of it occurring elsewhere, including Madagascar, the Seychelles, and the Laccadive Islands. Recorded for the first time in 2002 in Mediterranean Sea, its presence needs to be clarified due to its strong resemblance with Torpedo marmorata, a species well established there. It is found in shallow waters in sandy areas, on and near coral reefs, and offshore to a depth of 150 meters. It often buries itself in the sandy bottom of gullies and estuaries. The Gulf torpedo occurs in water temperatures of 20–29 °C (68–84 °F).

== Description ==
The Gulf torpedo has a rounded pectoral fin disc, 84% as wide as long. The tail is short and stocky, bearing two small, subtriangular dorsal fins placed very close together, with the second three-quarters the size of the first. The pelvic fins are fleshy and partly fused to the disc, while the caudal fin is small and broadly rounded. The eyes are small; the spiracles are larger than the eyes in adults and bear 9-10 papillae on the rim. The skin is smooth. The mouth is wide and contains small, sharply cusped teeth. It measures up to 130 cm long, although most are less than 100 cm. The angling record from South Africa is 13 kg.

This species has distinctive dorsal coloration, composed of a base brown color with strong, thick cream or white vermiculations over the disc, pelvic fins, and tail, with many cream-colored irregular spots, no larger than eye diameter, on the anterior and lateral disc regions. However, the coloration varies somewhat within the species. Some specimens have cream-colored brain-shaped figures or rosettes over the disc and tail, becoming smaller towards the disc margins, along with small spots laterally on the disc and the front of the snout. Juveniles have a dorsal surface similar in appearance to that of adults, but it is sometimes somewhat covered in white spots.

== Biology and ecology ==
The Gulf torpedo spends the day buried in sand.

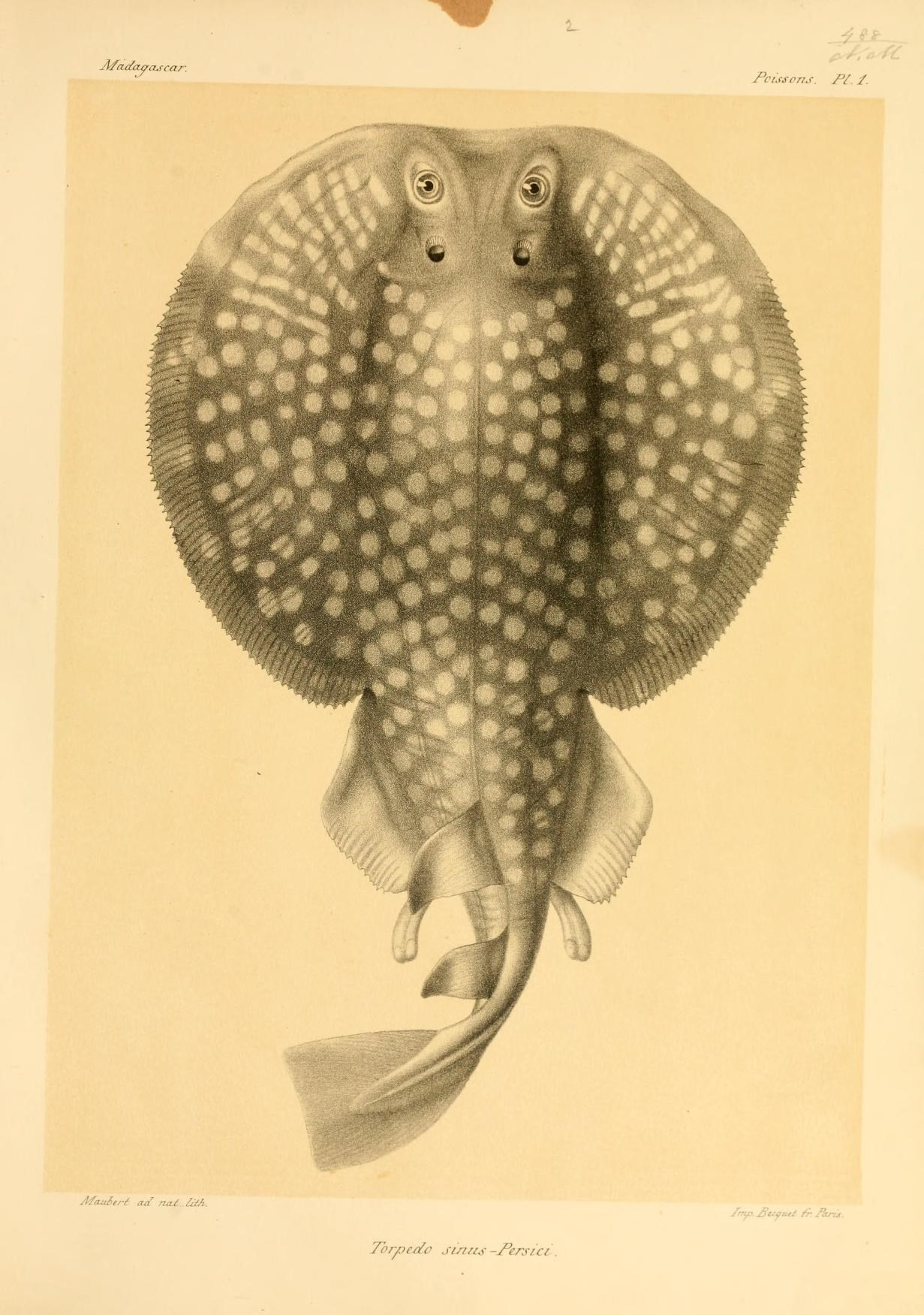
Illustration of the species.

Little is known of the life history of the Gulf torpedo. It is a sluggish predator of bony fishes. At night it actively hunts for food, sculling slowly through the water about a meter above the bottom; during the day it usually rests on the bottom and opportunistically ambushes unwary prey. It uses its broad pectoral fins to envelop the target fish before delivering an electric shock to stun it. Usually solitary, they may form groups during the mating season. Reproduction is aplacental viviparous, with the developing embryos initially surviving on their yolk sacs, and then on enriched uterine fluid produced by the mother.The gestation period lasts between 6-8 months. Litters of 9-22 young are birthed in the summer. Newborns measure about 10 cm wide; males mature at a disc width of 39 cm and females at 45 cm.

== Human interactions ==
The Gulf torpedo may be threatened by habitat degradation, as well as being caught as bycatch in trawling fisheries. However, its conservation status is difficult to assess as the species may represent a flock of several local species. It is often encountered by divers and can give a startling shock if molested. The flesh is edible and it is occasionally caught by shore anglers. Spear fishing for this species is illegal in Natal.
