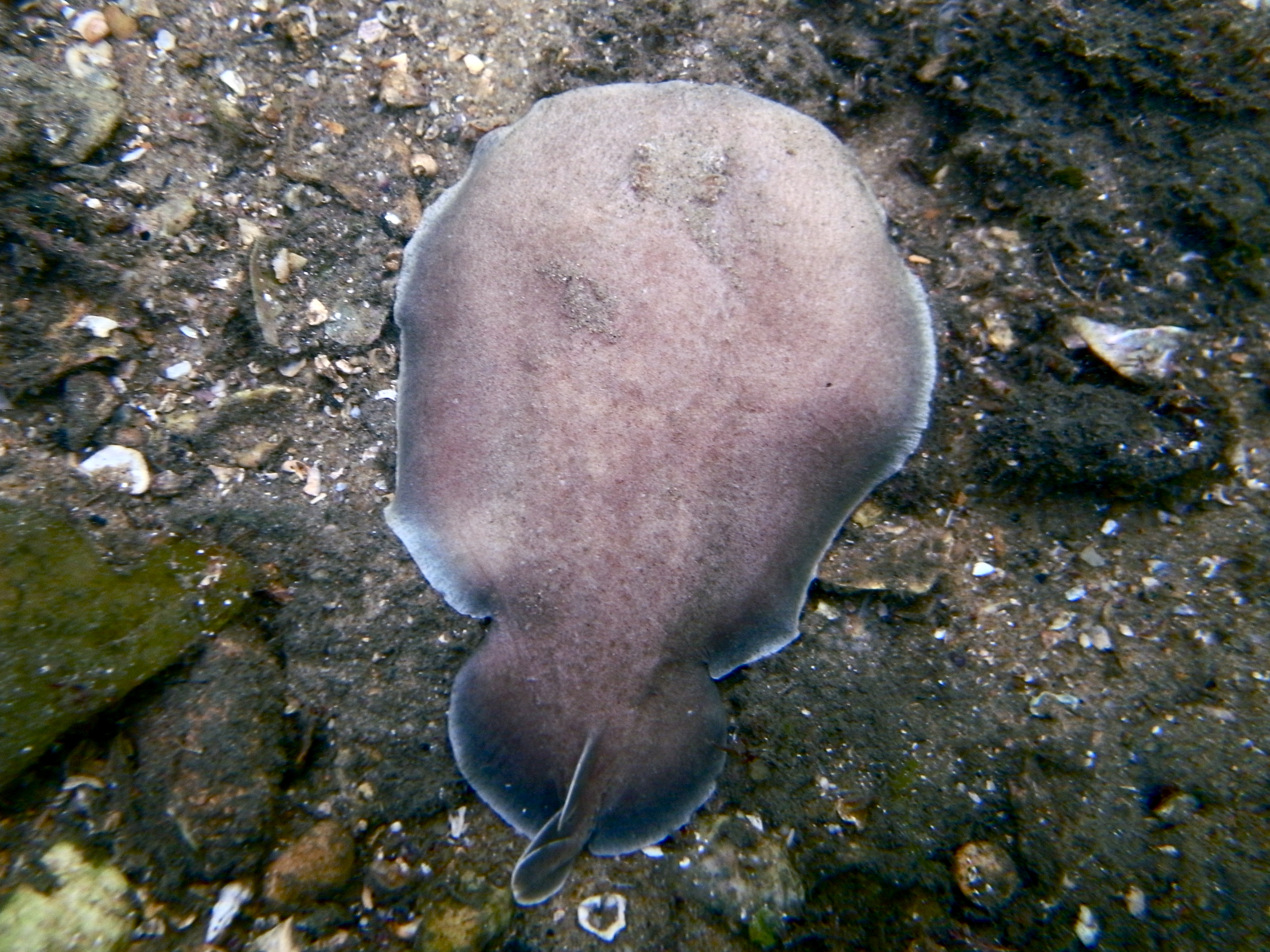

Conservation status
- Least Concern (IUCN 3.1)

Scientific classification
- Kingdom: Animalia
- Phylum: Chordata
- Class: Chondrichthyes
- Subclass: Elasmobranchii
- Order: Torpediniformes
- Family: Hypnidae; T. N. Gill, 1862
- Genus: Hypnos; A. H. A. Duméril, 1852
- Species: H. monopterygius

Binomial name
- Hypnos monopterygius (G. Shaw, 1795)
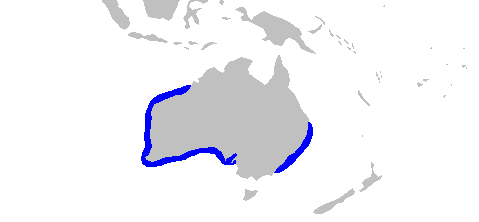
- Range of the coffin ray

Synonyms
- Hypnos subnigrum Duméril, 1852; Lophius monopterygius Shaw, 1795

= Coffin ray =

Species of cartilaginous fish

Hypnos monopterygius, also known as the coffin ray or Australian numbfish, is a species of electric ray endemic to Australia, where it is common in inshore waters shallower than 80 m (260 ft). It is the sole member of its genus Hypnos, and family Hypnidae. This small species typically reaches 40 cm (16 in) in length. Greatly enlarged pectoral fins and an extremely short tail, coupled with diminutive dorsal and caudal fins all concentrated towards the rear, give the coffin ray a distinctive pear-like shape. It is a varying shade of brown in colour above, and has tiny eyes and a large, highly distensible mouth.

The sluggish and nocturnal coffin ray frequents sandy or muddy habitats, where it can bury itself during daytime. Able to produce a powerful electric shock reaching 200 volts for attack and defense, it can deliver a severe – albeit non-fatal – shock to a human. This species is a voracious predator that feeds mainly on benthic bony fishes, often tackling fish approaching or exceeding itself in size. On occasion, it may also consume invertebrates and even small penguins and rats. Reproduction is aplacental viviparous, in which the developing embryos are nourished by yolk and maternally produced histotroph ("uterine milk"). The female gives birth to 4–8 pups during summer. Not valued commercially, it is very hardy and can usually survive being captured and discarded. The International Union for Conservation of Nature (IUCN) has listed this species under Least Concern, as its population does not seem threatened by human activity.

== Taxonomy and phylogeny ==
The first scientific reference to the coffin ray was written by English zoologist and botanist George Shaw to accompany Frederick Polydore Nodder's illustrations of a beached fish, published in their 1795 work The Naturalist's Miscellany. Shaw interpreted the specimen as a goosefish, calling it the "single-finned Lophius" or Lophius monopterygius in Latin. Independently, French zoologist Auguste Duméril described a new electric ray in an 1852 volume of the journal Revue et Magasin de Zoologie, based on two specimens collected off New South Wales. He named it Hypnos subnigrum; the genus name is derived from ancient Greek ῠ̔́πνος (húpnos, "sleep"), for the ray's ability to induce numbness. Eventually, Gilbert Percy Whitley recognized that Nodder had illustrated the same species that Duméril had described, and thus the proper binomial name became Hypnos monopterygius. In 1902, Edgar Ravenswood Waite proposed Hypnarce as a replacement name for Hypnos, which he believed was preoccupied by the butterfly genus Hypna. However, the International Code of Zoological Nomenclature (ICZN) does not seem to require the change, and thus Hypnarce is regarded as a junior synonym.

The common name "coffin ray" comes from the coffin-like shape of beached specimens, which become bloated after death. This species may also be referred to as crampfish, electric ray, numbfish, numbie, short-tail electric ray, or torpedo. Phylogenetic studies, based on morphology, have found that Hypnos is most closely related to the genus Torpedo. Hence, some taxonomists classify it with Torpedo in the family Torpedinidae (in its own subfamily, Hypninae). On the other hand, there are also taxonomists who believe Hypnos to be distinctive enough to merit its own separate family, Hypnidae.

== Distribution and habitat ==
The coffin ray has a wide but disjunct distribution in tropical and warm-temperate Australian waters. The western part of its range extends from Gulf St Vincent in South Australia to Broome in Western Australia, and the eastern part from Eden in New South Wales to Heron Island in Queensland. It does not occur off Victoria or Tasmania. This common, bottom-dwelling species is typically found close to shore, no deeper than 80 m (260 ft), though it has been recorded from as deep as 240 m (790 ft). In 1910, the trawler Endeavour caught several coffin rays at depths ranging from 47 to 120 fathoms (86–219 metres). The coffin ray favors habitats with sandy or muddy bottoms, including beaches, estuaries, and bays, and can also be found over seagrass as well as on and around rocky and coral reefs.

== Description ==
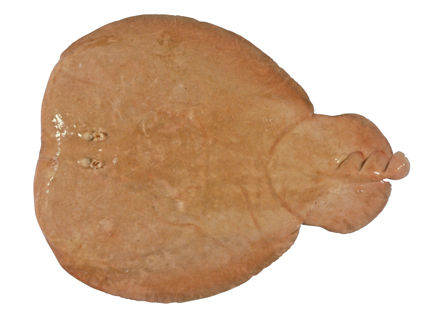
The coffin ray can be identified by its greatly enlarged pectoral fin disc and tiny tail.

The unusual pear-like shape of the coffin ray distinguishes it from all other rays. Its body is flabby, with two large, kidney-shaped electric organs visible on both sides of the head. The pectoral fins form a greatly enlarged disc about as wide as long, that is thick at the center and thin at the margins. The leading margin of the disc is straight to gently concave. The eyes are minute and can be elevated on short stalks. Close behind the eyes and slightly larger are the spiracles, which are rimmed by small papillae in some individuals. The nostrils are located just ahead of the mouth, and are connected to it by a pair of broad grooves. Between the nostrils is a short curtain of skin that overlaps the mouth. The capacious mouth forms a very long, wide arch; the slender jaws can be distended dramatically, though are not particularly protrusible. Adults have over 60 rows of small teeth in either jaw; each tooth has three long cusps. The five pairs of gill slits are small and placed beneath the disc.

The pelvic fins are relatively large and merged with the pectoral fin disc at the front to form a roughly circular secondary disc. The two dorsal fins are shaped like rounded lobes and are located very close to the caudal fin, which is of similar size with a nearly symmetrical, rounded margin. The tail is extremely short, such as that the caudal fin barely extends past the pelvic fin disc. The skin is entirely devoid of dermal denticles, and may be creased in areas. The dorsal colouration ranges from dark to reddish brown, to grayish, pinkish, or yellowish, and may be plain or sparsely patterned with irregular darker and lighter markings. The underside is pale, as are the spiracle papillae. This species grows to a length of 70 cm (28 in), or possibly even 92 cm (36 in), though most are only around 40 cm (16 in) long.

== Biology and ecology ==
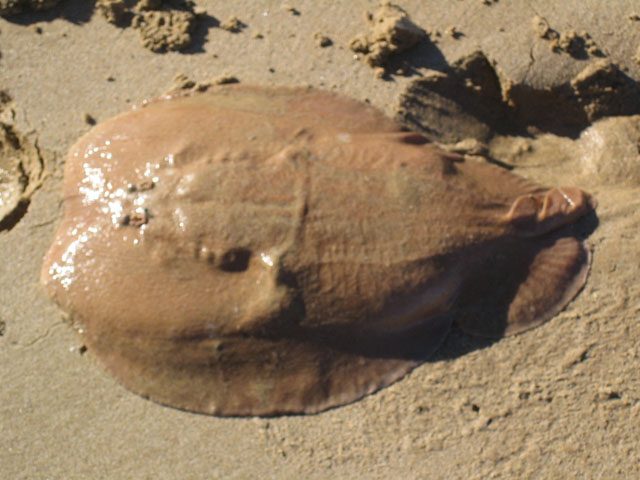
Coffin rays are often stranded on the shore.

The coffin ray is a slow and weak swimmer that moves forward with a jerky, fluttery motion. It is nocturnal and spends most of the day buried in sediment with only its spiracles showing. When disturbed, it has been observed performing a possible defense behavior, wherein it erupts from the bottom and swims in a loop with its mouth agape. This species is sometimes stranded on land by the ebbing tide, but can survive out of water for hours. Like in other electric rays, the coffin ray's electric organs are derived from muscle tissue and consist of numerous vertical columns, each formed from a stack of jelly-filled "electric plates" that essentially acts as a battery. It is capable of generating up to 200 volts of electricity and delivering 50 shocks over span of ten minutes, with each successive shock weakening. The coffin ray employs electricity both to subdue prey and deter predators.

The diet of the coffin ray consists mostly of benthic bony fishes, but also includes cephalopods and on occasion crustaceans and polychaete worms. Penguins and rats have also been recorded from the stomachs of this species. The coffin ray ambushes prey from the substrate, and swallows them whole head-first before re-burying. It often takes extremely large prey relative to its size; one observed individual 60 cm (24 in) long had swallowed a flathead (Platycephalus sp.) 70 cm (28 in) long, and the tail of the prey fish was still protruding from its mouth. Dead specimens have been recovered that had apparently choked trying to swallow too-large prey. The coffin ray is aplacental viviparous, in which the developing embryos are nourished by yolk, later supplemented by histotroph ("uterine milk") secreted by the mother. Females give birth to litters of 4–8 pups in summer; the newborns measure approximately 8–11 cm (3.1–4.3 in) long. Males and females both attain sexual maturity around 40–48 cm (16–19 in) long. This species is known to be parasitized by the tapeworms Acanthobothrium angelae and Lacistorhynchus dollfusi, and the nematode Echinocephalus overstreeti.

They are preyed upon by tiger sharks. One large tiger shark caught at Port Stephens in the early 20th century had more than thirty of them in its stomach.

== Human interactions ==
When approached, the coffin ray tends to keep still in its place of concealment on the sea floor. As a result, many divers, swimmers, and bathers have been shocked after accidentally contacting it. While not life-threatening, the shock can be quite severe; strong enough to numb a human limb for several minutes or knock a standing adult human off their feet. The shock can still be perceived by a person pouring a stream of seawater on the ray, or handling a net in which a coffin ray is held. The fish is capable of issuing multiple shocks in a short period of time, though each shock is weaker than the last.

In 1883, Edward Pierson Ramsay noted that it was the only ray native to Port Jackson that was inedible. The coffin ray has no economic value. It is caught incidentally by commercial trawlers, but is hardy enough to usually be returned to the water alive. It is also caught in lobster traps and infrequently taken by spear fishers. As it remains common and widespread, the International Union for Conservation of Nature (IUCN) has assessed this species as Least Concern. It has been kept in public aquariums, but requires moving food.
