= Chilean torpedo =

Conservation status
- Least Concern (IUCN 3.1)

Scientific classification
- Kingdom: Animalia
- Phylum: Chordata
- Class: Chondrichthyes
- Subclass: Elasmobranchii
- Order: Torpediniformes
- Family: Torpedinidae
- Genus: Tetronarce
- Species: T. tremens

Binomial name
- Tetronarce tremens F. de Buen, 1959

Synonyms
- Torpedo tremens de Buen, 1959

Species of fish

Tetronarce tremens, commonly known as the Chilean torpedo, is a species of fish in the family Torpedinidae. It is found in Chile, Colombia, Costa Rica, Ecuador, and Peru. Its natural habitat is open seas.
