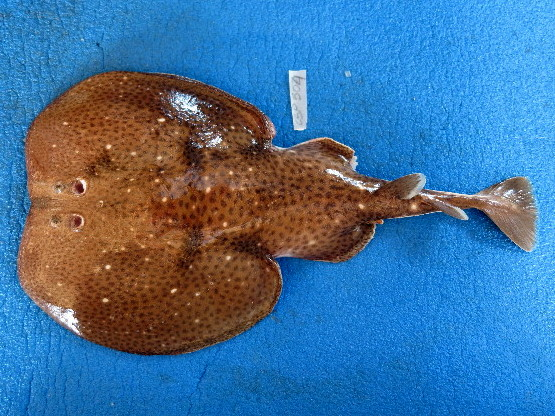

Conservation status
- Endangered (IUCN 3.1)

Scientific classification
- Domain: Eukaryota
- Kingdom: Animalia
- Phylum: Chordata
- Class: Chondrichthyes
- Subclass: Elasmobranchii
- Order: Torpediniformes
- Family: Torpedinidae
- Genus: Torpedo
- Species: T. mackayana

Binomial name
- Torpedo mackayana Metzelaar, 1919

= Torpedo mackayana =

Species of cartilaginous fish

Torpedo mackayana, commonly known as the ringed torpedo, Western African torpedo, West African torpedo ray, McKay electric ray, or McKay's torpedo ray, is an electric ray species in the family Torpedinidae, which lives in shallow waters on the western coast of Africa. Characterized by rounded spiracles and white and brown spots, females grow to 35–50 centimetres (14–20 in) and males to 31.5–38.2 centimetres (12.4–15.0 in).

== Taxonomy ==
Torpedo mackayana was described in 1919 by Jan Metzelaar (1891–1929), a Dutch biologist.

== Etymology ==
The fish was named in honor of Donald Jacob Baron Mackay (1839-1921), the then colonial administrator and governor in India; he was one of the promoters of the 1904-1905 expedition that collected the type specimen in the Dutch West Indies.

== Description ==
Torpedo mackayana has a round, "fleshy" disc, which has a slightly greater width than length. It has a gray-brown or rusty-brown upperside and a white underside. It is covered with small patches of brown or white. These patches may differ significantly in size and distribution throughout its body. It has a long, strong tail and two dorsal fins. The first dorsal fin is broad, while the second is slightly smaller and more slender. Its teeth are distributed in up to 38 rows and it has visible flaps on its nostrils. It has rounded spiracles, a feature that does not appear in any other species in the genus Torpedo.

Torpedo mackayana is a small to medium-sized ray. Its growth and size was surveyed in the Coast of Senegal from 1994 to 1998, with the results having been published in 2001. This study showed that it has an average length of about 9.55 centimetres (3.76 in) and an average weight of 20.64 grams (0.728 oz) at birth. Females typically reach sexual maturity at about 35 centimetres (14 in) and males reach it at 31.5 centimetres (12.4 in). As an adult, females are larger than males. According to the survey, the length of adult females is 35–50 centimetres (14–20 in) and the length of adult males is 31.5–38.2 centimetres (12.4–15.0 in). The largest female observed weighed 2,010 grams (71 oz) and the largest male weighed 1,255 grams (44.3 oz).

== Ecology ==
The reproductive cycle of Torpedo mackayana can take a year, and gestation can take nearly half a year. Ovulation happens in May or June, and young are born in August or September. Like other species in the genus Torpedo, the oocyte of the species is sometimes prevented from growing until birth. Females have two uteri and two ovaries. The eggs of the species, when fertilized, weigh about 8.6 grams (0.30 oz) on average, and the oocytes weigh an average of 9.2 grams (0.32 oz).

Torpedo mackayana has a coastal habitat and lives in depths of 30–50 metres (98–164 ft). It has been found in estuaries and on sea floors of mud or sand. Its prey consists of fish and smaller invertebrates. Little else is known about its biology.

== Distribution and conservation ==
Torpedo mackayana lives in tropical waters of the eastern Atlantic Ocean, in 16 countries on the western coast of Africa. The most northern part of its range is Senegal, and the most southern part is Angola. It is likely caught by fisheries as a bycatch. Pollution and habitat destruction, due to coastal development, are also threats in part of its range. However, nothing is known about its population size or trend. The adult population consists of more females than males, while young are more commonly male than female. No conservation actions are taking place for the species, and it is listed on the IUCN Red List as Endangered. According to the IUCN, further research is required of the species' population before planning conservation actions.
