= Tetronarce formosa =

Conservation status
- Near Threatened (IUCN 3.1)

Scientific classification
- Kingdom: Animalia
- Phylum: Chordata
- Class: Chondrichthyes
- Subclass: Elasmobranchii
- Order: Torpediniformes
- Family: Torpedinidae
- Genus: Tetronarce
- Species: T. formosa

Binomial name
- Tetronarce formosa (Haas and Ebert, 2006)

Species of electric ray

Tetronarce formosa, also known as the Taiwanese electric ray, is a species of electric ray in the family Torpedinidae.

== Distribution ==
The Taiwanese torpedo ray is known from coastal waters off Taiwan.
