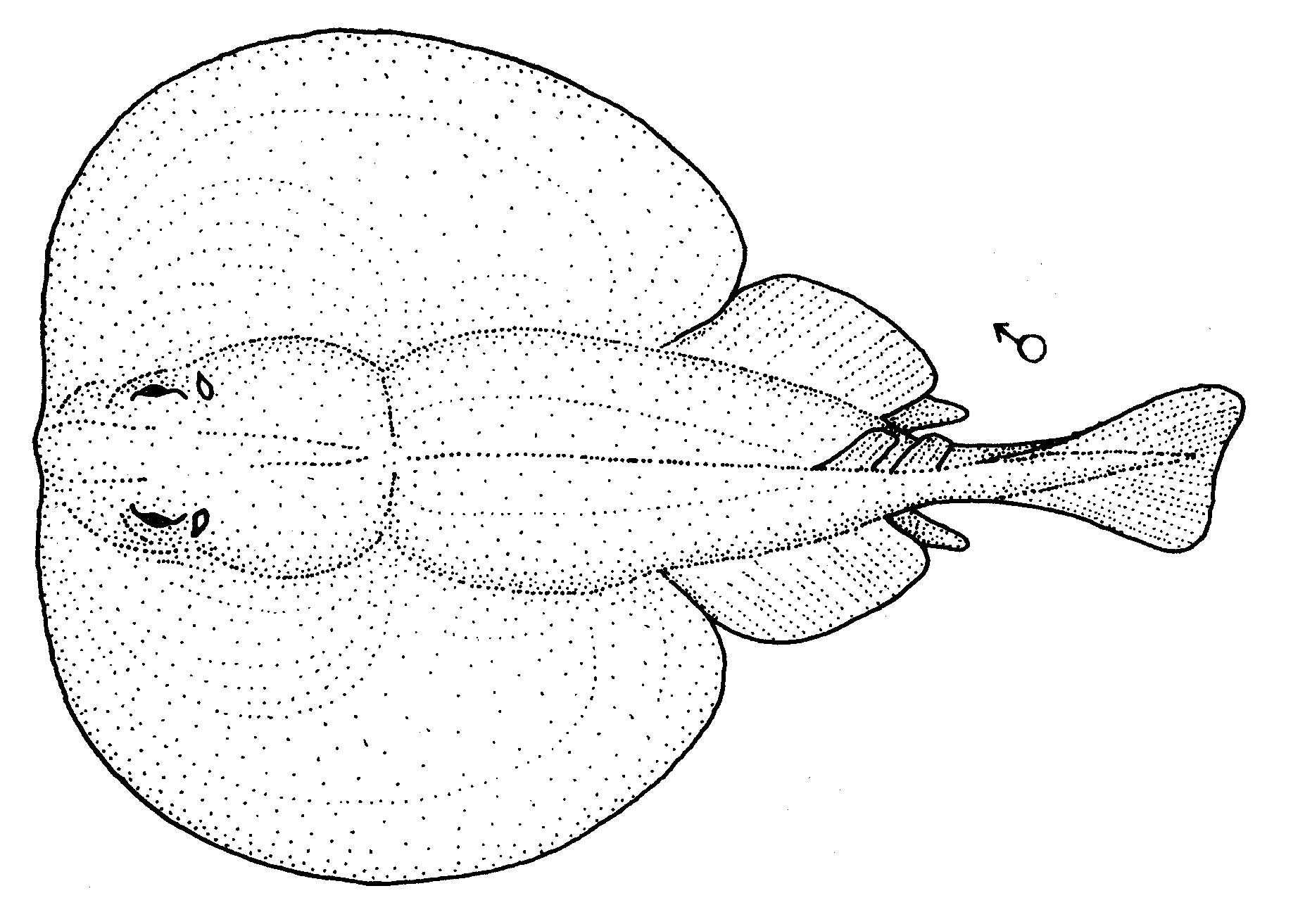
- Drawing by Dr Tony Ayling

Scientific classification
- Kingdom: Animalia
- Phylum: Chordata
- Class: Chondrichthyes
- Subclass: Elasmobranchii
- Order: Torpediniformes
- Family: Torpedinidae
- Genus: Tetronarce
- Species: T. fairchildi

Binomial name
- Tetronarce fairchildi F. W. Hutton, 1872

Synonyms
- Torpedo fairchildi Hutton, 1872

= New Zealand torpedo =

Species of cartilaginous fish

Tetronarce fairchildi, commonly known as the New Zealand torpedo, is a species of electric ray of the family Torpedinidae found only around New Zealand, at depths of between 5 and 1,100 m. This species is placed in the genus Tetronarce.

In June 2018 the New Zealand Department of Conservation classified the T. fairchildi as "Data Deficient" under the New Zealand Threat Classification System.
