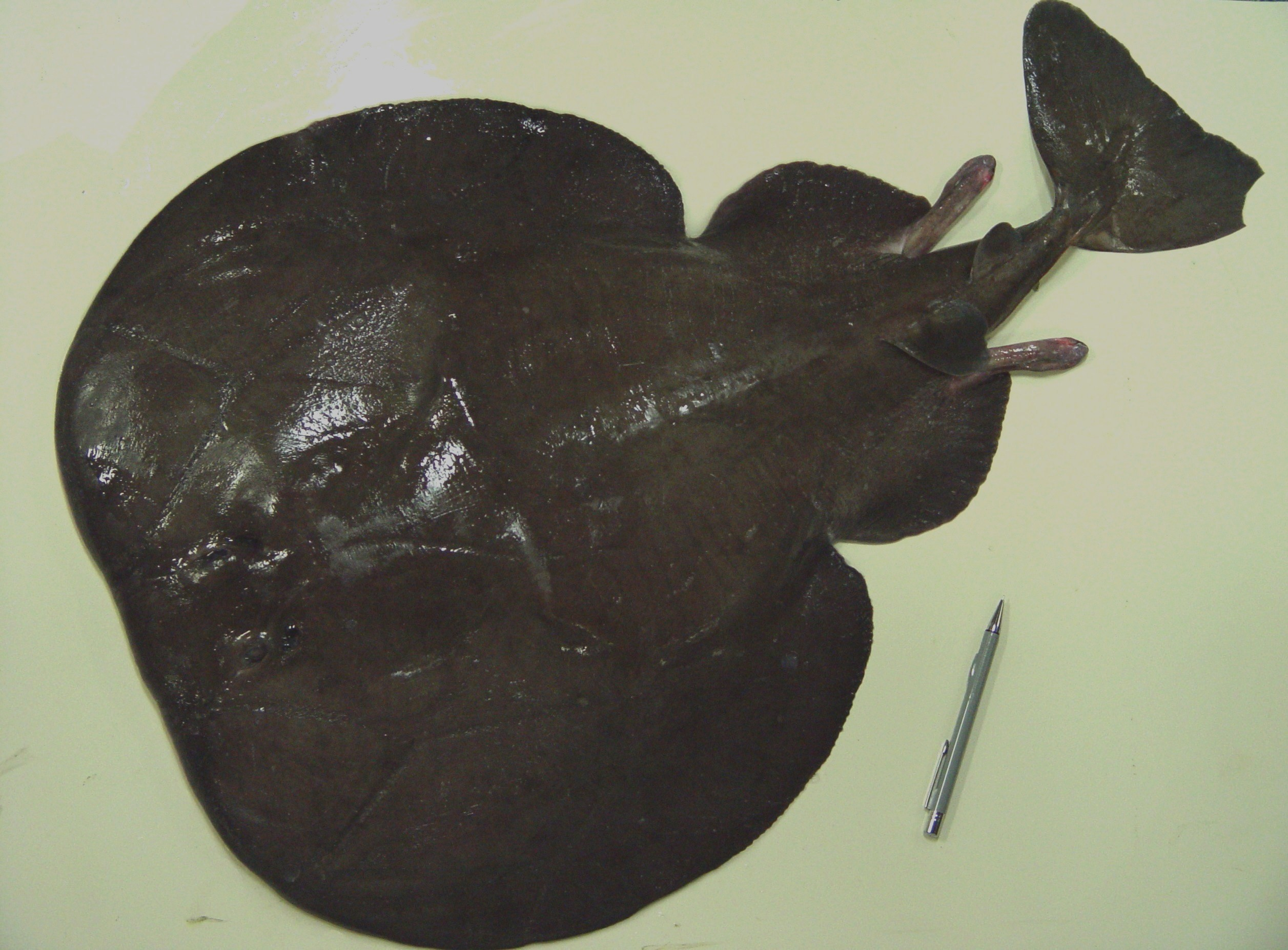
- Tetronarce nobiliana

Scientific classification
- Kingdom: Animalia
- Phylum: Chordata
- Class: Chondrichthyes
- Subclass: Elasmobranchii
- Order: Torpediniformes
- Family: Torpedinidae; Bonaparte, 1838

Genera and species
- See text

= Torpedinidae =

Torpedinidae Temporal range: Early Paleocene–present

Family of cartilaginous fishes

The family Torpedinidae contains 22 species of electric rays or torpedoes, flat cartilaginous fishes that produce electricity as a defense and feeding mechanism. They are slow-moving bottom-dwellers.

The largest species is the Atlantic torpedo, Tetronarce nobiliana, which can grow to a weight of 90 kg (200 lb) and deliver a 220-volt electric shock. Electric rays have patches of modified muscle cells called electroplaques that make up an electric organ. These generate an electric gradient, similar to the normal electric potential across most cell membranes, but amplified greatly by its concentration into a very small area. The electricity can be stored in the tissues, which act as a battery. The shock can be discharged in pulses. A ray can emit a shock into the body of a prey animal to stun it and make it easier to capture and eat, or into the body of a predator. Tissue from electric rays is often used in neurobiological research because of its unique properties.

Torpedo rays are flat like other rays, disc-shaped, with caudal fins that vary in length. Their mouths and gill slits are located on their undersides. Males have claspers near the base of the tail. Females are ovoviviparous, meaning they form eggs but do not lay them. The young emerge from the eggs within the body of the female, and she gives live birth. The young are called pups.

The naval weapon known as the torpedo was named after this genus, whose own name has the same Latin origin as the English word torpid, meaning "sluggish" or "lethargic", presumably the sensations one would feel after experiencing the ray's electric shock.

The earliest fossil member of the family is †Eotorpedo from the Early Paleocene to the Early Eocene of Europe, North Africa, and the eastern United States.

== Species ==
There are 22 species in 2 genera:

- Genus Tetronarce T. N. Gill, 1862
  - Tetronarce californica Ayres, 1855 (Pacific electric ray)
  - Tetronarce cowleyi Ebert, D. L. Haas & M. R. de Carvalho, 2015 (Cowley's torpedo ray)
  - Tetronarce fairchildi F. W. Hutton, 1872 (New Zealand torpedo)
  - Tetronarce formosa D. L. Haas & Ebert, 2006 (Taiwan torpedo)
  - Tetronarce macneilli Whitley, 1932 (Shorttail torpedo)
  - Tetronarce nobiliana Bonaparte, 1835 (Atlantic torpedo)
  - Tetronarce puelcha Lahille, 1926 (Argentine torpedo)
  - Tetronarce tokionis S. Tanaka (I), 1908 (Trapezoid torpedo)
  - Tetronarce tremens F. de Buen, 1959 (Chilean torpedo)
- Genus Torpedo Forsskål, 1775
  - Torpedo adenensis M. R. de Carvalho, Stehmann & Manilo, 2002 (Aden Gulf torpedo)
  - Torpedo alexandrinsis Mazhar, 1987 (Alexandrine torpedo)
  - Torpedo andersoni Bullis, 1962 (Florida torpedo)
  - Torpedo bauchotae Cadenat, Capapé & Desoutter, 1978 (Rosette torpedo)
  - Torpedo fuscomaculata W. K. H. Peters, 1855 (Black-spotted torpedo)
  - Torpedo mackayana Metzelaar, 1919 (Ringed torpedo)
  - Torpedo marmorata A. Risso, 1810 (Marbled electric ray)
  - Torpedo microdiscus Parin & Kotlyar, 1985 (Smalldisk torpedo)
  - Torpedo panthera Olfers, 1831 (Leopard torpedo)
  - Torpedo semipelagica Parin & Kotlyar, 1985 (Semipelagic torpedo)
  - Torpedo sinuspersici Olfers, 1831 (Variable torpedo or Gulf torpedo)
  - Torpedo suessii Steindachner, 1898
  - Torpedo torpedo (Linnaeus, 1758) (Common torpedo)
- Genus †Eotorpedo White, 1934 (fossil; Early Paleocene to Early Eocene)
  - †Eotorpedo hilgendorfi (Jaekel, 1904)
  - †Eotorpedo jaekeli White, 1934
  - †Eotorpedo nolfi Herman, 1974
  - †Eotorpedo zennaroi Cappetta, 1988
