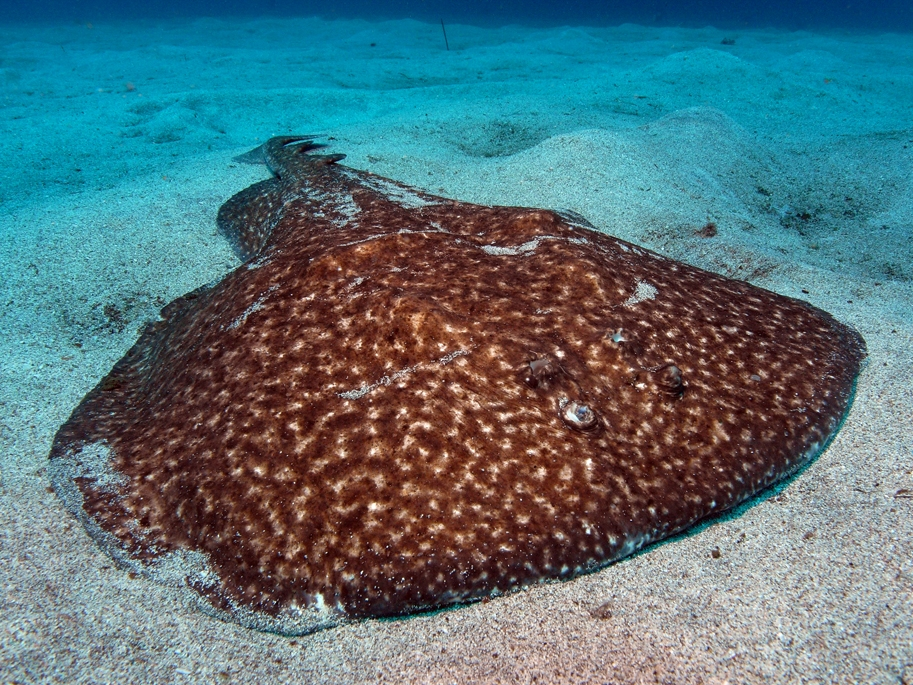

Conservation status
- Vulnerable (IUCN 3.1)

Scientific classification
- Kingdom: Animalia
- Phylum: Chordata
- Class: Chondrichthyes
- Subclass: Elasmobranchii
- Order: Torpediniformes
- Family: Torpedinidae
- Genus: Torpedo
- Species: T. marmorata

Binomial name
- Torpedo marmorata A. Risso, 1810
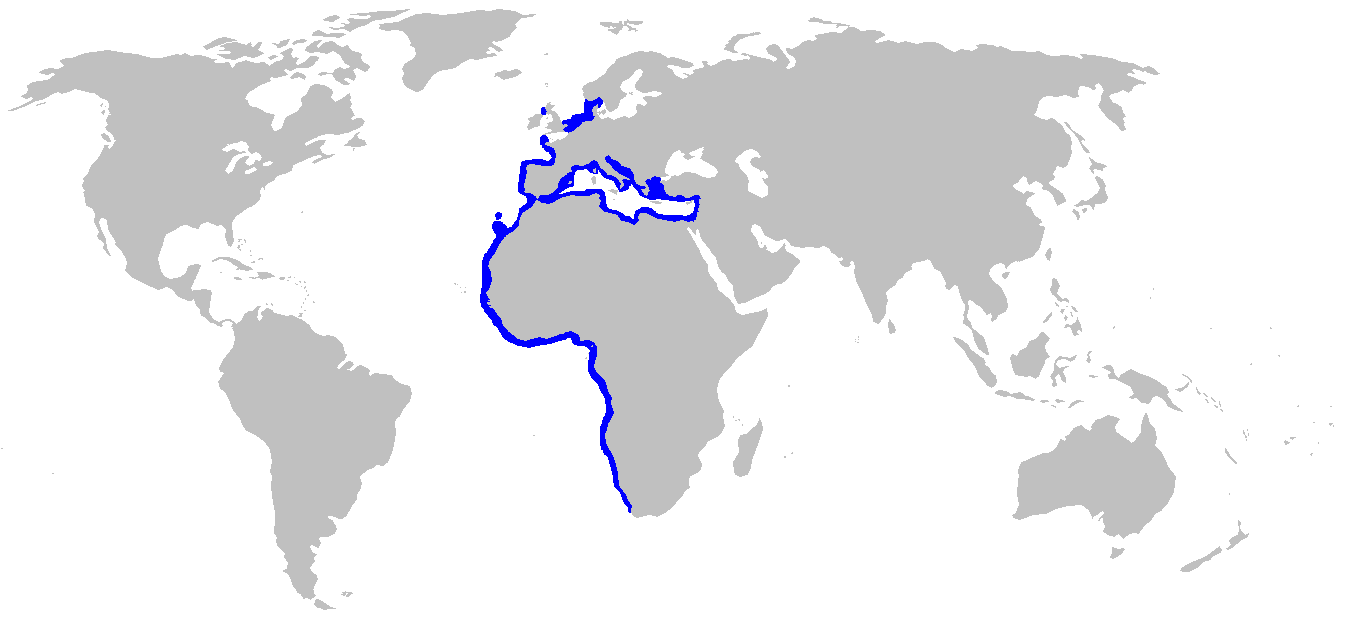
- Range of the marbled electric ray

Synonyms
- Torpedo diversicolor Davy, 1834; Torpedo galvani Risso, 1810; Torpedo immaculata Rafinesque, 1810; Torpedo picta Lowe, 1843; Torpedo punctata Rafinesque, 1810; Torpedo trepidans Valenciennes, 1843; Torpedo vulgaris Fleming, 1828

= Marbled electric ray =

Species of cartilaginous fish

The marbled electric ray (Torpedo marmorata) is a species of electric ray in the family Torpedinidae found in the coastal waters of the eastern Atlantic Ocean from the North Sea to South Africa. This benthic fish inhabits rocky reefs, seagrass beds, and sandy and muddy flats in shallow to moderately deep waters. It can survive in environments with very little dissolved oxygen, such as tidal pools. The marbled electric ray has a nearly circular pectoral fin disc and a muscular tail that bears two dorsal fins of nearly equal size and a large caudal fin. It can be identified by the long, finger-like projections on the rims of its spiracles, as well as by its dark brown mottled color pattern, though some individuals are plain-colored. Males and females typically reach 36–38 cm (14–15 in) and 55–61 cm (22–24 in) long respectively.

Nocturnal and solitary, the marbled electric ray can often be found lying the sea floor buried except for its eyes and spiracles. This slow-moving predator feeds almost exclusively on small bony fishes, which it ambushes from the bottom and subdues with strong electric bursts. It defends itself by turning towards the threat, swimming in a loop, or curling up with its underside facing outward, while emitting electric shocks to drive off the prospective predator. Its paired electric organs are capable of producing 70–80 volts of electricity. This species is aplacental viviparous, with the developing embryos sustained by yolk and histotroph ("uterine milk") produced by the mother. Mating takes place from November to January, and females bear litters of 3–32 pups every other year after a gestation period of 9–12 months. The newborn ray is immediately capable of using electricity to hunt.

The electric shock delivered by a marbled electric ray can be severe but is not directly life-threatening. Its electrogenic properties have been known since classical antiquity, when live rays were used to treat conditions such as chronic headaches. This and other electric ray species are used as model organisms in biomedical research. Various coastal demersal fisheries take the marbled electric ray as bycatch; captured rays are usually discarded as they have little commercial value. The impact of fishing on its population is uncertain, and thus International Union for Conservation of Nature (IUCN) has listed this ray as Vulnerable. In the Mediterranean Sea, it remains the most common electric ray and in some areas may be increasing in number.

== Taxonomy ==
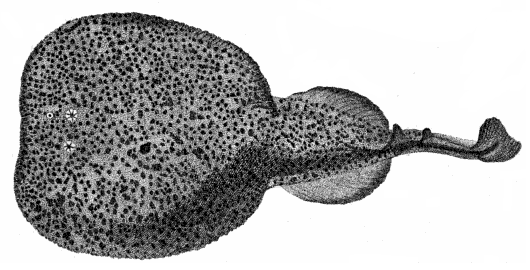
Risso's illustration of the marbled electric ray, accompanying his original species description.

French naturalist Antoine Risso described the marbled electric ray as Torpedo marmorata in his 1810 Ichtyologie de Nice, ou histoire naturelle des poissons du département des Alpes maritimes (Ichthyology of Nice, or natural history of fishes in the Alpes-Maritimes). The specific epithet marmorata means "marbled" in Latin, and refers to the ray's color pattern. Because no type specimens are known, in 1999 Ronald Fricke designated Risso's original illustration as the species lectotype.

Within the genus Torpedo, the marbled electric ray belongs to the subgenus Torpedo, which differs from the other subgenus Tetronarce in having fringed margins on their spiracles and generally ornate dorsal coloration. Other common names for this species include common crampfish, marbled torpedo, numbfish, and spotted torpedo.

== Distribution and habitat ==
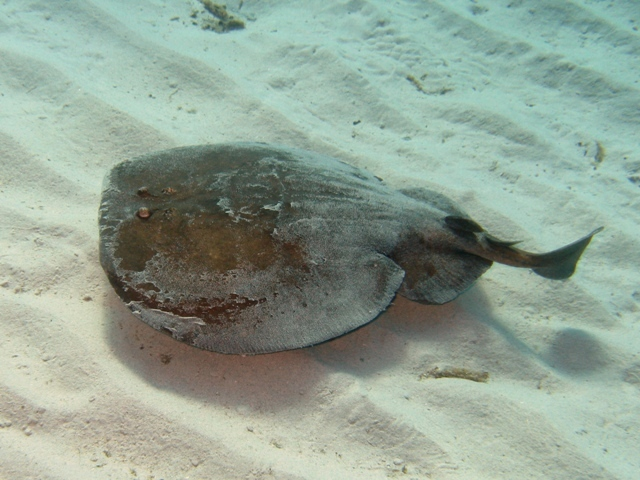
Sandy flats are one of the habitats occupied by the marbled electric ray.

Widely distributed in the eastern Atlantic Ocean, the marbled electric ray is found from Scotland and the southern North Sea southward to the Cape of Good Hope, and north at least as far as Durban, likely further. South Africa. In addition it is present in the Mediterranean Sea, with higher densities in western areas. It prefers temperatures cooler than 20 °C (68 °F). This species is typically found at depths of 10–30 m (33–98 ft) off Britain and Ireland, 20–100 m (66–328 ft) off Italy, and down to 200 m (660 ft) off Tunisia. It has been recorded from as deep as 370 m (1,210 ft). The marbled electric ray tends to be found deeper than the common torpedo (T. torpedo), which shares the southern portion of its range.

Bottom-dwelling in nature, the marbled electric ray inhabits rocky reefs and seagrass beds, as well as nearby areas with sandy or muddy bottoms. During warm summer months, pregnant females are known to migrate into Arcachon Bay in northwestern France, where they are commonly found in very shallow, muddy pools near oyster beds. This species may conduct a northward migration in summer and autumn, into the waters of the British Isles.

== Description ==
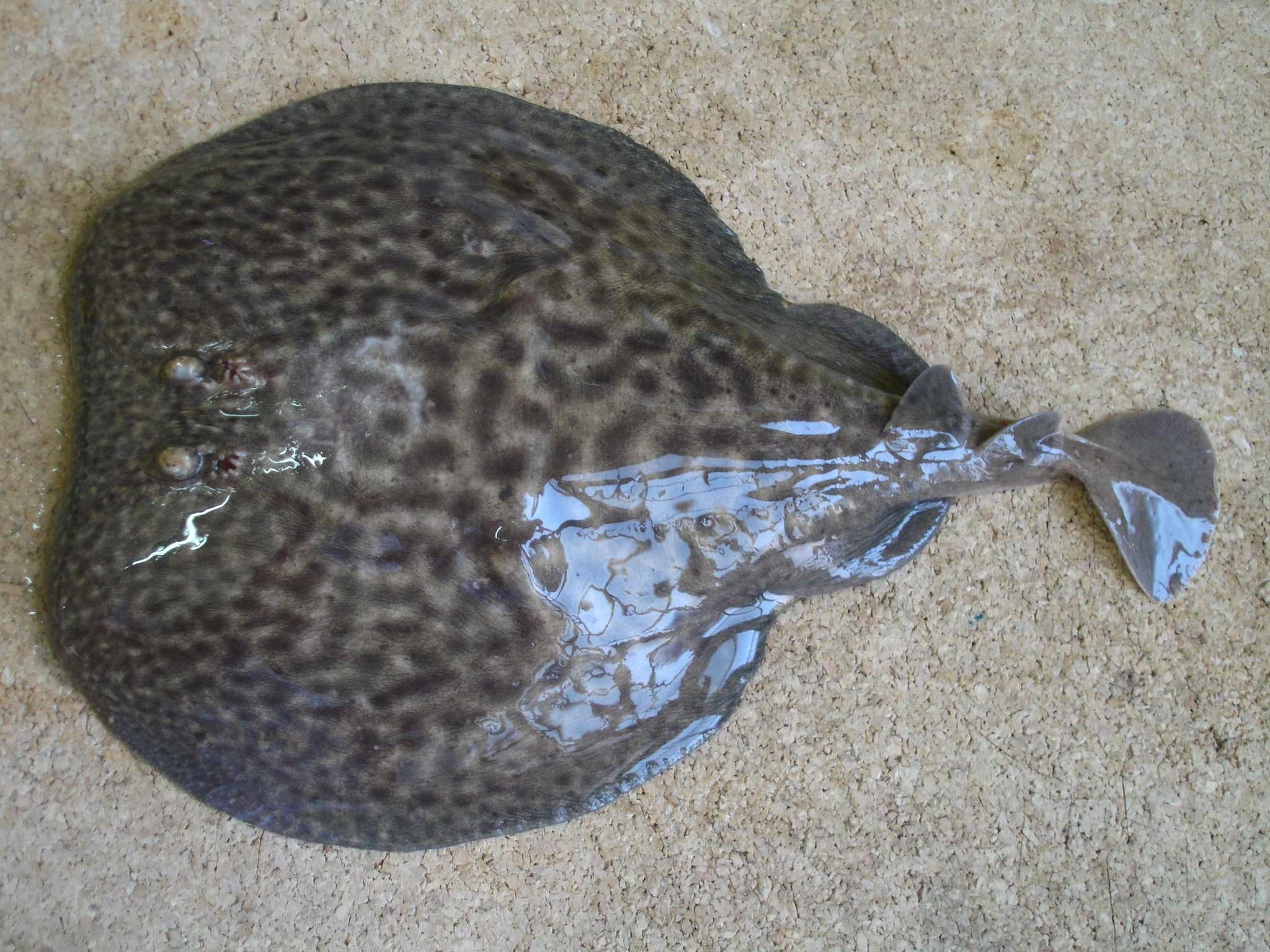
The marbled electric ray can be identified by its ornate color pattern and fringed spiracles.

The body of the marbled electric ray is soft and flabby, and entirely lacks dermal denticles. The thick pectoral fin disc is nearly circular and comprises about 59–67% of the total length; the paired kidney-shaped electric organs are visible beneath the skin, outside of the small eyes. Immediately posterior to each eye is a large, oval spiracle, which bears 6–8 long, finger-like projections on the rim that almost meet at the center. On the "nape" behind the spiracles, there are 5–7 prominent mucous pores. Between the nostrils, there is a quadrangular curtain of skin much broader than long, that almost reaches the small, arched mouth. The teeth are small with a single pointed cusp, and are arranged with a quincunx pattern into a pavement-like band in either jaw. The five pairs of gill slits are small and located beneath the disc.

The two dorsal fins have rounded apexes and are placed close together; the base of each fin measures about two-thirds its height. The rear of the first dorsal fin base is located behind the rear of the pelvic fin bases. The second dorsal fin is only slightly smaller than the first. The short, robust tail has skin folds running along either side, and terminates in a large caudal fin shaped like a triangle with blunt corners. The upper surface has a dark mottled pattern on a light to dark brown background; some individuals are uniformly brown. The underside is plain off-white with darker fin margins. This species can grow up to 1 m (3.3 ft) long, though few exceed 36–38 cm (14–15 in) long for males and 55–61 cm (22–24 in) long for females. The much larger sizes attained by females can be attributed to the resource investment needed for reproduction. There seems to be little geographic variation in maximum size. The maximum weight on record is 3 kg (6.6 lb).

== Biology and ecology ==
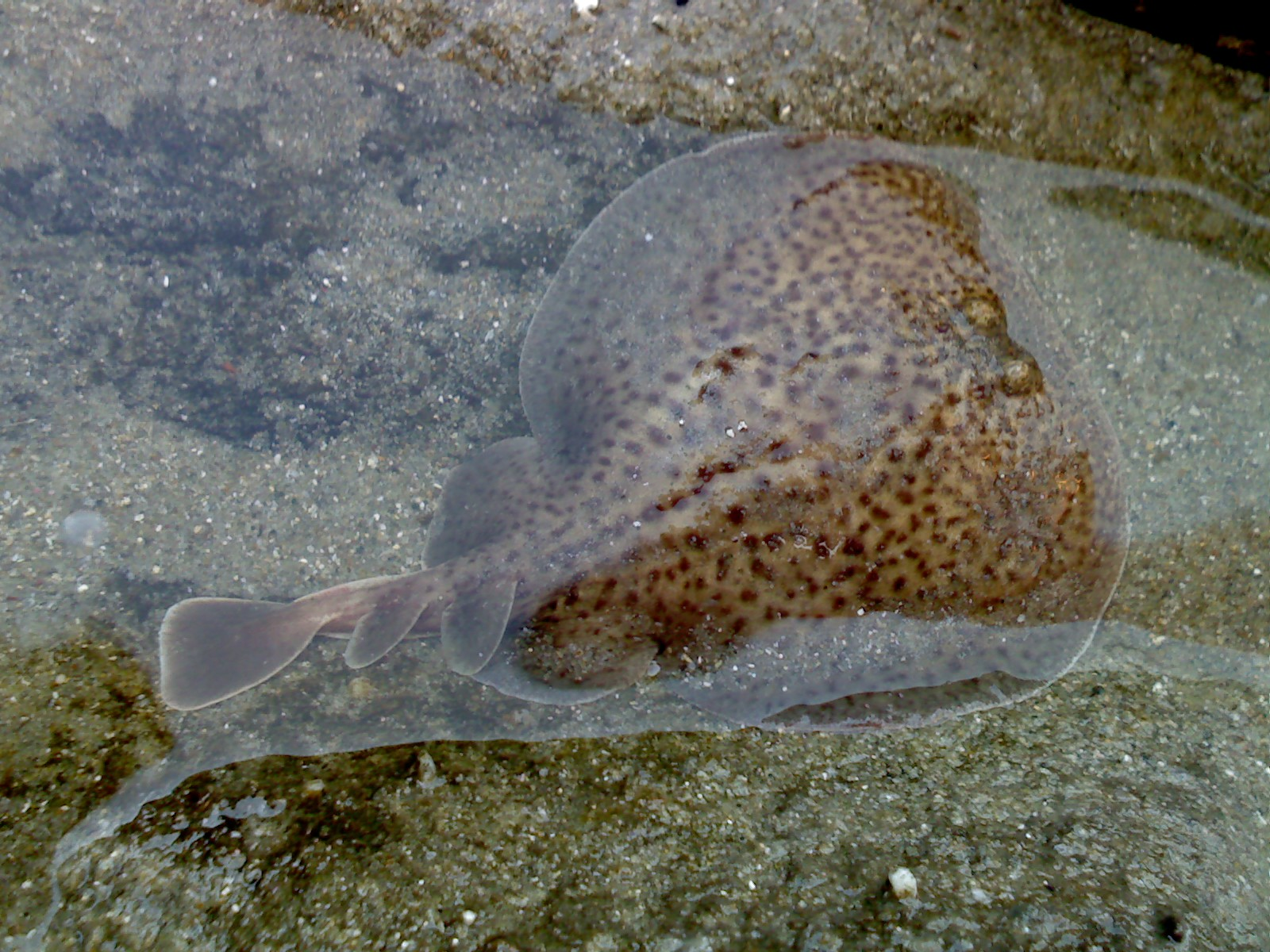
The marbled electric ray can survive in environments with very little oxygen, such as tidal pools.

Solitary and slow-moving, the marbled electric ray may remain motionless for several days at a time. It is more active at night and spends much of the day buried in sediment with only the eyes and spiracles showing. Consistent with its sluggish nature, the marbled electric ray has a low blood oxygen carrying capacity and heart rate (10–15 beats/min), and consumes less oxygen than other sharks and rays of similar size. It is highly tolerant of being deprived of oxygen (hypoxia), allowing it to cope with deoxygenated bottom waters or being stranded in small pools by the falling tide. The ray stops breathing entirely when the oxygen partial pressure in the water drops below 10–15 Torr, and can survive such a state for at least five hours. It deals with extreme hypoxia by coupling anaerobic glycolysis to additional energy-producing pathways in its mitochondria, which serves to slow down the accumulation of potentially harmful lactate within its cells.

Like other members of its family, the marbled electric ray can produce a strong electric shock for attack and defense, produced by a pair of electric organs derived from muscle tissue. Each electric organ consists of 400–600 vertical columns, with each column composed of a stack of roughly 400 jelly-filled "electroplates" that essentially act like a battery. This ray has been measured producing up to 70–80 volts, and the maximum potential of the electric discharge has been estimated to be as high as 200 volts. The strength of the electric shock declines progressively as the ray becomes fatigued. Experiments in vitro have found that the nerves innervating the electric organ essentially stop functioning at temperatures below 15 °C (59 °F). As the water temperature in the wild regularly drops below this threshold in winter, it is possible that the ray does not use its electric organ for part of the year. Alternately, the ray may have a yet-unknown physiological mechanism to adapt electric organ function to the cold.

Known parasites of the marbled electric ray include the tapeworms Anthocephalum gracile and Calyptrobothrium riggii, the leeches Pontobdella muricata and Trachelobdella lubrica, the monogeneans Amphibdella torpedinis, Amphibdelloides kechemiraen, A. maccallumi, A. vallei, Empruthotrema raiae, E. torpedinis, and Squalonchocotyle torpedinis, and the nematodes Ascaris torpedinis and Mawsonascaris pastinacae.

=== Feeding ===
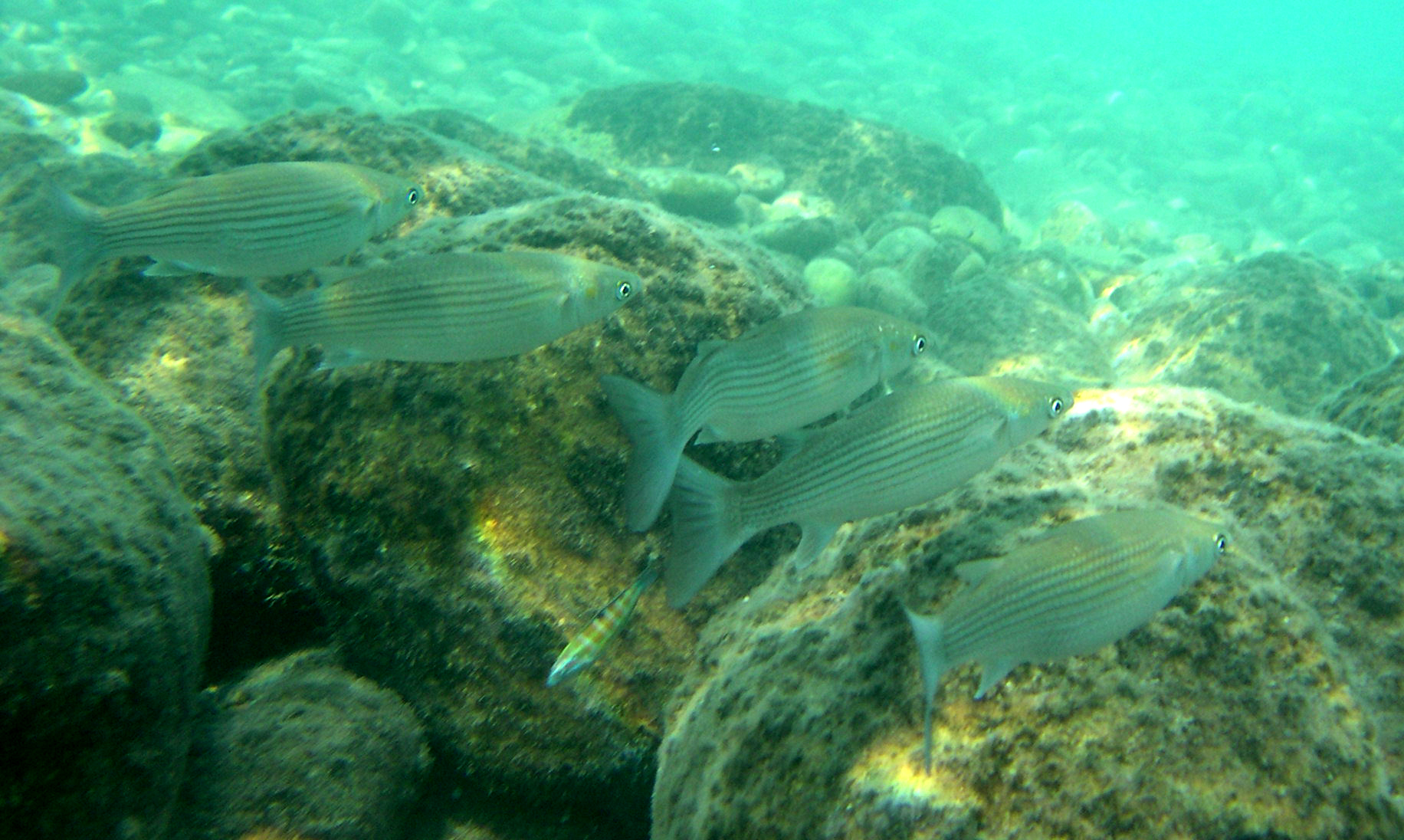
Leaping mullet are an important prey of the marbled electric ray.

The marbled electric ray is an ambush predator that employs electricity to capture prey. Vision is of little importance in hunting, as the ray's eyes are often obscured as it lies buried on the bottom. Instead, it likely relies on the mechanoreceptors of its lateral line, as it only attacks moving prey. The electroreceptive ampullae of Lorenzini may also contribute to prey detection.

Small, benthic bony fishes constitute over 90% of the marbled electric ray's diet by weight; these include gobies, hake, sea bass, mullets, jack mackerel, sea breams, goatfish, damselfish, wrasses, conger eels, and flatfish. Cephalopods such as European squid (Loligo vulgaris) and elegant cuttlefish (Sepia elegans) are a minor secondary food source. There is a single record of an individual that had swallowed a penaeid prawn, Penaeus kerathurus, and a study of captive rays found that they reject live Macropodia crabs. Off southern France, by far the most important prey species is the leaping mullet (Liza saliens). Food items are swallowed whole; there is a record of a ray 41 cm (16 in) long that had consumed a three-bearded rockling (Gaidropsarus vulgaris) 34 cm (13 in) long.

Two distinct types of prey capture behavior have been observed in the marbled electric ray. The first is "jumping", used by the ray to attack prey fish that swim close to its head, typically no farther than 4 cm (1.6 in). In the "jump", the ray pulls back its head and then thrusts its disc upwards, reaching about two or three times as high as the prey fish is from the bottom. Simultaneously, it makes a single tail stroke and produces a high-frequency (230–430 Hz, increasing with temperature) burst of electricity. The initial electric burst is very short, containing only 10–64 pulses, but is still strong enough to cause tetanic contraction in the body of the prey fish, often breaking its vertebral column. As the ray glides forward, the motion of the jump sweeps the now-paralyzed prey beneath it, whereupon it is enveloped by the disc and maneuvered to the mouth. Electric bursts continues to be produced during this process; the total number of electric pulses over a single jump increases with size, ranging from 66 in a newborn 12 cm (4.7 in) long to 340 in an adult 45 cm (18 in) long. The jump lasts no more than two seconds.

The second type of prey capture behavior is "creeping", used by the ray for stationary or slow-moving prey; this includes stunned prey that may have drifted out of reach from a jumping attack. In creeping, the ray makes small up and down motions of its disc coupled with small beats of its tail. The raising of the disc draws water beneath it and pulls the prey towards the ray, while the lowering of the disc and the tail beats move the ray towards the prey in small increments. When it reaches the prey, the ray opens its mouth to suck it in. Short electric bursts are produced as necessary, depending on the movement of the prey, and continue through ingestion.

=== Defense ===
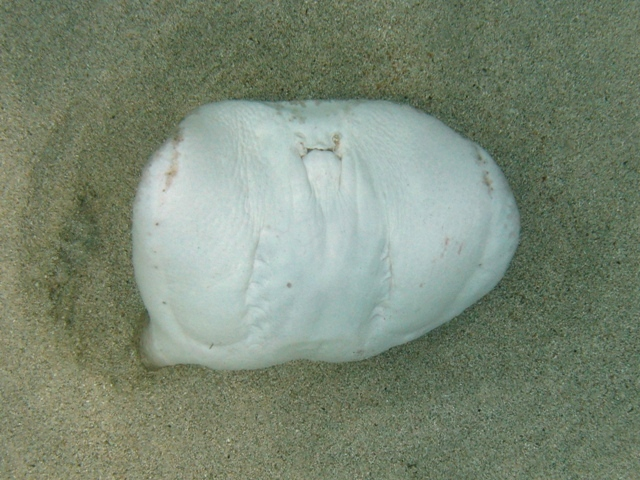
When threatened, the marbled electric ray adopts a defensive posture that facilitates the delivery of electric shocks.

Because of its size and electrical defenses, the marbled electric ray does not often fall prey to other animals such as sharks. This species exhibits different defensive behaviors depending on whether a prospective predator grasps it by the disc or the tail. A ray touched on the disc will quickly turn toward the threat while producing electric shocks; this is followed by it fleeing in a straight line, after which it may re-bury itself. A ray touched on the tail will propel itself upward into a loop; if it has not escaped after the maneuver, the ray will curl into a ring with the belly facing outward, so as to present the area of its body with the highest electric field gradient (the underside of the electric organs) towards the threat; these behaviors are accompanied by short, strong electric shocks. The ray tends to produce more electric bursts when protecting its tail than when protecting its disc.

=== Life history ===
The marbled electric ray exhibits aplacental viviparity, in which the developing embryos are nourished initially by yolk, which is later supplemented by nutrient-rich histotroph ("uterine milk") produced by the mother. Adult females have two functional ovaries and uteruses; the inner lining of the uterus bears a series of parallel lengthwise folds. The reproductive cycle for females is probably biennial, while males are capable of mating every year. Mating occurs from November to January, and the young are born the following year after a gestation period of 9–12 months. The litter size ranges from 3 to 32, increasing with the size of the female.

The electric organs first appear when the embryo is 1.9–2.3 cm (0.75–0.91 in) long, at which time it has distinct eyes, pectoral and pelvic fins, and external gills. At an embryonic length of 2.0–2.7 mm (0.079–0.106 in), the gill clefts close dorsally, leaving the gill slits beneath the disc as in all rays. At the same time, the four blocks of primordial cells that make up each electric organ rapidly coalesce together. The embryo's pectoral fins enlarge and fuse with the snout at a length of 2.8–3.7 cm (1.1–1.5 in), giving it the typical circular electric ray shape. When the embryo is 3.5–5.5 cm (1.4–2.2 in) long, the external gills are resorbed and pigmentation develops. The embryo can produce electric discharges by a length of 6.6–7.3 cm (2.6–2.9 in). The strength of the discharge increases by a magnitude of 10^{5} over the course of gestation, reaching 47–55 volts by an embryonic length of 8.6–13 cm (3.4–5.1 in), close to that of an adult.

Newborns measure approximately 10–14 cm (3.9–5.5 in) long, and are immediately capable of performing characteristic predatory and defensive behaviors. Males mature sexually at approximately 21–29 cm (8.3–11.4 in) long and five years of age, while females mature significantly larger and older at 31–39 cm (12–15 in) long and twelve years of age. The maximum lifespan is 12–13 years for males and around 20 years for females.

== Human interactions ==
The shock delivered by the marbled electric ray can be painful but is seldom life-threatening, although there is a danger of a shocked diver becoming disoriented underwater. Its electrogenic properties have been known since classical antiquity, leading it and other electric fishes to be used in medicine. The ancient Greeks and Romans applied live rays to those afflicted with conditions such as chronic headaches and gout, and recommended that its meat be eaten by epileptics.

The marbled electric ray is caught incidentally in bottom trawls, trammel nets, and bottom longlines; it has little economic value and is mostly discarded at sea when captured. The International Union for Conservation of Nature (IUCN) assesses it as Vulnerable. At least in the northern Mediterranean, surveys have found that it remains the most common electric ray, and is perhaps becoming more abundant in Italian waters. This and other electric ray species are used as model organisms in biomedical research because their electric organs are rich in acetylcholine receptors, which play an important role in the human nervous system.
