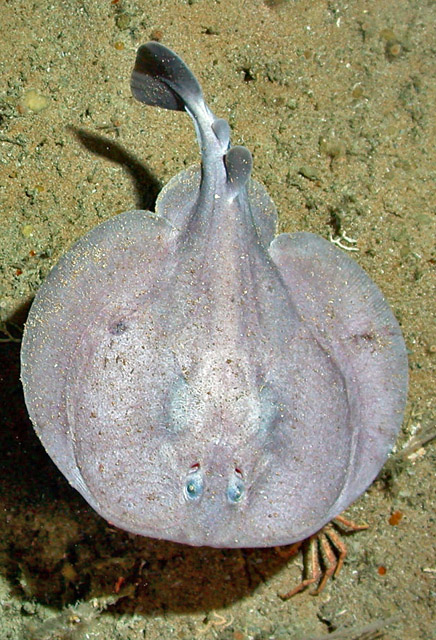

Conservation status
- Least Concern (IUCN 3.1)

Scientific classification
- Kingdom: Animalia
- Phylum: Chordata
- Class: Chondrichthyes
- Subclass: Elasmobranchii
- Order: Torpediniformes
- Family: Torpedinidae
- Genus: Tetronarce
- Species: T. nobiliana

Binomial name
- Tetronarce nobiliana Bonaparte, 1835
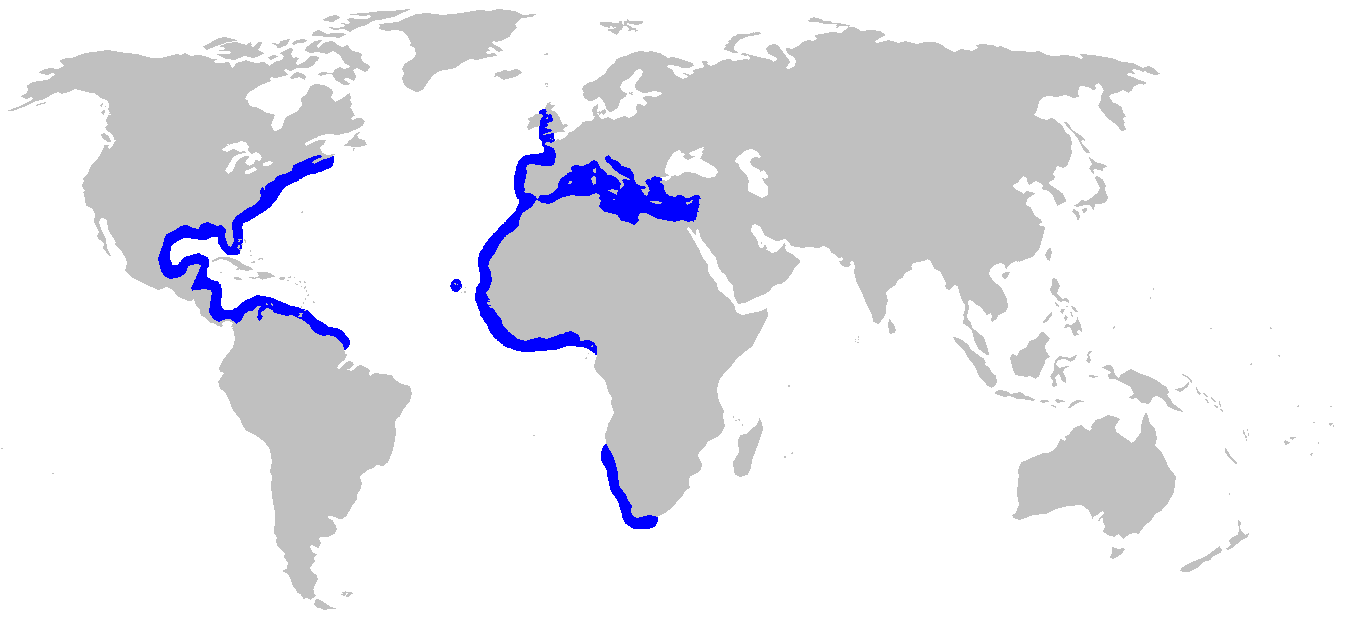
- Range of the Atlantic torpedo

Synonyms
- Torpedo emarginata M'Coy, 1841; Torpedo hebetans Lowe, 1838; Torpedo nigra Guichenot, 1850; Torpedo nobiliana Bonaparte, 1835; Torpedo occidentalis Storer, 1843; Torpedo walshii Thompson, 1856

= Atlantic torpedo =

Species of cartilaginous fish

The Atlantic torpedo (Tetronarce nobiliana) is a species of electric ray in the family Torpedinidae. It is found in the Atlantic Ocean, from Nova Scotia to Brazil in the west and from Scotland to West Africa and off southern Africa in the east, occurring at depths of up to 800 m (2,600 ft), and in the Mediterranean Sea. Younger individuals generally inhabit shallower, sandy or muddy habitats, whereas adults are more pelagic in nature and frequent open water.

Weighing up to 90 kg (200 lb), with a length of 1.8 m (6 ft), the Atlantic torpedo is the largest known electric ray. Like other members of its genus, it has an almost circular pectoral fin disk with a nearly straight leading margin, and a robust tail with a large triangular caudal fin. Distinctive characteristics include its uniform dark color, smooth-rimmed spiracles (paired respiratory openings behind the eyes), and two dorsal fins of unequal size. Its diet consists mainly of bony fish, though it also feeds on small sharks and crustaceans.

An aplacental viviparous species, females give live birth to up to 60 young following a gestation period of one year. During gestation, the developing embryos are nourished by yolk and then by maternally produced histotroph ("uterine milk").

Solitary and nocturnal, the Atlantic torpedo is capable of generating up to 220 volts of electricity to subdue its prey or defend itself against predators. For a humans, this electric shock is severe and painful, although usually not fatal.

The Atlantic torpedo, with its electrogenic properties, was used in medicine by the Ancient Greeks and Romans and became the namesake of the naval weapon. Prior to the 19th century, its liver oil was used as lamp fuel, but it is no longer of any economic value. The International Union for Conservation of Nature (IUCN) has listed this species as Least Concern; it is caught unintentionally by commercial and recreational fishers, but the impact of these activities on its population is unknown.

== Taxonomy ==
The first scientific description of the Atlantic torpedo was published in 1835 by French naturalist Charles Lucien Bonaparte, in his principal work Iconografia della Fauna Italica. Sixteen specimens were designated as the syntypes. The assignment of the southern African "great torpedo" to this species is provisional. Another type of electric ray found in the Indian Ocean off Mozambique may also belong to T. nobiliana. The Atlantic torpedo is placed in the genus Tetronarce, which differs from the other genus in the family Torpedinidae, Torpedo, in having generally plain coloration and smooth-margined spiracles. Other common names include Atlantic electric ray, Atlantic New British torpedo, black torpedo, crampfish, electric ray, numbfish, or torpedo.

== Description ==
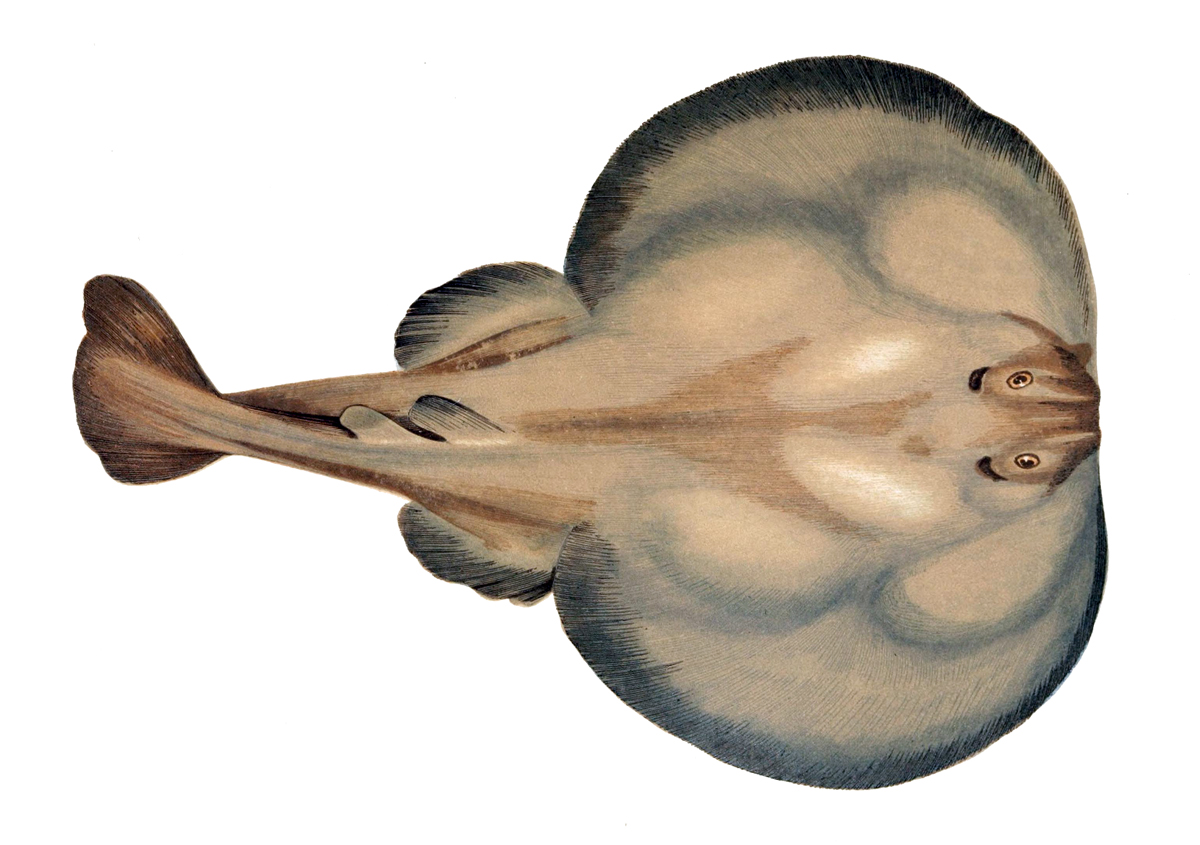
Early illustration of an Atlantic torpedo; the outlines of the electric organs are visible outside of the eyes.

The Atlantic torpedo has a nearly circular pectoral fin disc 1.2 times as wide as it is long, with a thick and nearly straight front margin. The eyes are small and are followed by much larger spiracles, which do not have papillae on their inner rims. The nostrils are close to the mouth; there is a flap of skin between them three times as wide as long, with a sinuous rear margin. The mouth is wide and arched, with prominent furrows at the corners. The teeth are pointed and increase in number with age, ranging from 38 rows in juveniles to 66 rows in adults; the first several series of teeth are functional. The gill slits are small, with the first and fifth pairs shorter than the others.

The pelvic fins are rounded and slightly overlapped by the disc at the front. The first dorsal fin is triangular with a rounded apex, originating in front of the pelvic fin insertions. The second dorsal fin is only one-half to two-thirds as large as the first; the distance between the dorsal fins is less than the length of the first dorsal fin base. The stout tail comprises about one-third of the total length, terminating in a caudal fin shaped like an equilateral triangle with slightly convex margins. The skin is soft and completely devoid of dermal denticles (scales). The dorsal coloration is a plain dark brown to gray, sometimes with a few diffuse spots, and darkening at the fin margins. The underside is white, with dark fin margins. The largest of the electric rays, the Atlantic torpedo can measure 1.8 m (6 ft) long and weigh 90 kg (200 lb). However, a length of 0.6–1.5 m (2.0–4.9 ft) and weight of 30 lb (14 kg) is more typical. Females attain a larger size than males.

== Distribution and habitat ==
The Atlantic torpedo is widely distributed in cool waters on both sides of the Atlantic Ocean. In the east, it is found from northern Scotland to the Gulf of Guinea, including the entire Mediterranean Sea (but not the Black Sea), the Azores, and Madeira, as well as from Namibia to western South Africa. In the west, it occurs from southern Nova Scotia to Venezuela and Brazil. It is rare in the North Sea and the Mediterranean and south of North Carolina. The genus Tetronarce is represented by a single species in the Mediterranean Sea, easy to identify with its characteristic dark blue pattern.

Juvenile Atlantic torpedoes are primarily bottom-dwelling and usually found at depths of 10–50 m (33–164 ft) over sandy or muddy flats, or near coral reefs. As they mature, they become more pelagic in habits, and adults are often encountered swimming in the open ocean. This species has been recorded from the surface to a depth of 800 m (2,600 ft); in the Mediterranean, it is most common at depths of 200–500 m (660–1,640 ft). It is said to make long migratory movements.

== Biology and ecology ==
Like other members of its family, the Atlantic torpedo is capable of generating a powerful electric shock from a pair of kidney-shaped electric organs in its disc, for both attack and defense. These organs comprise one-sixth of the ray's total weight and contain around half a million jelly-filled "electric plates" arranged in an average of 1,025–1,083 vertical hexagonal columns (visible beneath the skin). These columns essentially act as batteries connected in series, enabling a large Atlantic torpedo to produce up to a kilowatt of electricity at 170–220 volts, provided that it is well-fed and rested. The discharges from the electric organ occur in a series, or train, of closely spaced pulses each lasting around 0.03 seconds. Trains contain on average 12 pulses, but trains of over 100 pulses have been recorded. The ray regularly emits pulses even without an obvious external stimulus.

Solitary in nature, the Atlantic torpedo is often seen resting on or half-buried in the substrate during the day, becoming more active at night. Large and well-defended from attack, it seldom falls prey to other animals. Known parasites of the Atlantic torpedo include the tapeworms Calyptrobothrium occidentale and C. minus, Grillotia microthrix, Monorygma sp., and Phyllobothrium gracile, the monogeneans Amphibdella flabolineata and Amphibdelloides maccallumi, and the copepod Eudactylina rachelae. Some accounts suggest that this ray may be able to survive out of water for up to a day.

=== Feeding ===
The diet of the Atlantic torpedo consists mainly of bony fishes, including flatfishes, salmon, eels, and mullet, though it has also been known to take small catsharks and crustaceans. Captive rays have been observed lying still on the bottom and "pouncing" on fish that pass in front of them. At the moment of contact, the ray traps the prey against its body or the bottom by curling its pectoral fin disc around it, while delivering strong electric shocks. This strategy allows the sluggish ray to capture relatively fast-moving fish. Once subdued, the prey is maneuvered to the mouth with rippling motions of the disc and swallowed whole, head-first. The ray's highly distensible jaws allow surprisingly large prey to be ingested: an intact salmon weighing 2 kg (4 lb) has been found in the stomach of one individual, and another contained a summer flounder (Paralichthys dentatus) 37 cm (15 in) long. This ray has been known to kill fish much larger than it can eat.

=== Life history ===
The Atlantic torpedo is aplacental viviparous: the developing embryos are sustained by yolk, which is later supplemented by protein and fat-enriched histotroph ("uterine milk") produced by the mother. Females have two functional ovaries and uteruses, and a possibly biennial reproductive cycle. After a year-long gestation period, females bear up to 60 pups during the summer; the litter size increases with the size of the female. When the embryo is 14 cm (5.5 in) long, it has a pair of deep notches at the front of the disc marking the origin of the pectoral fins, and the curtain of skin between the nostrils has not yet developed; on the other hand, the eyes, spiracles, dorsal fins, and tail have reached adult proportions. Newborn rays measure 17–25 cm (6.7–9.8 in) long, and still have the anterior notches in the disc. Males and females reach sexual maturity at lengths of 55 cm (22 in) and 90 cm (35 in) respectively.

== Human interactions ==
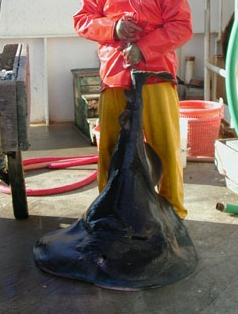
The Atlantic torpedo is caught as bycatch but not utilized.

Though seldom life-threatening, the electric discharge of an Atlantic torpedo is quite severe and may be enough to knock a person unconscious. However, a greater danger to divers is the disorientation that follows the shock. The Atlantic torpedo is of no commercial value, as its meat is flabby and tasteless. It is caught incidentally by commercial and recreational fisheries in bottom trawls and on hook-and-line. When caught at sea, it is generally discarded or cut up for bait. The International Union for Conservation of Nature (IUCN) assesses the Atlantic torpedo as Least Concern; it could be negatively affected by fishing mortality, though specific data on catch rates and population trends are lacking, as well as by the degradation of coral reefs that are important to juveniles. Its slow reproductive rate would limit its capacity to recover from population depletion.

Various electric fishes, including the Atlantic torpedo, were used in medicine during the classical era. In the 1st century, Roman physician Scribonius Largus wrote of the application of live "dark torpedo" to patients afflicted with gout or chronic headaches. In 1800, the Atlantic torpedo became the namesake for the naval weapon when American inventor Robert Fulton began using the word "torpedo" to describe bombs that submarines could attach to ships (although these early devices were more akin to modern-day mines). Before the widespread introduction of kerosene in the 19th century, the liver oil of this species was regarded as of equal quality to sperm whale (Physeter macrocephalus) oil for use in lamps. Before the 1950s, its oil was also used in small quantities by fishermen in the United States as a treatment for muscle and stomach cramps, as well as to lubricate farm machinery. Along with several other species of electric rays, the Atlantic torpedo is used as a model organism in biomedical research because its electric organs are rich in acetylcholine receptor proteins. These proteins play an important role in mediating many neurological processes, such as those involved in the functioning of anesthesia.
