= Fernando Lahille =

Argentinian naturalist

Fernando Lahille (Fernand Lahille, born August 18, 1861, in Rouen, died July 30, 1940, French-Argentine scientist, ichthyologist and tunicate specialist. Lahille studied science and medicine at the University of Paris, receiving his doctorate in 1891 while publishing extensively.

When in 1893 the Natural History Museum of La Plata in Argentina sought a scientist to head the newly formed zoology department, they found him in Lahille, already with eight years of experience in the marine laboratories of Banyuls-sur-mer and Roscoff, and sixty published works with the thesis on tunicate taxonomy (Recherches sur les tuniciers) being the most ground-breaking. During six years at the museum in Argentina (1893~1898), Lahille created a marine research station on the edge of Mar del Plata and initiated scientific studies of the continental shelf off Argentina. He also participated in two research trips to investigate the natural resources along the Patagonian coastline.

Lahille subsequently became head of the Fish and Game Department within the Argentine Ministry of Agriculture, where he became involved in new fields of biological research. In Argentina, he published over 300 scientific texts in a very broad field. In May 1910 he was appointed professor of zoology at the Faculty of Agriculture and Veterinary Medicine of the University of Buenos Aires.

Among the areas Lahille worked in are studies on worms in apples and pears, parasitic diseases in agriculture and the fertility of ticks in different life periods, but also largely on invertebrates, such as echinoderms, molluscs, crustaceans, hexapods, arachnids and tunicates. He was also the author of works of a philosophical, technical, anthropological, linguistic and educational nature.

The Argentine stingray (Torpedo puelcha) Lahille, 1926, the spectacled porpoise (Phocoena dioptrica) Lahille, 1912 and the sea urchin Clavelina nana Lahille, 1890 are examples of species first described by Lahille. The tunicate Didemnum lahillei Hartmeyer, 1909, the knot species Simulium lahillei Paterson & Shannon, 1927 and the dragonhead fish Helicolenus lahillei Norman, 1937 are named in his honour.
