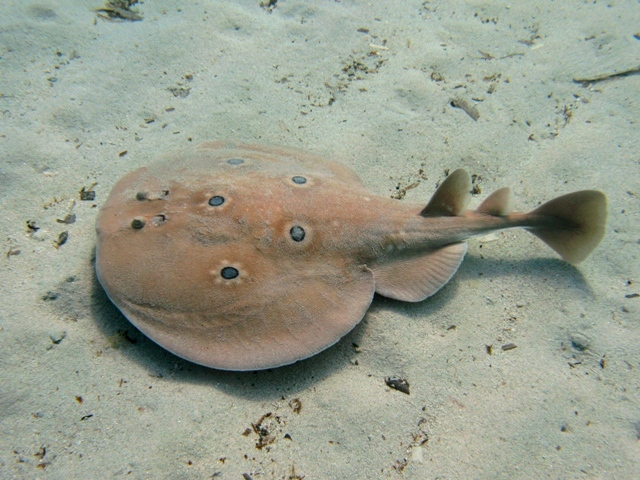
- Torpedo torpedo

Scientific classification
- Kingdom: Animalia
- Phylum: Chordata
- Class: Chondrichthyes
- Subclass: Elasmobranchii
- Order: Torpediniformes
- Family: Torpedinidae
- Genus: Torpedo; Forsskål, 1775

Type species
- Torpedo torpedo Linnaeus, 1758

= Torpedo (genus) =

Torpedo Temporal range: Late Paleocene–recent

Genus of cartilaginous fishes

Torpedo is a genus of rays, commonly known as electric rays, torpedo rays, or torpedoes. They are slow-moving bottom-dwellers capable of generating electricity as a defense and feeding mechanism.

The naval weapon known as the torpedo was named after this genus, whose own name is derived from the Latin word torpidus meaning 'numb' or 'paralysed', presumably the sensation one would feel after experiencing the ray's electric shock.

== Taxonomic history ==
Peter Forsskål validly published the genus name Torpedo in 1775, predating the use of the genus name Torpedo by Duméril in 1806, meaning that Torpedo Duméril, 1806 (often cited in catalogs) is a junior homonym of Forsskål's name and cannot be used. Forsskål included only a single species, Raja torpedo Linnaeus, 1758, thereby making it the type species of the genus. While Forsskål's description indicated that he had misinterpreted Linnaeus' name and ascribed it to another electric fish (currently known as Malapterurus electricus), this potential source of confusion was rectified in 2008, when Raja torpedo Linnaeus was officially made the type species under ICZN Article 70.3.1.

== Description ==
Torpedo rays are flat like other rays, disc-shaped, with caudal fins that vary in length. Their mouths and gill slits are located on their undersides. Males have claspers near the base of the tail. Females are ovoviviparous, meaning they form eggs but do not lay them. The young "hatch" within her body and she bears them live.

== Electricity ==
The largest species is the Gulf torpedo, Torpedo sinuspersici, which can grow to a weight of 13 kg (29 lb). Electric rays have patches of modified muscle cells called electroplaques that make up an electric organ. These generate an electric gradient, similar to the normal electric potential across most cell membranes, but amplified greatly by its concentration into a very small area. The electricity can be stored in the tissues, which act as a battery. The battery can be discharged in pulses. A ray can emit a shock into the body of a prey animal to stun it and make it easier to capture and eat, or into the body of a predator.

== Use in neurobiological research ==
The torpedo electric organ, being composed of modified muscle cells, has proven highly useful in the neurobiological study of the neuromuscular junction. For example, agrin was first isolated from Torpedo.

== Ancient remedy ==
Scribonius Largus, a first century physician, advised the use of a live torpedo ray as a headache remedy. He stated, "Headache even if it is chronic and unbearable is taken away and remedied forever by a live torpedo placed under the spot that is in pain."

== Species ==
There are currently 13 recognized species in this genus:

- Torpedo adenensis M. R. de Carvalho, Stehmann & Manilo, 2002 (Aden Gulf torpedo)
- Torpedo alexandrinsis Mazhar, 1987 (Alexandrine torpedo)
- Torpedo andersoni Bullis, 1962 (Florida torpedo)
- Torpedo bauchotae Cadenat, Capapé & Desoutter, 1978 (Rosette torpedo)
- Torpedo fuscomaculata W. K. H. Peters, 1855 (Black-spotted torpedo)
- Torpedo mackayana Metzelaar, 1919 (Ringed torpedo)
- Torpedo marmorata A. Risso, 1810 (Marbled electric ray)
- Torpedo microdiscus Parin & Kotlyar, 1985 (Smalldisk torpedo)
- Torpedo panthera Olfers, 1831 (Leopard torpedo)
- Torpedo semipelagica Parin & Kotlyar, 1985 (Semipelagic torpedo)
- Torpedo sinuspersici Olfers, 1831 (Variable torpedo or Gulf torpedo)
- Torpedo suessii Steindachner, 1898
- Torpedo torpedo (Linnaeus, 1758) (Common torpedo)

The following fossil species are known from isolated teeth:

- †Torpedo acarinata Adnet, 2006 - Early Eocene of southwestern France
- †Torpedo chattica Reinecke, 2015 - Late Oligocene of Germany
- †Torpedo dormaalensis Smith, 1999 - Late Paleocene of Belgium
- †Torpedo pessanti Adnet, 2006 - Early Eocene of southwestern France
