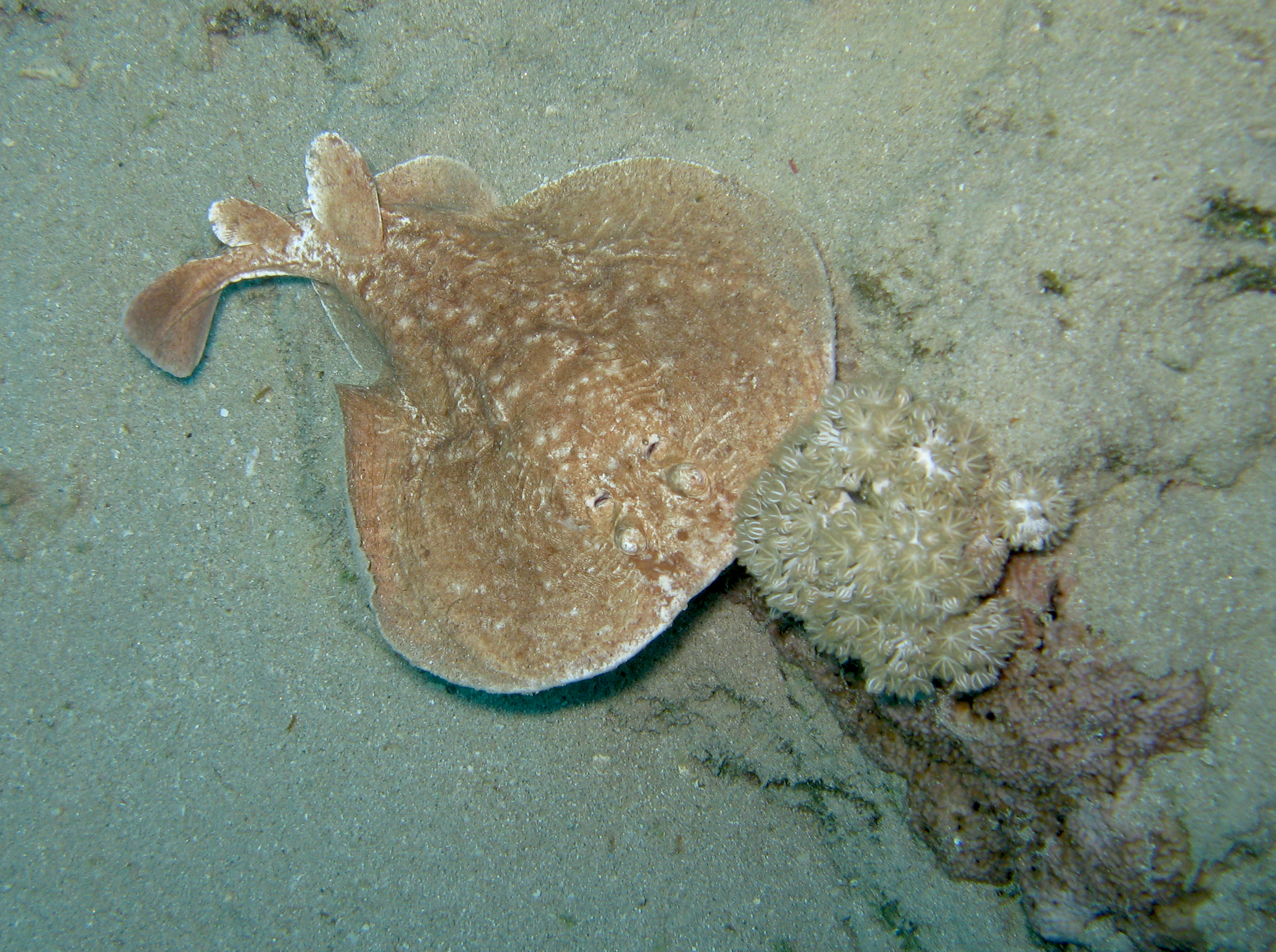

Conservation status
- Endangered (IUCN 3.1)

Scientific classification
- Kingdom: Animalia
- Phylum: Chordata
- Class: Chondrichthyes
- Subclass: Elasmobranchii
- Order: Torpediniformes
- Family: Torpedinidae
- Genus: Torpedo
- Species: T. panthera

Binomial name
- Torpedo panthera Olfers, 1831

= Leopard torpedo =

Species of fish

Torpedo panthera also known as the leopard torpedo or panther electric ray is a species of fish in the family Torpedinidae. It is found in Djibouti, Egypt, Eritrea, India, Iran, Oman, Pakistan, Saudi Arabia, Somalia, Sudan, and Yemen. It is reported in the northern Indian Ocean, including the Red Sea, the Gulf of Aden, the Sea of Oman, and the Persian Gulf. Its natural habitat is open seas.
