= Albinism =

Disorder causing lack of pigmentation

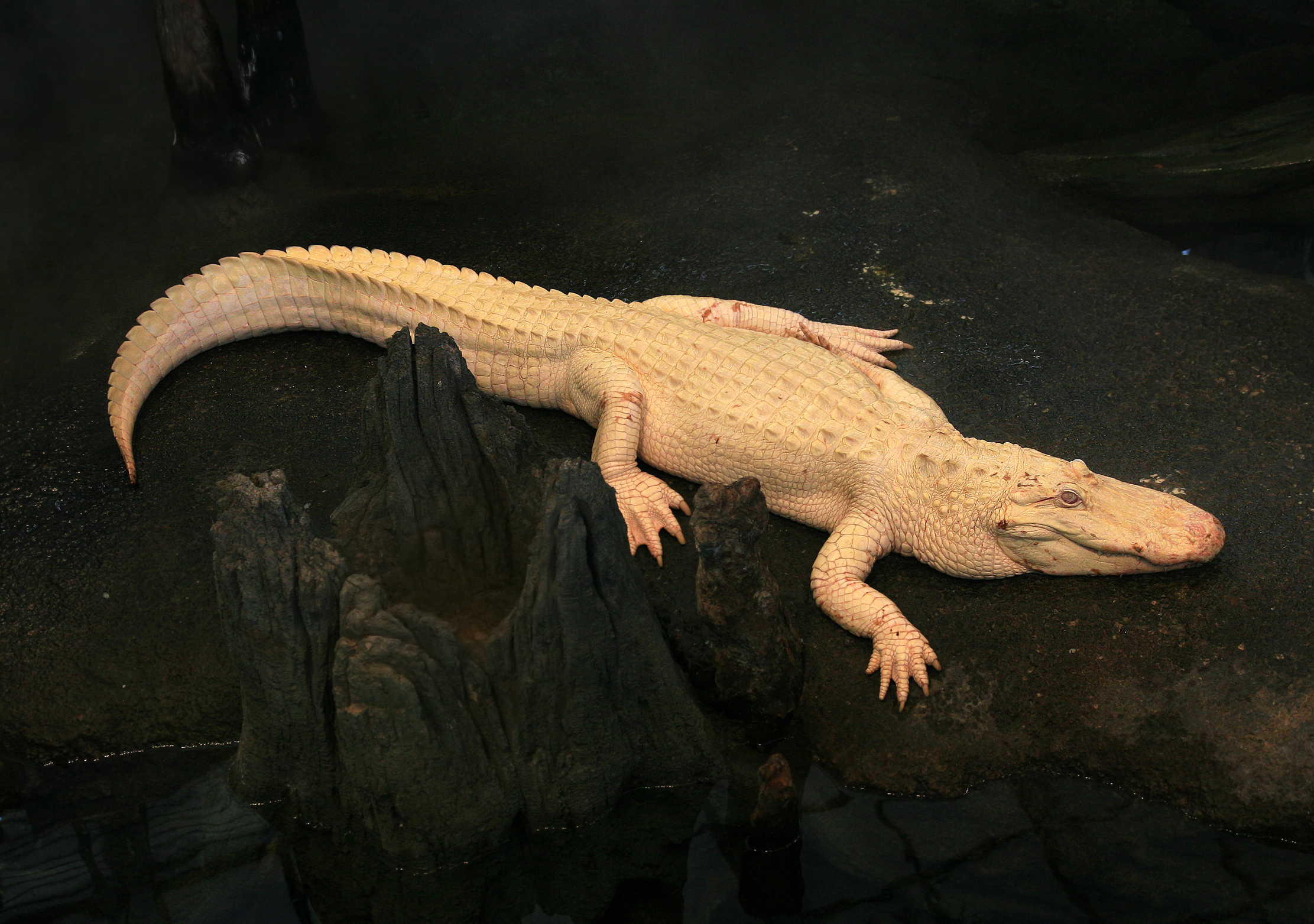
"Claude", an albino American alligator who lived at the California Academy of Sciences

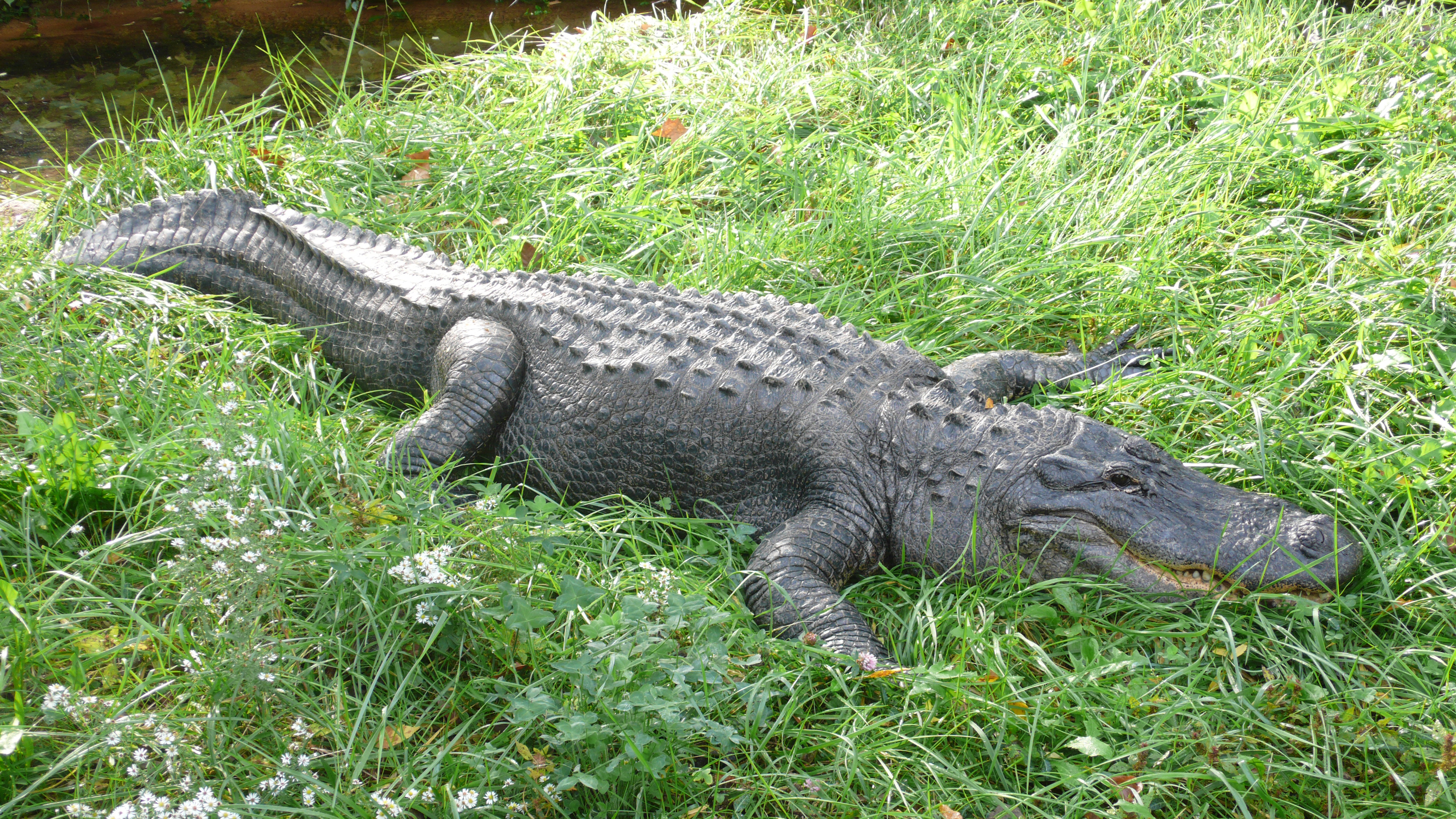
American alligator with normal pigmentation

Albinism is the congenital absence of pigmentation (in mammals, melanin) in an animal or plant resulting in "hair being white, red, or yellow", "feathers, scales, and skin being yellow", "eyes being red, pink, purple, violet, or blue", and "leaves or stems being white or yellow", if applicable. Individuals with the condition are referred to as people with albinism.

Varied use and interpretation of the terms mean that written reports of albinistic animals can be difficult to verify. Albinism can reduce the survivability of an animal; for example, it has been suggested that albino alligators have an average survival span of only 24 years due to the lack of protection from UV radiation and their lack of camouflage to avoid predators. It is a common misconception that all albino animals have characteristic pink or red or purple or violet eyes (resulting from the lack of pigment in the iris allowing the blood vessels of the retina to be visible); this is not the case for some forms of albinism. Familiar albino animals include in-bred strains of laboratory animals (rats, mice and rabbits), but populations of naturally occurring albino animals exist in the wild, e.g., Mexican cave tetra. Albinism is a well-recognized phenomenon in molluscs, both in the shell and in the soft parts. By definition albinism is a genetic condition, however a similar coloration could be caused by diet, living conditions, age, disease, or injury.

Oculocutaneous albinism (OCA) is a clearly defined set of seven types of genetic mutations which reduce or completely prevent the synthesis of eumelanin or pheomelanin, resulting in reduced pigmentation. Type I oculocutaneous albinism (OCA1a) is the form most commonly recognised as 'albino' as this results in a complete absence of melanin in the skin, hair/fur/feathers, and pink pupils, however this has led many to assume that all albinos are pure white with pink pupils, which is not the case.

In plants, albinism is characterised by partial or complete loss of chlorophyll pigments and incomplete differentiation of chloroplast membranes. Albinism in plants interferes with photosynthesis, which can reduce survivability. Some plant variations may have white flowers or other parts. However, these plants are not totally devoid of chlorophyll. Terms associated with this phenomenon are "hypochromia" and "albiflora".

The persistence of albinism in humans is generally the result of a mutation-selection balance in which the tendency to be reduced due to a small lack of fitness is counterbalanced by a low rate of mutation in the genes responsible for melanin production and regulation.

== Biological colouration ==
Biological pigments are substances produced by living organisms that have a colour resulting from selective colour absorption. What is perceived as a plant or animal's "colour" is the wavelengths of light that are not absorbed by the pigment, but instead are reflected. Biological pigments include plant pigments and flower pigments.

=== Animal colouration ===
Animals can appear coloured due to two mechanisms, pigments and structural colours. Animals may have both biological pigments and structural colours, for example, some butterflies with white wings.

==== Pigments ====
Many animal body-parts, such as skin, eyes, feathers, fur, hair, scales and cuticles, contain pigments in specialized cells called chromatophores. These cells are found in a wide range of animals including amphibians, fish, reptiles, crustaceans and cephalopods. Mammals and birds, in contrast, have a class of cells called melanocytes for colouration. The term chromatophore can also refer to coloured, membrane-associated vesicles found in some forms of photosynthetic bacteria. Chromatophores are largely responsible for generating skin and eye colour in poikilothermic animals and are generated in the neural crest during embryonic development. Mature chromatophores are grouped into subclasses based on their colour under white light:

- xanthophores (yellow): contain yellow pigments in the forms of carotenoids
- erythrophores (red): contain reddish pigments such as carotenoids and pteridine
- melanophores (black/brown): contain black and brown pigments such as the melanins
- cyanophores (blue): limited taxonomic range but found in some fish and amphibians

==== Structural colours ====
Animals can also appear coloured due to structural colour, the result of coherent scattering perceived as iridescence. The structures themselves are colourless. Light typically passes through multiple layers and is reflected more than once. The multiple reflections compound one another and intensify the colours. Structural colour differs according to the observer's position whereas pigments appear the same regardless of the angle-of-view. Animals that show iridescence include mother of pearl seashells, fish, and peacocks. These are just a few examples of animals with this quality, but it is most pronounced in the butterfly family.

- iridophores (reflective/iridescent): sometimes called "guanophores", reflect light using plates of crystalline chemochromes made from guanine
- leucophores (reflective white): found in some fish, utilize crystalline purines (often guanine) to produce a reflective, shiny, white colour.

=== Plant colouration ===
The primary function of pigments in plants is photosynthesis, which uses the green pigment chlorophyll along with several red and yellow pigments including porphyrins, carotenoids, anthocyanins and betalains.

== Definition ==
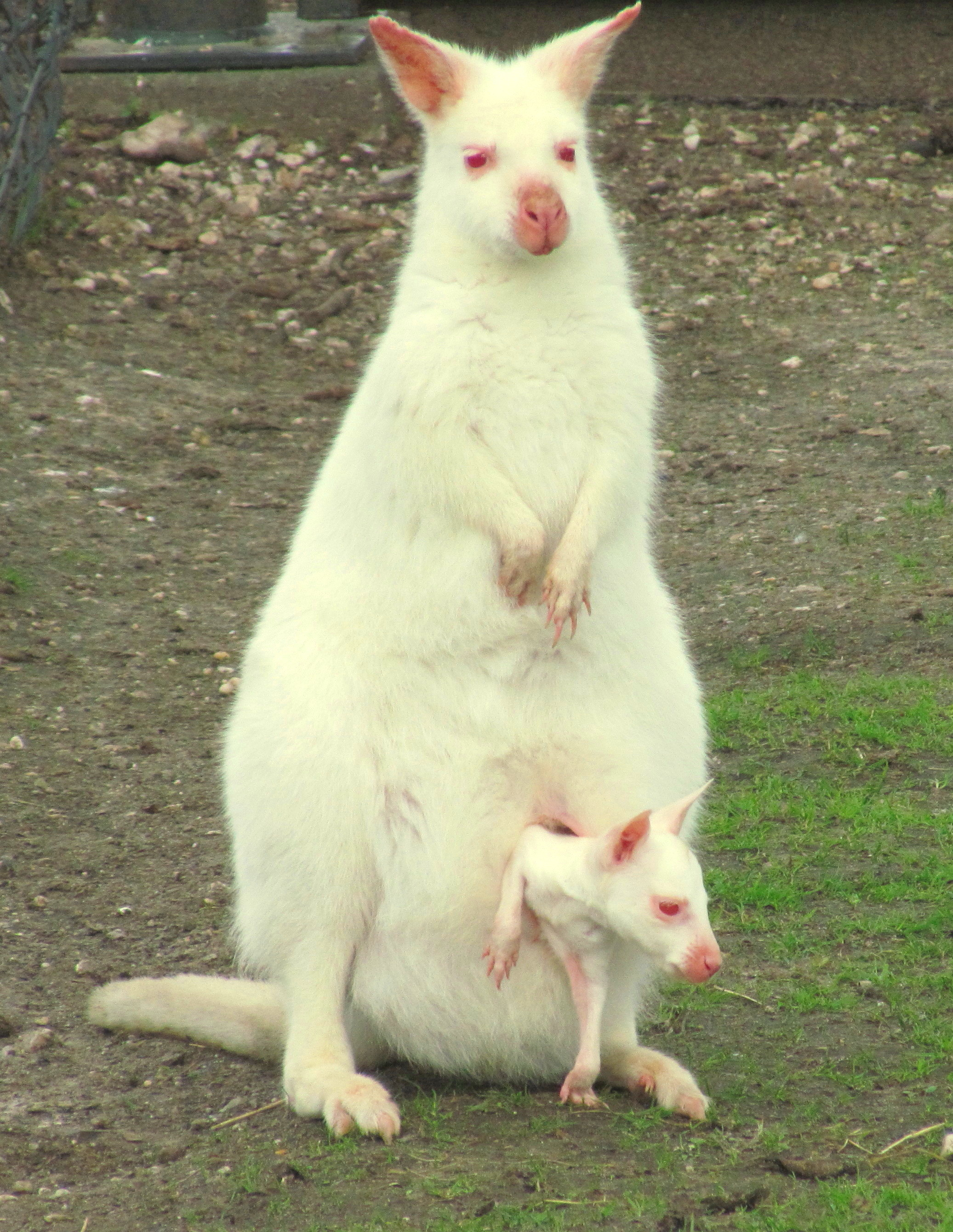
Albino wallaby (OCA1a) with her offspring

Definitions of albinism vary and are inconsistent. While they are clear and precise for humans and other mammals, this is because the majority of mammals have only one pigment, melanin. Many animals have pigments other than melanin, and some also have structural colours. Some definitions of albinism, whilst taking most taxa into account, ignore others. So, "a person or animal with very pale skin, white hair or fur, and pink eyes caused by a medical condition that they were born with" and "a person or animal with white skin and hair and pink, red and purple or violet eyes" do not include feathers, scales or cuticles of birds, fish and invertebrates, nor do they include plants. Some definitions are too broad to be of much use, e.g. "an animal or plant with a marked deficiency in pigmentation".

Other definitions of albinism encompass most of the major animal taxa, but ignore the several other pigments that non-mammalian animals have and also structural colouration. For example, "Absence of the pigment melanin in the eyes, skin, hair, scales, or feathers." refers only to the pigment melanin.

Because of the various uses of different terms applied to colouration, some authors have indicated that the colour of the eyes is the defining characteristic of albinism, e.g. "This leads to a good diagnostic feature with which to distinguish leucistic and albino individuals – the colour of the eye." However there are several forms of albinism – currently seven types recognised for humans – most of which do not result in red or pink pupils.

The term "partial albino" is sometimes used in the literature. However it has been stated that "A common misnomer is 'partial albino' – this is not possible since albinism affects the whole plumage of a bird, not just part" and the definition of albinism precludes the possibility of "partial albinism" in which a mostly white bird shows some form of melanin pigmentation. "It is simply impossible, just like being 'partially pregnant'". Conditions that are commonly termed "partial albino" include neural crest disorders such as piebaldism, Waardenburg syndrome, or other depigmentation conditions such as vitiligo. These conditions result from fundamentally different causes to the seven types of oculocutaneous albinism that have been identified in humans (and confirmed in some other animals) and the use of the term "partial albino" is therefore misleading.

One definition states that "albinism (from the Latin albus, meaning "white"), hereditary condition characterized by the absence of pigment in the eyes, skin, hair, scales, or feathers", However this does not encompass invertebrates, nor does it include plants. Furthermore, it could be interpreted that "...absence of pigment..." does not include an absence of structural colours.

The lack of clarity about the term is furthered when the name of an animal includes the term "albino" although the animals (clearly) do not have the condition. For example, the albino gaur has this name because it is ash-grey whereas other gaur are almost black.

A clear definition for albinism appears to be - "Congenital absence of pigmentation for coloration ranging in scope from partial to total." This definition incorporates all organisms and defines albinism as a physical condition. Because of its broadness and inclusion, it is a clear definition for albinism.

== Mechanism and frequency ==
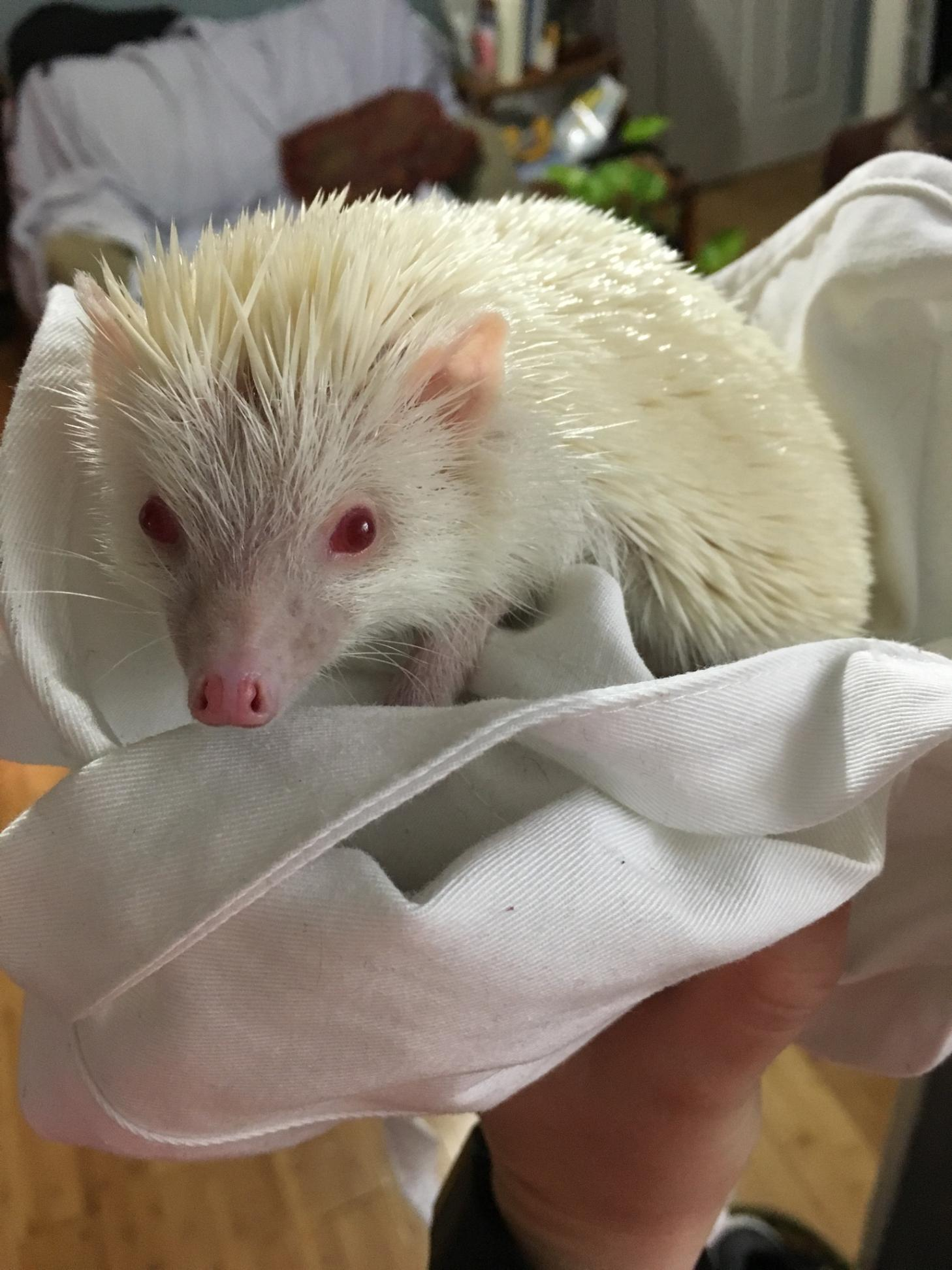
A hedgehog with albinism

Melanin is an organic pigment that produces most of the colour seen in mammals. Depending on how it is created, melanin comes in two colour ranges, eumelanin (producing dark browns and blacks) and pheomelanin (producing light reddish tans and blondes). The dark and light melanins have their influence either alone or in conjunction, making either plain or multi-coloured coats. Sometimes, in a condition called agouti, they make multi-coloured individual hairs. The production of melanin occurs in melanocytes in a complex process involving the enzyme tyrosinase. Mammals have a gene that codes for the presence of tyrosinase in cells – called the TYR gene. If this gene is altered or damaged, melanin cannot be reliably produced and the mammal becomes an albino. The TYR gene provides instructions for producing melanin through a process where Tyrosinase turns tyrosine into melanin by altering the chemical shape. Tyrosinase is an enzyme responsible for the production of melanin, tyrosine is an amino acid. A mutation stops the production of the tyrosine by altering TYR gene. Besides the TYR gene, several other genes can cause albinism. This is because other hormones and proteins are involved in melanin production, the presence of which is genetically determined. In mice, a total of 100 genes are known to affect albinism.

Most forms of albinism follow a recessive pattern of inheritance. However, this is not always the case. In palomino horses, genes coding for coat whiteness are dominant, and this is also true for several arctic mammals who possess dominant white colors which are pseudo-albinistic. However, these mammals differ from truly recessive albinos in that they still produce tyrosinase, and have normal eye pigmentation. In Japan, research has identified a dominant albinism in the rainbow trout.

Albinism occurs throughout the animal kingdom. The condition is most commonly seen in birds, reptiles and amphibians, but more rarely seen in mammals and other taxa. It is often difficult to explain occasional occurrences, especially when only one documented incidence has occurred, such as only one albino gorilla and one albino koala. In mammals, albinism occurs once in every 10,000 births, but in birds, the rate is once in every 1,764 births.

Some species, such as white peacocks, swans and geese, are not believed to be true albinos, as they do not have red eyes, rather, their colouration is suggested to be the expression of a white fur or feather gene, not a lack of melanin.

== Consequences ==
Melanin has several functions in most mammals and other animals; these are disrupted by albinism.

=== Abnormal eye development and appearance ===
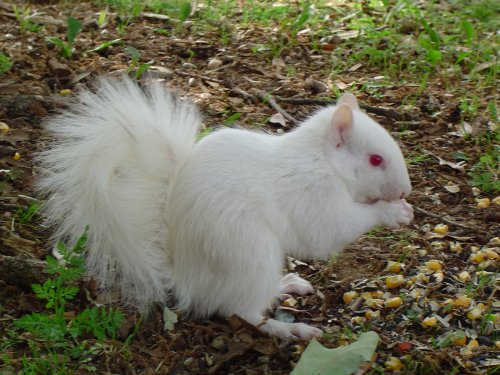
A true albino white squirrel. Note the reddish-pink eyes.

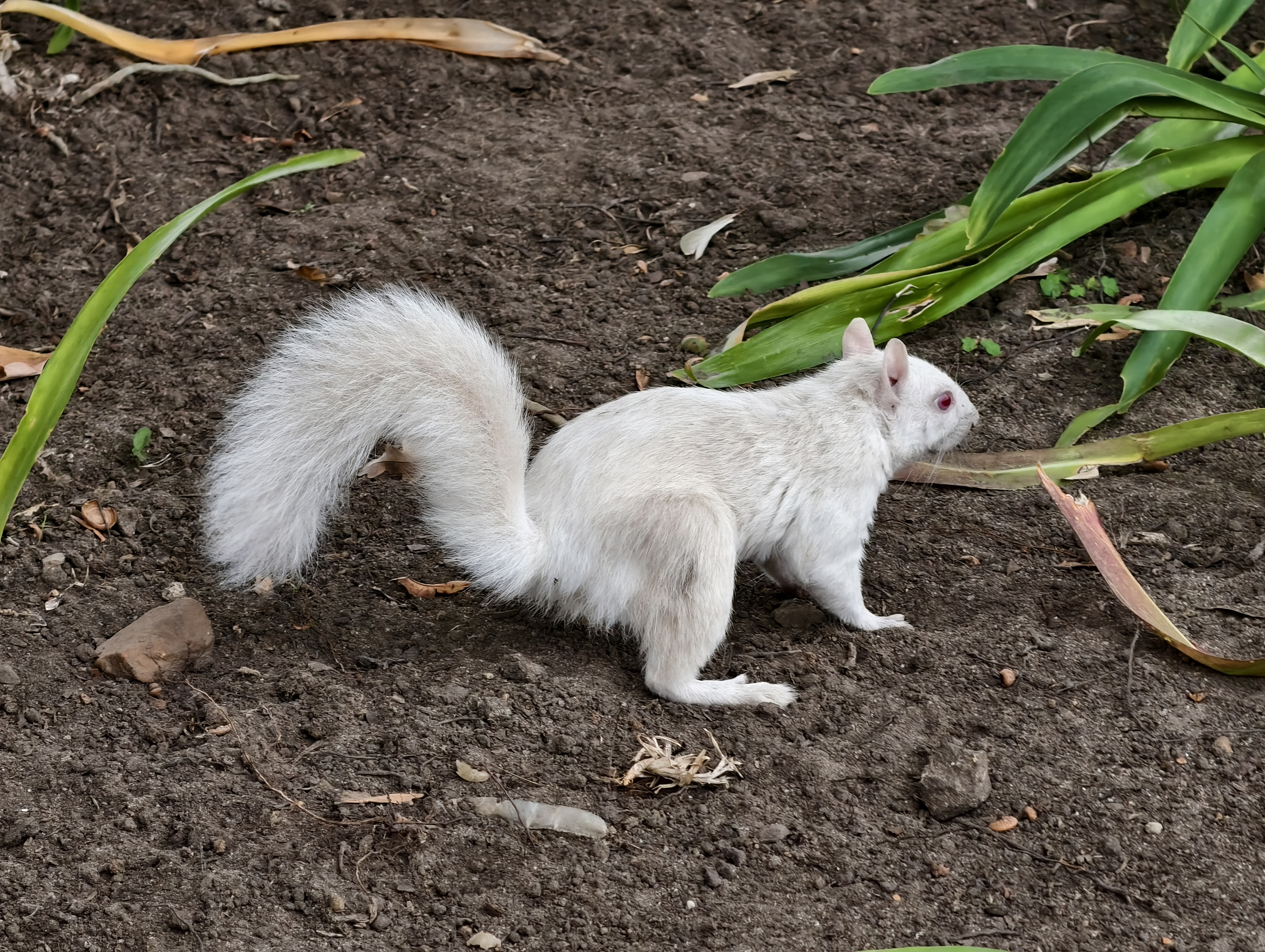
Eastern gray squirrel (Sciurus carolinensis) albino, Cape Town, South Africa

Melanin functions in the normal development of various parts of the eye, including the iris, retina, eye muscles, and optic nerve. The absence of melanin results in abnormal development of the eyes and can result in problems with light sensitivity (photophobia), refraction (astigmatism/myopia/hyperopia), and light entry (iris transillumination). The eyes of albino animals appear red because the colour of the red blood cells in the retina can be seen through the iris, which has no pigment to obscure this. Some albino animals may have pale-blue eyes due to other colour generating processes. Albino vertebrates exposed to intense light typically lose photoreceptors due to apoptosis.

In all albino mammals studied, the centre of the retina is under-developed and there is a deficit of rod cells, which detect light levels; the central ganglion cell density is approximately 25% below normal (except for the eastern gray squirrel). In nearly all mammals, the overwhelming majority of photoreceptors are rods rather than cones, which detect color. Albinism specifically affects the rod cells, but the number and distribution of the cones is unaffected. In contrast, the retinas of birds are cone rich, meaning that the vision of albino birds is affected less than albino mammals.

=== Reduced protection from sunlight in albino creatures ===
Melanin protects the skin from ultra-violet radiation in sunlight. Melanosomes block harmful electromagnetic radiation from the sun while allowing beneficial frequencies to enter the body. This means there is an increased risk of developing skin cancer from UV radiation in albino creatures due to a lack of protection.

=== Survival value ===
Animals with albinism may lack protective camouflage in some environments, and are therefore less able to conceal themselves from their predators or prey. However, in other environments albino animals are less likely to be killed, and selection may favor them. The lower survival rate of animals with albinism in certain environments has been documented, however, it has been stated that in studies where animals had many places to hide, predators captured albino and normally coloured animals at the same rate. Furthermore, in certain species, albino animals may be excluded from families or other groups, or rejected as mates.

On the other hand, there is also evidence for positive selection for albinism in some animals, as well as cultural selection favoring albino people in some human societies, which results in the increase of genes associated with albinism. The founder effect may explain why some animal populations become selected for albinism. They have also been protected in studies on their ecology, sociology and behaviour.

=== Reduced viability ===
Studies on medaka fish in the laboratory, i.e. with no predators, sufficient food supply, controlled temperatures, etc., found that albinos had considerably reduced viability; from 800 albino embryos, only 29 survived to full adulthood. Early studies on fish led some researchers to describe albinism as a "semi-lethal mutation".

=== Hearing disorders ===
Pigmentation disorders such as albinism are occasionally associated with hearing impairments in mice, rats, guinea pigs and cats.

== In mammals ==
=== Terrestrial mammals ===
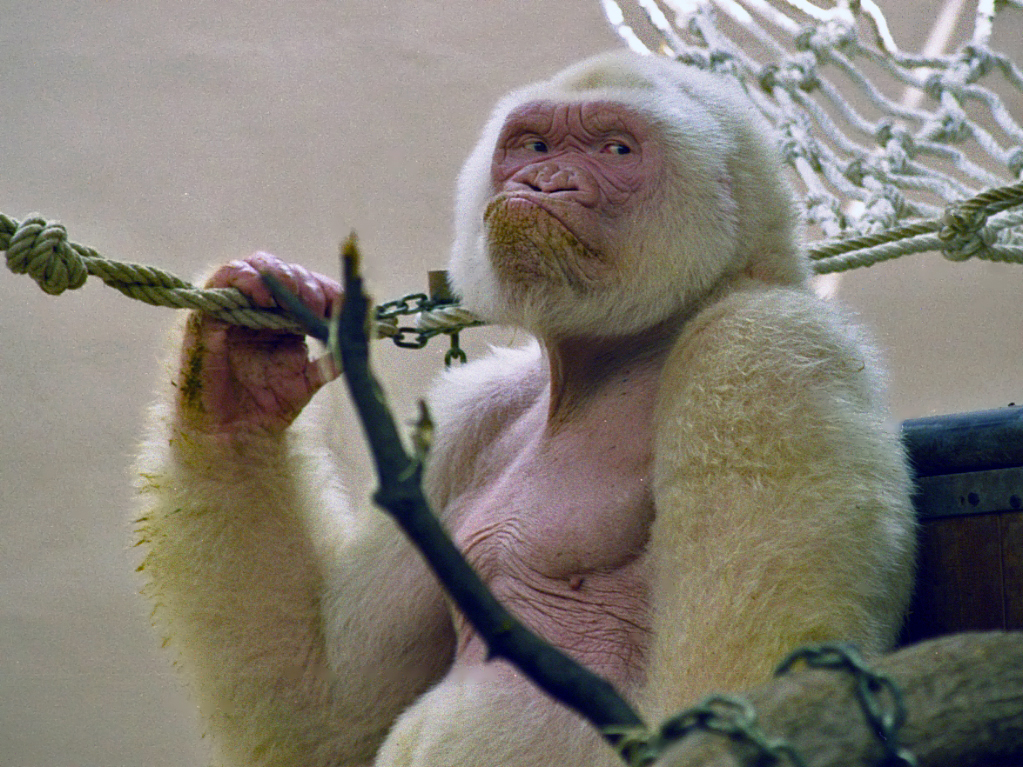
"Snowflake", a blue-eyed western lowland gorilla caught in the wild with Type IV oculocutaneous albinism

It has been claimed that "Squirrels are the only known albino mammals to survive successfully in the wild". The retina of the squirrel (Sciurus carolinensis) is unusual for mammals as it is rich in cones. Central cell densities are less than 5% lower in albino squirrels than in pigmented individuals. This relatively minor disruption to vision is thought to assist in the survivability of albino squirrels in the wild. This is supported by observations that the behaviour of albinos in the wild, e.g. leaping from branch to branch, is similar to pigmented squirrels. Albinism can also occur in marsupials and monotremes, such as echidnas, kangaroos, koalas, possums, wallabies and wombats. Albino macaques have been reported in several occasions including a toque macaque (M. sinica), rhesus macaque (M. mulatta), and bonnet macaque (M. radiata).

A 2012 survey of the literature reported that in India, there were several records of albino mammals including the tiger, lesser mouse-tailed bat, chital, common palm civet, northern palm squirrel, five-striped palm squirrel and wild boar.

Albinism was observed in jungle cats (Felis chaus) and jackals (Canis aureus) along the coastline of the southern Western Ghats (Kerala and Kanyakumari coast, India). Albinism was observed in jungle cats from the Amaravila area of Trivandrum district in the Kerala State. Albinism in jackals was observed from the Polooni area in Malappuram district and Chaliyam area of Calicut district (Kerala). As albinism is observed in those areas where the density of these mammals is comparatively low, it is concluded that continuous inbreeding could be the reason for expression of albinism.

A study on albinistic prairie voles (Microtus ochrogaster) found that albinism in this species conferred an advantage for the males compared to the wild-type; albino males had higher mount frequencies than wild-type males. In addition, the albinos had greater differential fertilizing capacity.

=== Marine mammals ===
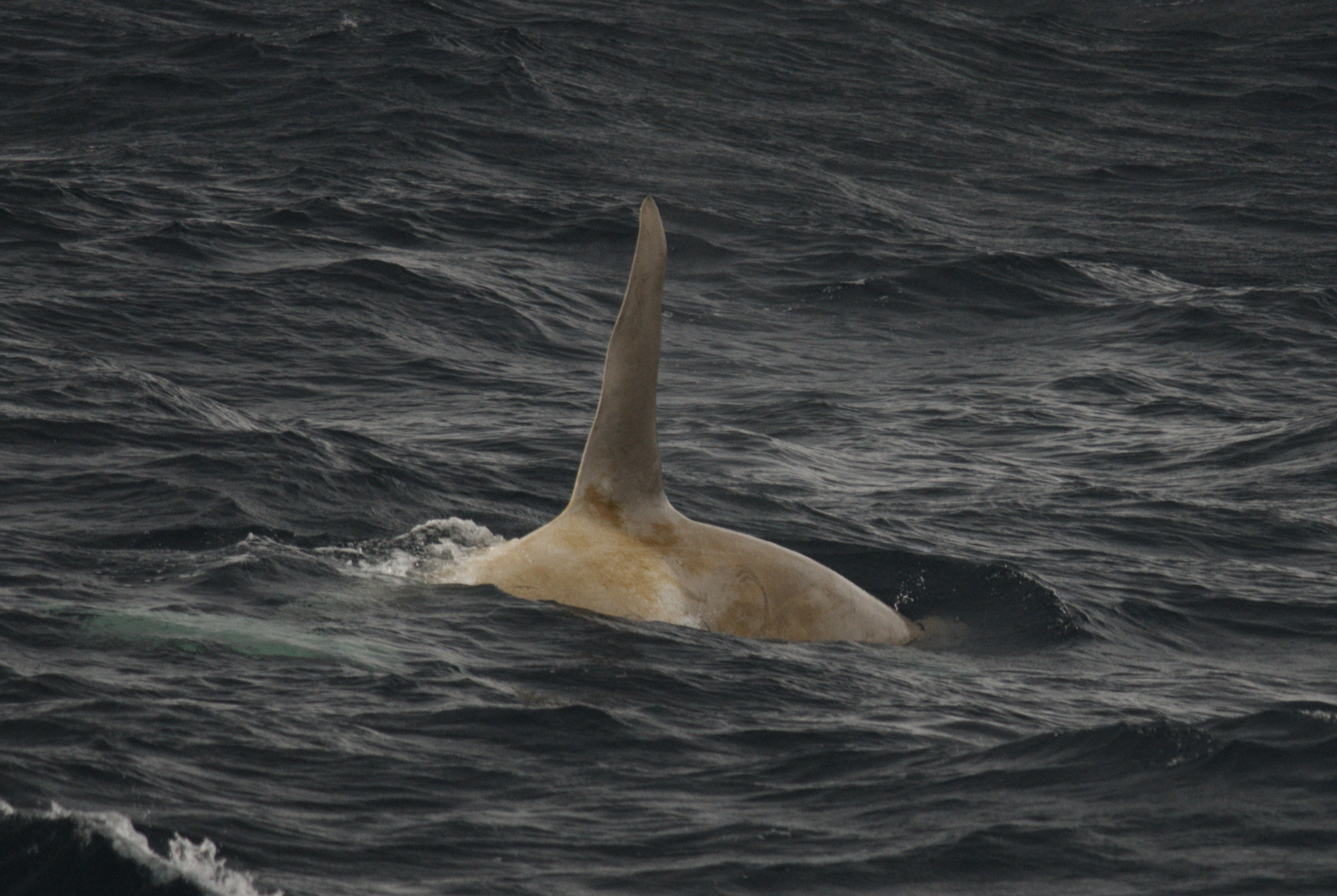
An albino killer whale

The costs of albinism for marine mammals may include reduced heat absorption in colder waters, poor camouflage from predators, increased sensitivity to sunlight, and impaired visual communication. Despite the costs, some individuals do reach adult age and breeding status.

Albino dolphins were first sighted in the Gulf of Mexico in 1962. Since 1994, three further individuals have been seen. These tend to be pink in colour due to blood vessels showing through the blubber and unpigmented skin. Whales and dolphins also may appear white if extensively scarred, or covered with a fungus, such as Lacazia loboi.

A report published in 2008 stated that in marine mammals, "anomalously white" individuals have been reported for 21 cetacean species and seven pinniped species but there were no known reports of anomalously white sea otters (Enhydra lutris) or sirenians.

=== Artificially selected ===
Examples of pet mammals artificially selected for albinism

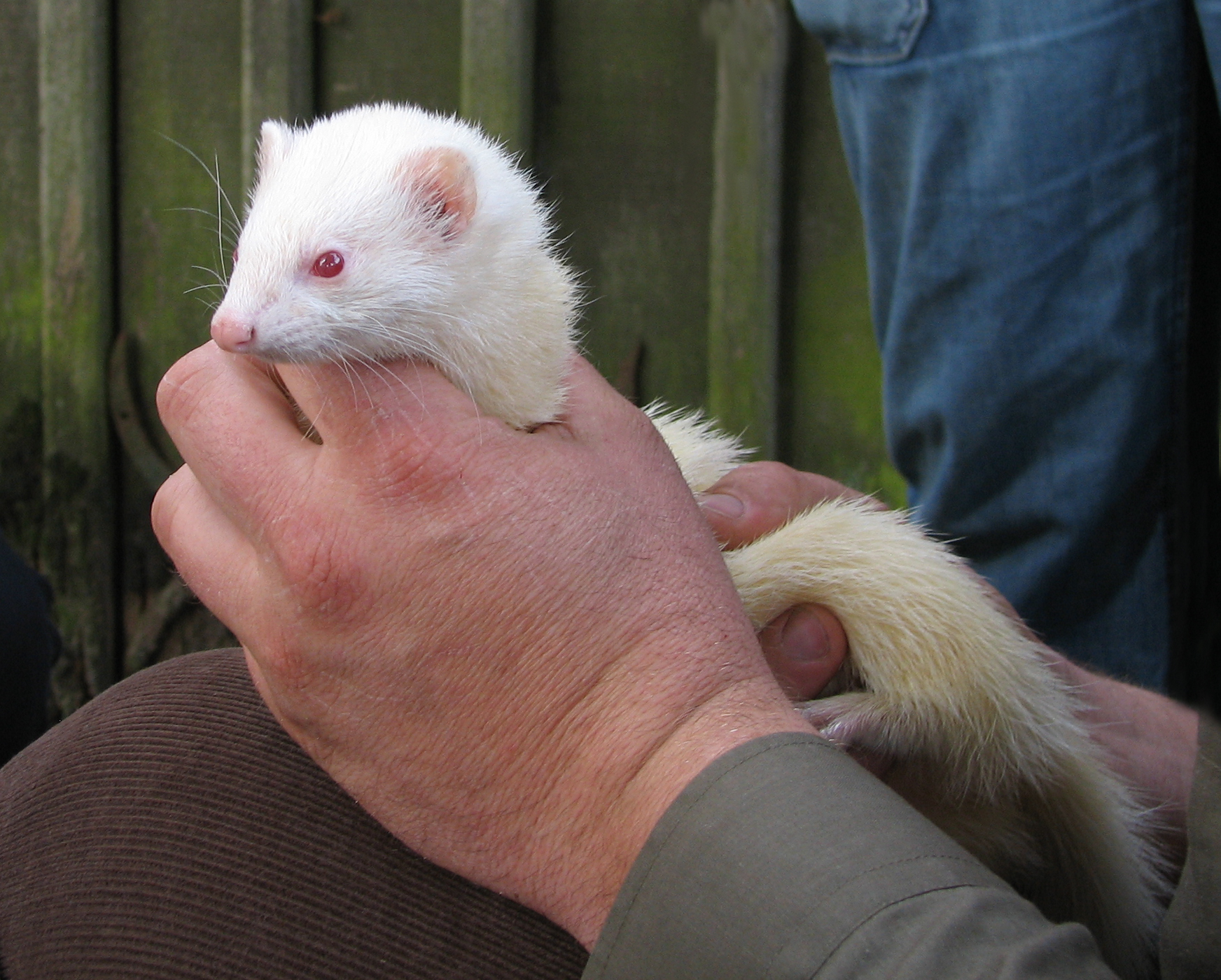
Albino ferret

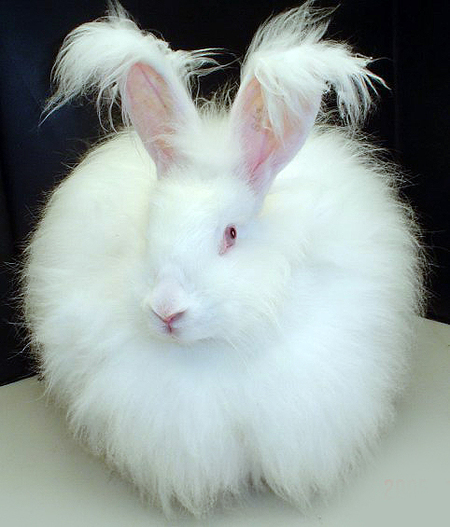
Albino rabbit

Intentionally bred albinistic strains of some animal species are commonly used as model organisms in biomedical research and also as pets. Examples include the BALB/c mouse and Wistar and Sprague Dawley rat strains, laboratory rabbits and ferrets. Some researchers have argued that albino animals are not always the best choice for scientific studies due to the consequences of albinism (e.g. hearing and visual impairments).

Many individual albino mammals are in captivity and were caught while young. However, the survival prospects of these creatures into adulthood outside of captivity are uncertain. It is doubtful whether these individuals would have survived to become adults without the protection and care they receive in captivity. Albino animals are also kept as pets, for example, African clawed frog, guinea pigs and peacocks.

=== Famous albino mammals ===
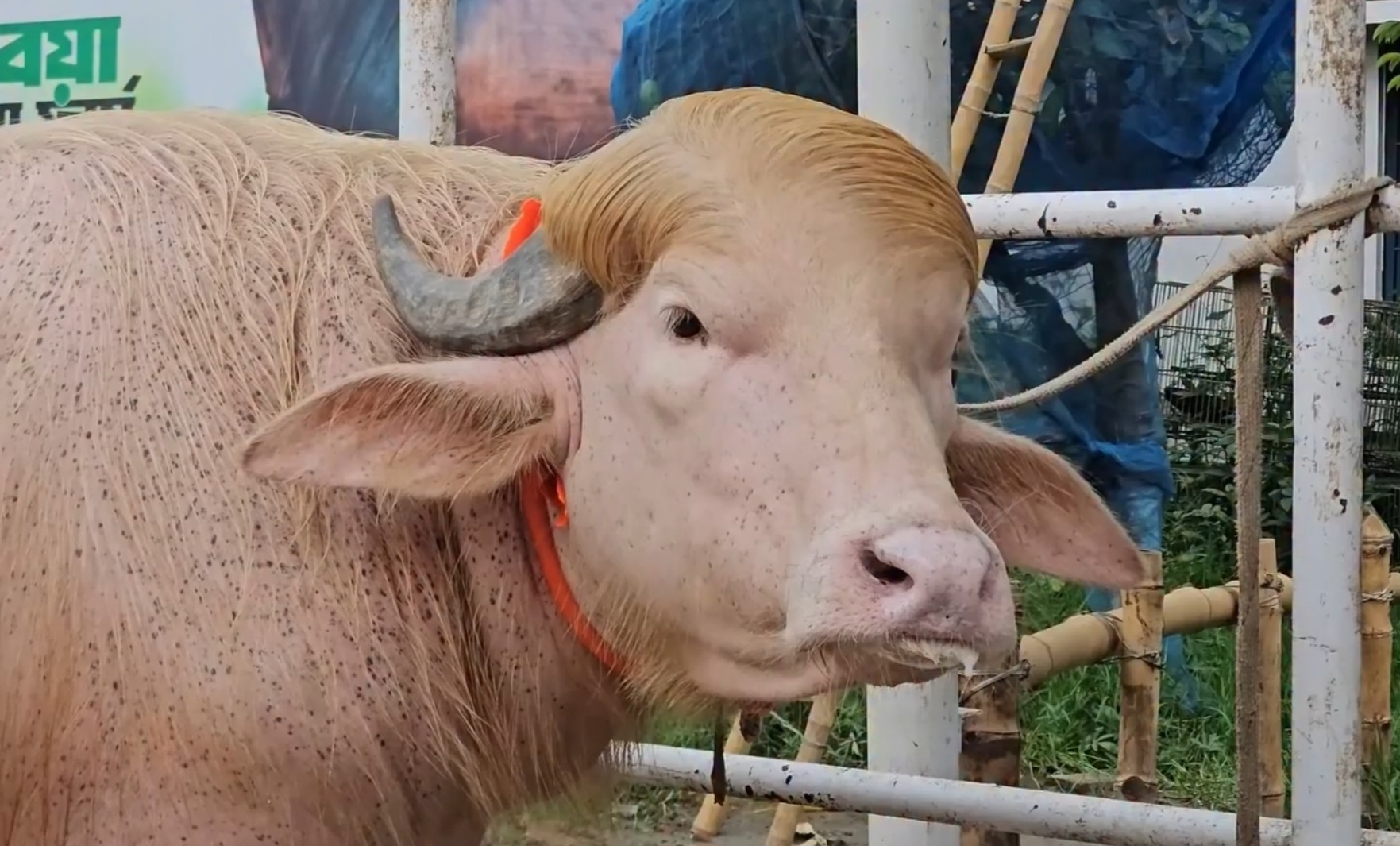
Donald Trump, an albino water buffalo from Bangladesh that became viral for its resemblance with the US President Donald Trump

Famous albino mammals include Migaloo, a humpback whale living off the coast of Australia; Pinky, a bottlenose dolphin living in and around in Calcasieu Lake, Louisiana; Carolina Snowball, a popular albino bottlenose dolphin displayed at the Miami Seaquarium in the early 1960s; Snowflake, a Barcelona Zoo gorilla; Mahpiya Ska, (Sioux for White Cloud), a buffalo in Jamestown, North Dakota; a sperm whale known as Mocha Dick, inspiration for Herman Melville's novel Moby-Dick; and Donald Trump, a water buffalo in Bangladesh.

== In birds ==
Kookaburras

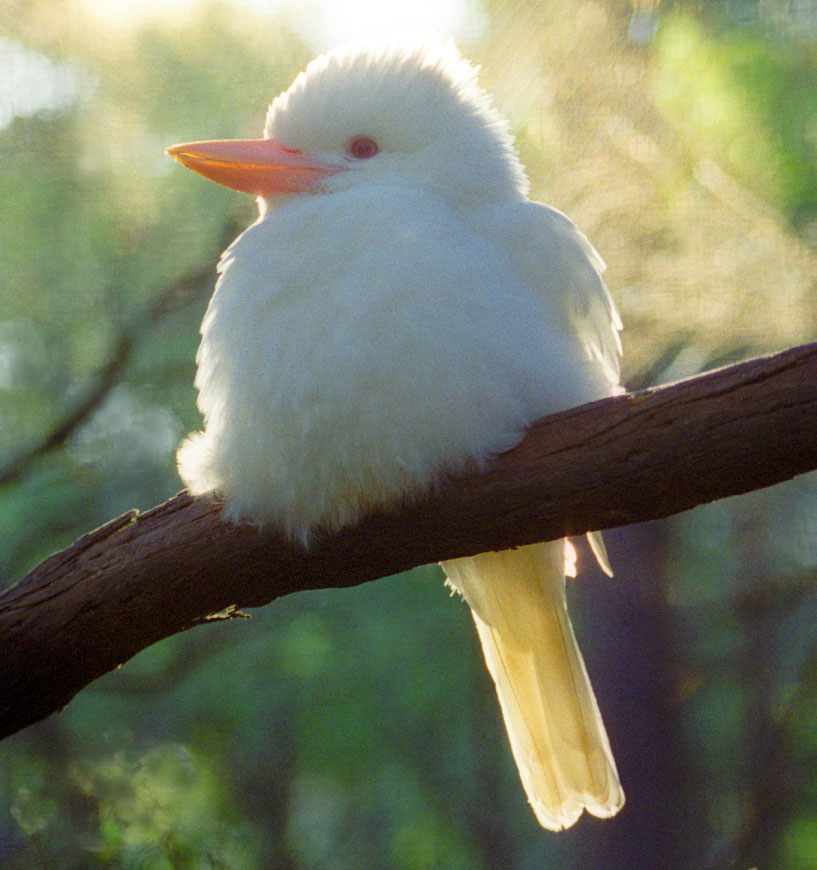
Albino kookaburra

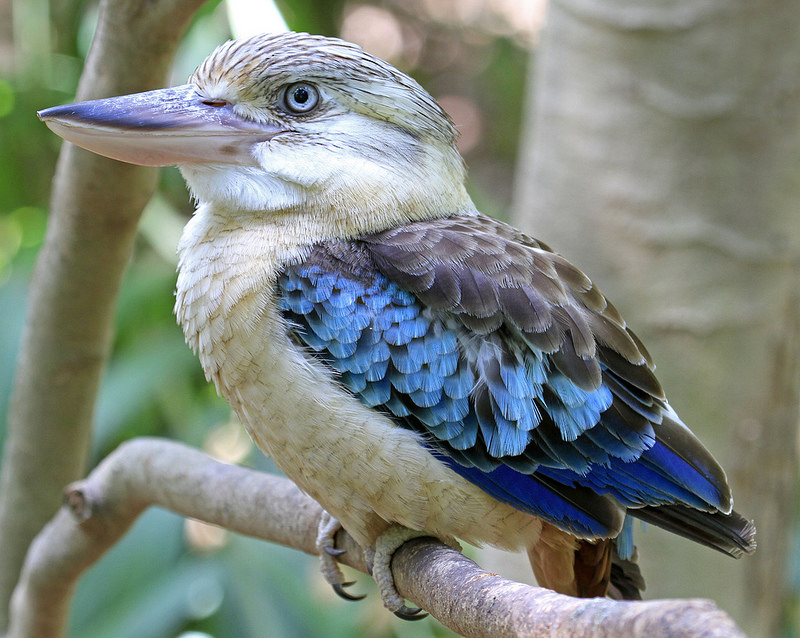
Blue winged kookaburra with normal pigmentation

The most important pigments that determine plumage colouration in birds are melanines and carotenoids. The latter are ingested in food and transformed into colour pigments by enzymes. Aberrations in this pigmentation are mostly caused by food deficiencies and usually do not have a genetic basis. Well-known examples are flamingos, which owe their distinct pink colour to the presence of red carotenoids in their natural food. When these carotenoids are in short supply, these birds appear white after the next moult. Mutations causing changes in carotenoid-based colour pigments are rare; melanine mutations occur much more frequently. Two types of melanin, eumelanin and phaeomelanin, are present in birds. In the skin and eyes, only eumelanin is present. In some bird species, the colour is completely caused by eumelanin, however, both types of melanin are found in most species. In birds, albinism has been defined as "a total lack of both melanins in feathers, eyes and skin as a result of an inherited absence of tyrosinase", however, this ignores the effects of other pigments and structural colours.

An albino bird has a white beak, white plumage, non-coloured skin, white talons and pink or red eyes. Albinism is only seen in about 1 of every 1,800 birds. A famous albino bird is "Snowdrop", a Bristol Zoo penguin.

In one study, albinism in birds has been categorised according to the extent of pigment absence.

1. Total albinism – a simultaneous complete absence of melanin from the eyes, skin, and feathers. This is the rarest form. Only 7% of 1,847 cases of avian albinism examined was this type.
2. Incomplete albinism – when melanin is not simultaneously absent from the eyes, skin and feathers.
3. Imperfect albinism – when melanin is reduced in the eyes, skin and feathers.
4. Partial albinism – when albinism is localized to certain areas of the body.

However, it has been argued that the definition of albinism precludes the possibility of "partial albinism" in which a mostly white bird shows some form of melanin pigmentation. "It is simply impossible, just like being 'partially pregnant'.

== In fish ==
As with other animals, it has been stated that for fish to be properly described as "albino", they must have a white body and pink or red eyes.

=== Naturally occurring ===
There are several reports of total albinism in both freshwater and marine fish, however, frequently captured albino fish are only reported in aquarium magazines and local newspapers.

The incidence of albinism can be artificially increased in fish by exposing the eggs to heavy metals (e.g. arsenic, cadmium, copper, mercury, selenium, zinc).

In the wild, albinism is reasonably common in the teleosts, especially the Pleuronectiformes (flatfish), however, it is rarely reported in the elasmobranchs. Albinism has been reported in hagfish, lampreys, sharks, rays and numerous teleost fishes, e.g. catfishes, grunts or cyprinids. There are several reports of albino lampreys and it has been estimated that this occurs at a frequency of one in 100,000 normal individuals. Albinism in the African lungfish has been reported on at least two occasions.

==== In Actinopterygii ====
Albino and normally pigmented channel catfish (Ictalurus punctatus), from class Actinopterygii, differ in their characteristics. Normal individuals of this species are superior to albinos in body weight and total length. Albinos crossed with other albinos require 11 days longer to spawn and produce smaller egg masses. These masses contain eggs of lighter weight with poorer hatchability than crosses of normal fish. The albino fish have lower survival rates than normal fish but dress-out percentages are nearly equal.

Some wild cave fish have populations that are albinistic. The Mexican cave tetra is a species that has evolved specialized characteristics in a series of independent caves. One of these is albinism linked to the Oca2 gene, a known pigmentation gene. This trait has evolved independently in at least two caves.

==== In Chondrichthyes ====
In the class Chondrichthyes, several species of naturally occurring albino rays and sharks have been recorded. Furthermore, an albino individual spotted ratfish (Hydrolagus colliei) from the order Chimaeriformes has been reported.

Albinistic individuals of the following shark species have been reported:

- Basking shark (Cetorhinus maximus) – two cases
- Broadnose sevengill shark (Notorynchus cepedianus)
- Great white shark (Carcharodon carcharias)
- Grey smooth-hound (Mustelus californicus) – two cases
- Japanese topeshark (Hemitriakis japanica)
- Japanese wobbegong (Orectolobus japonicus)
- Java shark (Carcharhinus amboinensis)
- Leopard shark (Triakis semifasciata)
- Narrownose smooth-hound (Mustelus schmitti)
- Porbeagle (Lamna nasus)
- Scalloped hammerhead shark (Sphyrna lewini)
- Spiny dogfish (Squalus acanthias)
- Tawny nurse shark (Nebrius ferigineus)
- Tiger shark (Galeocerdo cuvier) – embryo
- Whale shark (Rhincodon typus)
- Whitespotted bamboo shark (Chiloscyllium plagiosum)
- Zebra shark (Stegostoma fasciatum)

A study published in 2006 reported albinistic individuals of the following ray species:

- Bat ray (Myliobatis californica)
- Common skate (Raja batis)
- Common stingray (Dasyatis pastinaca)
- Common torpedo (Torpedo torpedo)
- Cownose ray (Rhinoptera bonasus)
- Giant electric ray (Narcine entemedor)
- Giant oceanic manta ray (Manta birostris)
- Ocellate spot skate (Okamejei kenojei)
- Southern stingray (Dasyatis americana)
- Thornback ray (Raja clavata)
- Cuckoo ray (Raja naevus)

=== Artificially selected ===
Examples of fish artificially selected for albinism

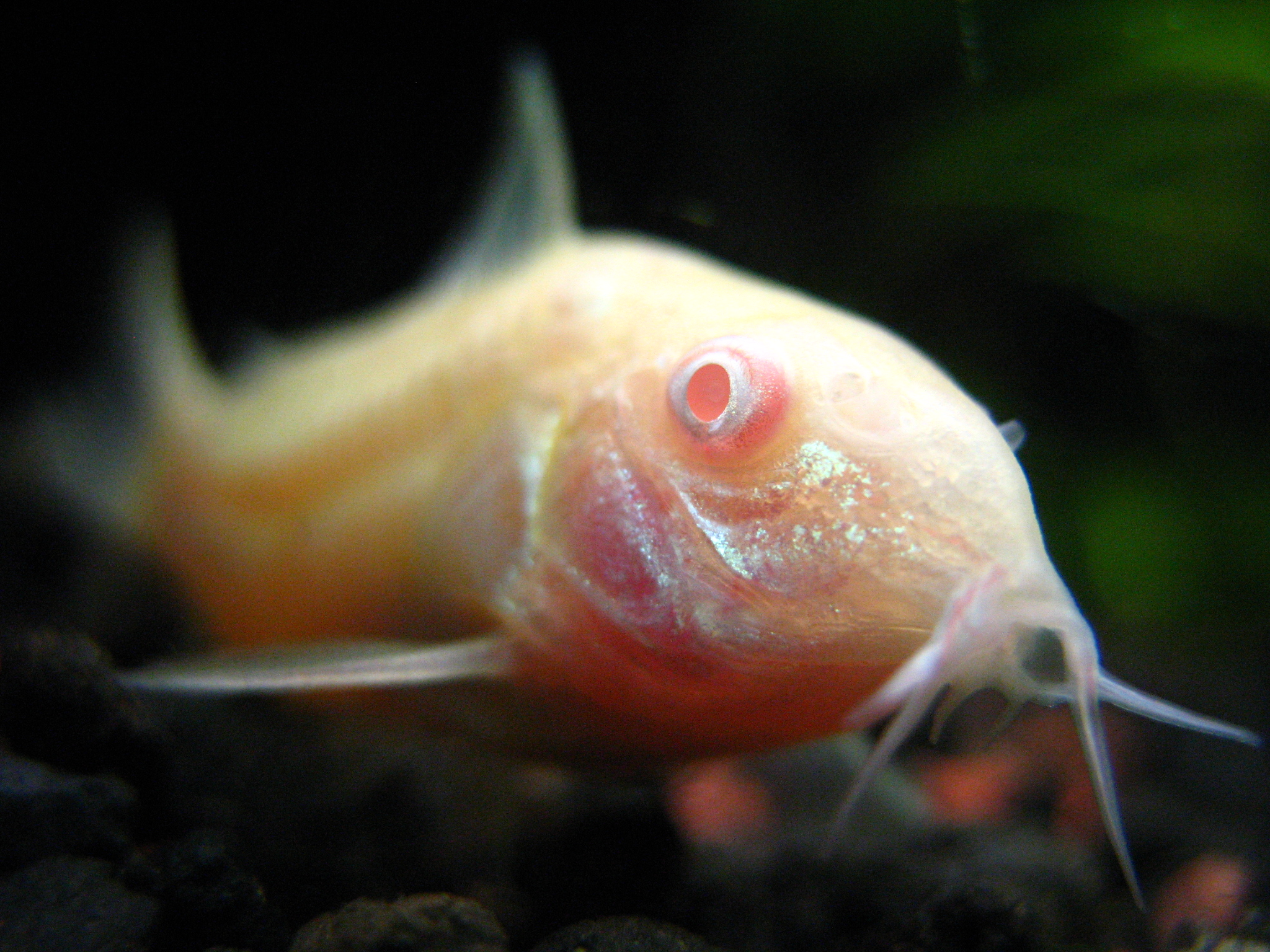
Albino catfish

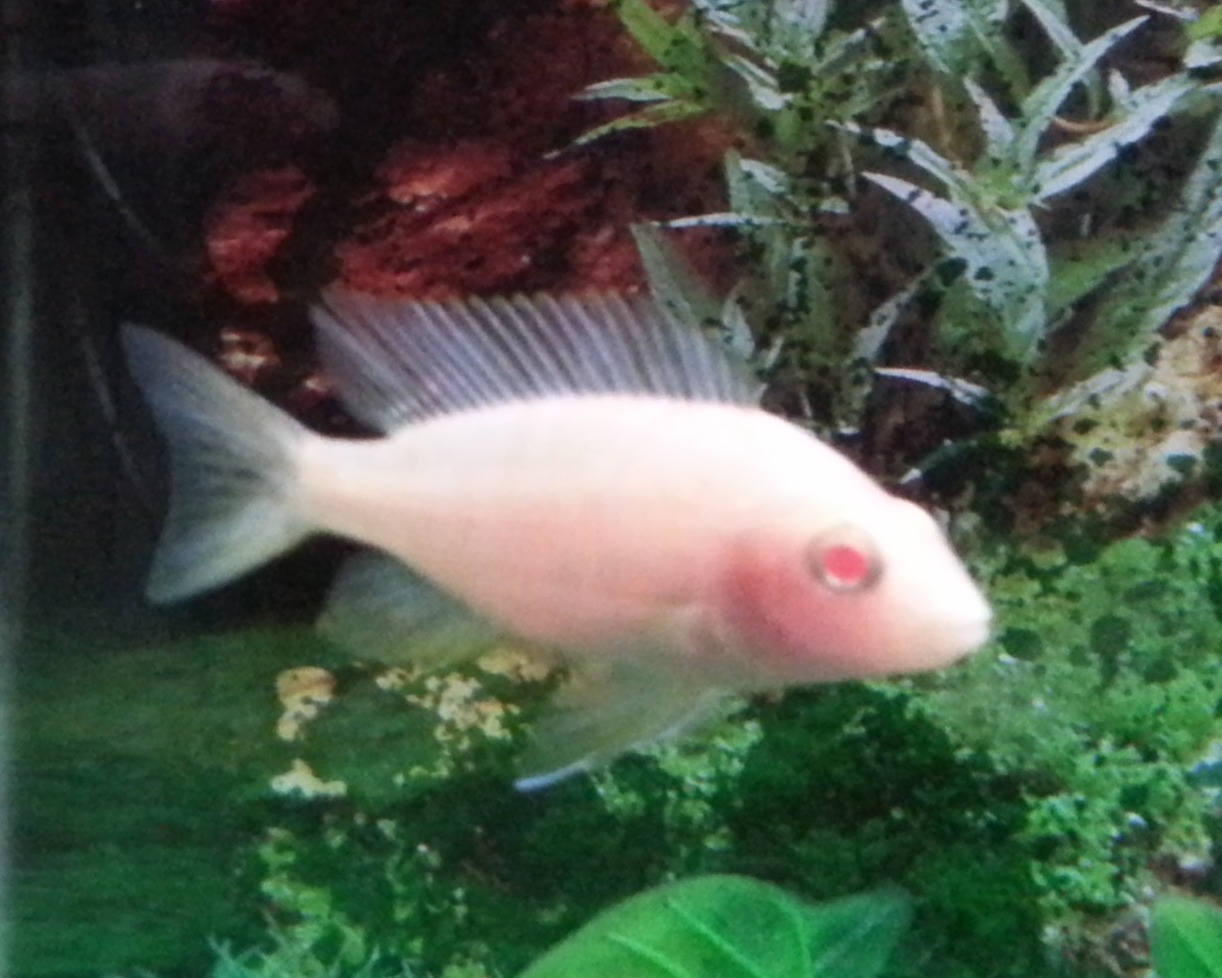
Albino peacock cichlid

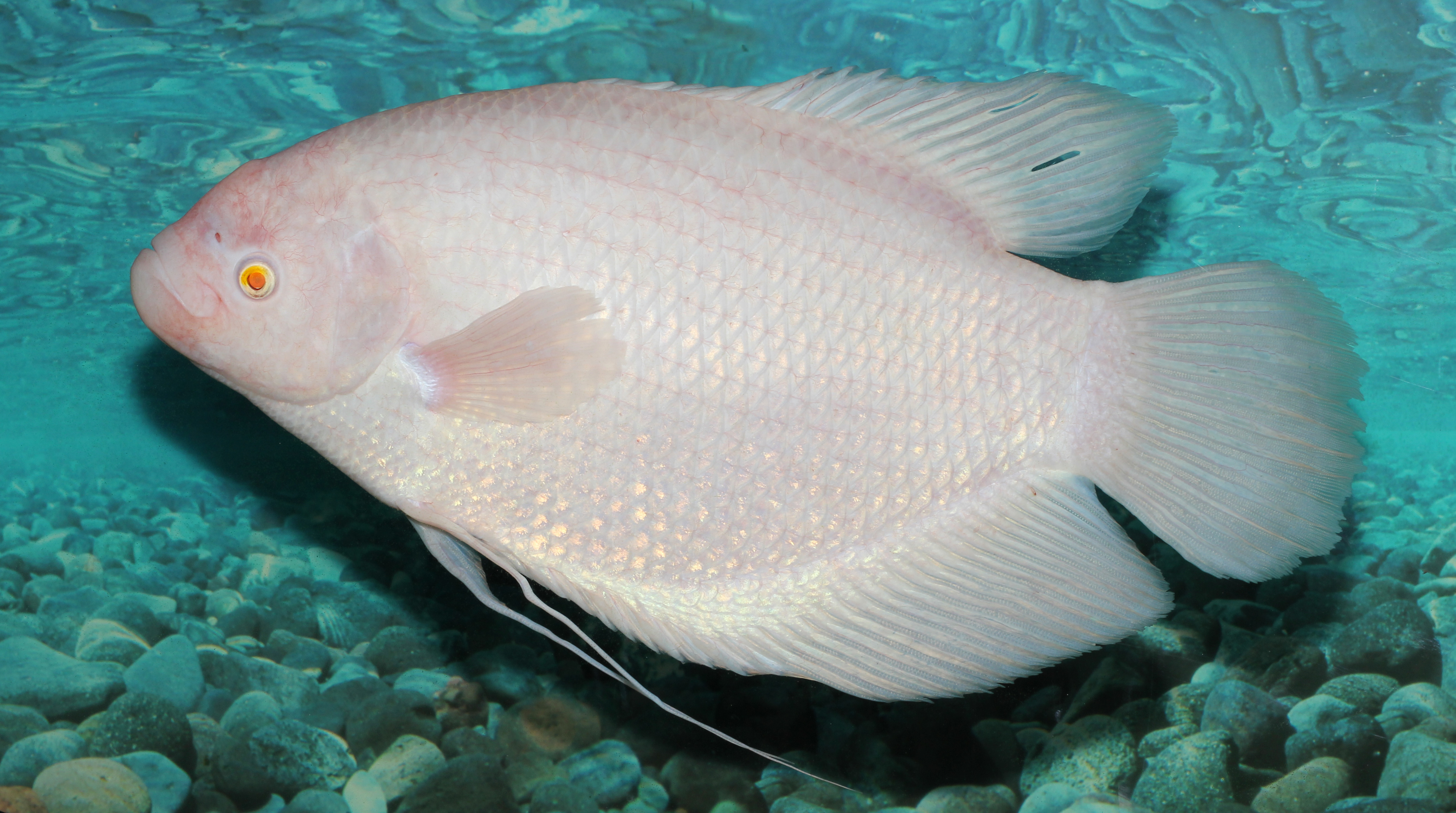
Albino giant gourami

Zebrafish have three types of chromatophores—iridophores, melanophores, and xanthophores—which produce silver, black, and yellow pigmentation respectively. Zebrafish that lack iridophores are known as roy mutants, those that lack melanophores as albino mutants, and those which lack both melanophores and iridophores are ruby mutants. The gross eye morphology, feeding and swimming behaviours between wild-type and albino zebrafish were indistinguishable, except under dim or bright light or low contrast.

In mammals, albinism is occasionally associated with hearing impairments. However, when tested, there was no differences in responses between wild-type and albinistic European wels catfish (Silurus glanis) and South American bronze catfish (Corydoras aeneus). Similarly, Mexican blind cave fish (Astyanax mexicanus) do not differ in hearing sensitivity from the normally pigmented and eyed surface-dwelling populations. Fish lack melanin in the inner ear, meaning that hearing in fishes is less likely to be affected by albinism than in mammals.

== In reptiles ==
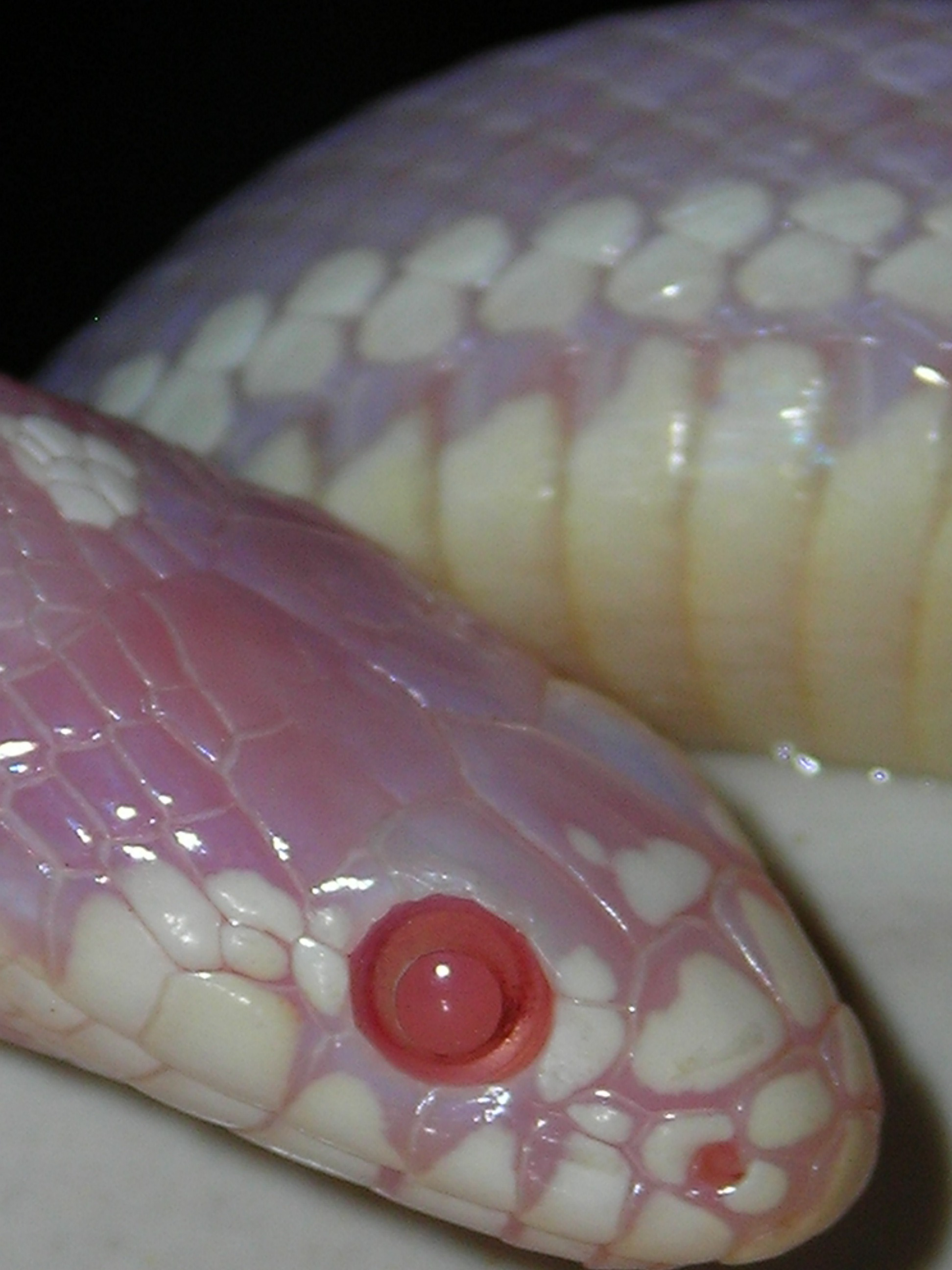
"Albino" California kingsnake

Many reptiles labeled as albino are, in fact, not completely lacking in all colour pigments. They are actually amelanistic, not albino. Reptiles often possess at least two pigments. Therefore, the absence of melanin doesn't make them albino. Instead, their appearance is determined by the non-melanin pigments. Among the most common are xanthin (yellow) and erythrin (red). An amelanistic reptile, therefore, may still have pale yellow, orange, or red pigmentation.

The California Academy of Sciences, in the Steinhart Aquarium, had on display an albino American alligator named "Claude". The alligator was partially blind because of lack of pigment in its eyes. The albino alligator hatched from the egg in 1995 in Florida, and was brought to the academy in 2008. This alligator would not have survived in the wild because its whiteness would have made it too easy a prey object. The only known albino alligators are in captivity. While extremely rare, white-coloured crocodiles and alligators do exist in other places. However, most of these animals are leucistic given that they have a general loss of pigmentation with some colour tinges remaining on their bodies although looking at first like other albino creatures, thus creating the misconception that the reptiles are albino themselves when they are not. Four such alligators are kept at the Gatorland theme park in the U.S. state of Florida. In Australia, a crocodile believed to be "part-albino" and nicknamed by people in the area as "Michael Jackson", attacked and killed a man.

In snakes, partial absence of pigment is more common than absolute albinism. For snakes that are usually patterned in colours, they appear as a faint blue, peach or yellowish. In these cases, there has been a genetic mutation in the melanin and pigment delivery. The appearance comes from the inability for full colours to be present, such as black, red, brown and others. The eyes of an albino snake are typically red or pink. Albino snakes can remain in the sunlight for several hours with minimal harm. Corn snakes and snakes of larger types, such as a boa or diamondback snakes, are the most commonly affected by albinism often appearing to be a pinkish or yellowish colour.

Albino tortoises and turtles are uncommon; Sulcata tortoises are the most likely type of turtle to express albinism. The shells have an almost yellow colouration and they have pink eyes. For turtles, a pure white colour is nearly impossible, even with albinism. Albino turtles can have a longer lifespan than many other albino animals; their hard shells help to prevent predation and other environmental challenges. Vision and sensory organs are slightly affected.

In 2012, an albino anole was reported and photographed. In 2007, it was reported that an albino stumpy-tail lizard (possibly a shingleback lizard), approximately 12 cm (4.7 in) long and roughly 1 year old, had been found in Victoria, Australia.

There are three known "albino" strains of leopard gecko, however, breeders state that albinos are generally recognized by their lack of black pigment and having red eyes is not a requirement to be considered an albino. These three strains are called "tremper albinos", "rainwater albinos" and "bell albinos".

== In amphibians ==
As with reptiles, many amphibians labeled as albino are, in fact, not completely lacking in all colour pigments. They are actually amelanistic, not albino. Amphibians have six types of chromatophore in their skin, i.e. melanophores, xanthophores, erythrophores, leucophores, cyanophores and iridophores. An amelanistic amphibian therefore, may still have various pigmentation.

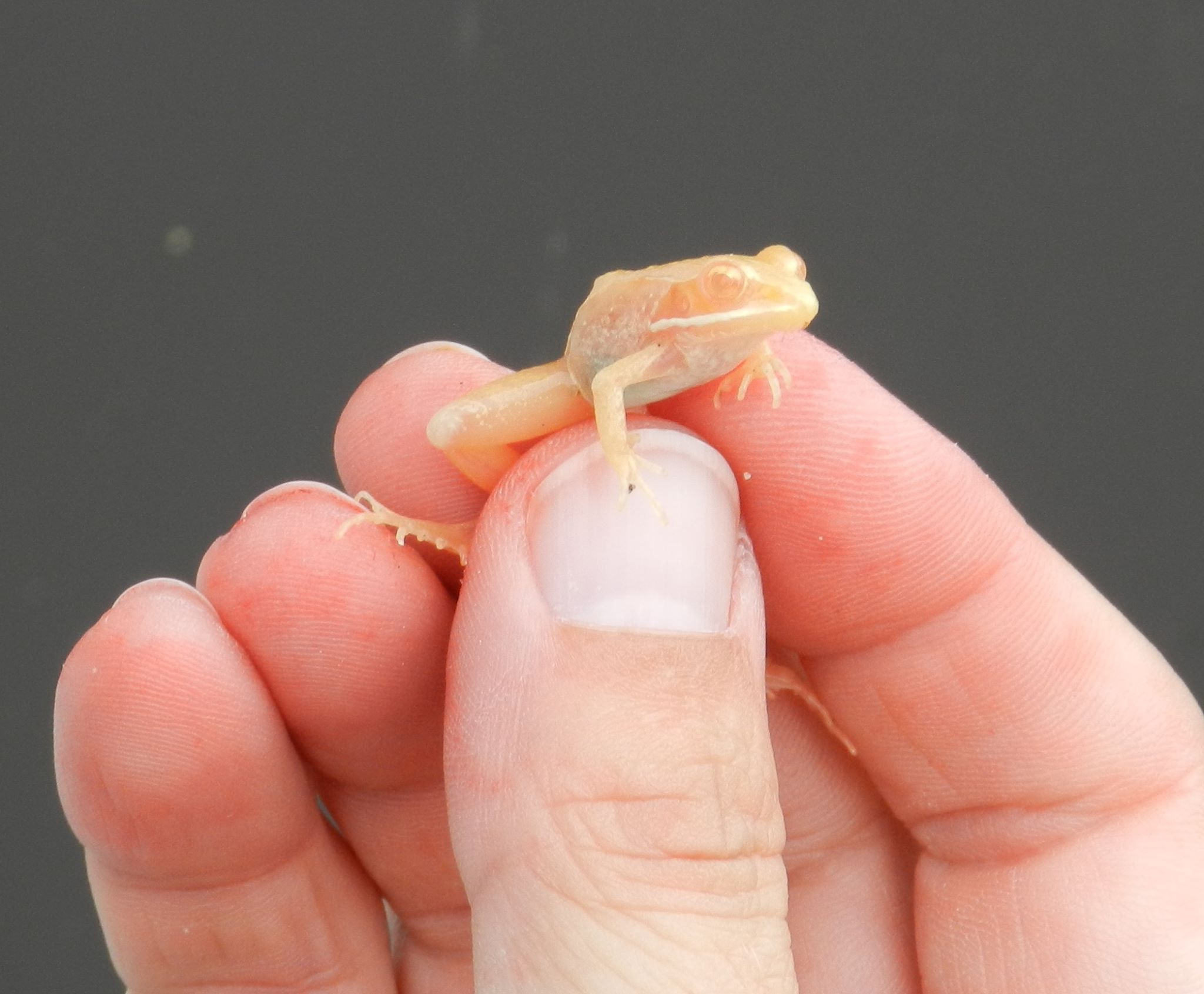
Wood Frog with albino phenotype

The incidence of albinism in frogs, salamanders, and newts is relatively higher than other taxa. It has been estimated that one in four hundred of these animals is albino. When albino tadpoles hatch, they are almost transparent. This may help camouflage them initially, however, after two weeks, when their hindlegs begin to emerge, they become milky white. A survey in 2001 found hundreds of tiny albino plains leopard frogs, but when the researcher returned a few months later, not a single albino adult could be found.

In European Salamandridae, albinism has been recorded in the fire salamander (Salamandra salamandra), gold-striped salamander (Chioglossa lusitanica), Italian crested newt (Triturus carnifex), marbled newt (Triturus marmoratus), Iberian ribbed newt (Pleurodeles waltl), alpine newt (Ichthyosaura alpestris) and two sub-species of the smooth newt (Lissotriton vulgaris vulgaris and Lissotriton vulgaris meridionalis).

=== Genetics ===
Genetic studies of albinism in amphibians have focused on mutations in the tyrosinase gene. The albino phenotype of the northern leopard frog (Lithobates pipiens) has been attributed to a failure in post-translational control in a single recessive tyrosinase gene which still has some tyrosinase and DOPA oxidase activity. This is in contrast with mammals, some of which have mutations that show no tyrosinase or DOPA oxidase activity in albinos. The albino phenotype of the pond frog (Pelophylax nigromaculatus) has been attributed to one of three mutations that created a dysfunctional tyrosinase. Two of those mutations involve an insertion of a thymine (T), a frameshift mutation, resulting in a truncated isoform of the TYR protein that is defective. The other mutation involves the deletion of a codon, three nucleotides that code for a lysine (Lys). In the wrinkled frog (Glandirana rugosa) and in the rice frog (Fejervarya kawamurai), a substitution from a guanine (G) to an adenine (A) creates a missense mutation, in which a glycine (Gly) changes to an aspartic acid (Asp) and an arginine (Arg), respectively. These changes in the polypeptide chain causes a dysfunctional tyrosinase.

Albino axolotl (an amphibian) are also used widely in the laboratory as their transparent skin allows observation of the underlying tissues during limb regeneration.

== In invertebrates ==
Albinism in molluscs has been recognized to be a hereditary phenomenon at least since 1900. Albinism in molluscs can exist to a variable degree. Sometimes an individual snail has a normally pigmented body, but the shell is completely without the normal pigmentation because of a defect in the cells of the mantle. Shells of certain mollusc species can be translucent when they lack the normal pigmentation.

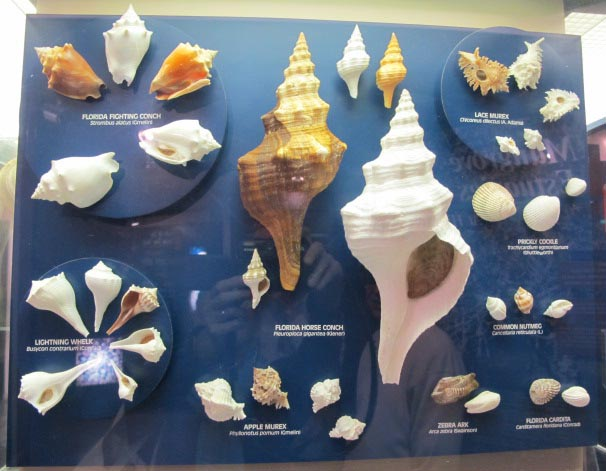
An exhibit showing albino and normal specimens of nine local species of marine molluscs, both gastropods and bivalves (The Bailey-Matthews National Shell Museum in Sanibel, Florida).

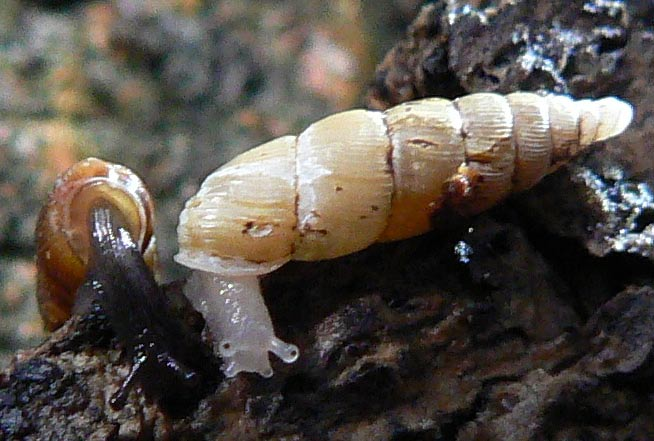
Normal (left) and albinistic (right) forms of the land snail Pseudofusulus varians. Note that in the albino both the body and the shell are lacking the normal pigmentation.

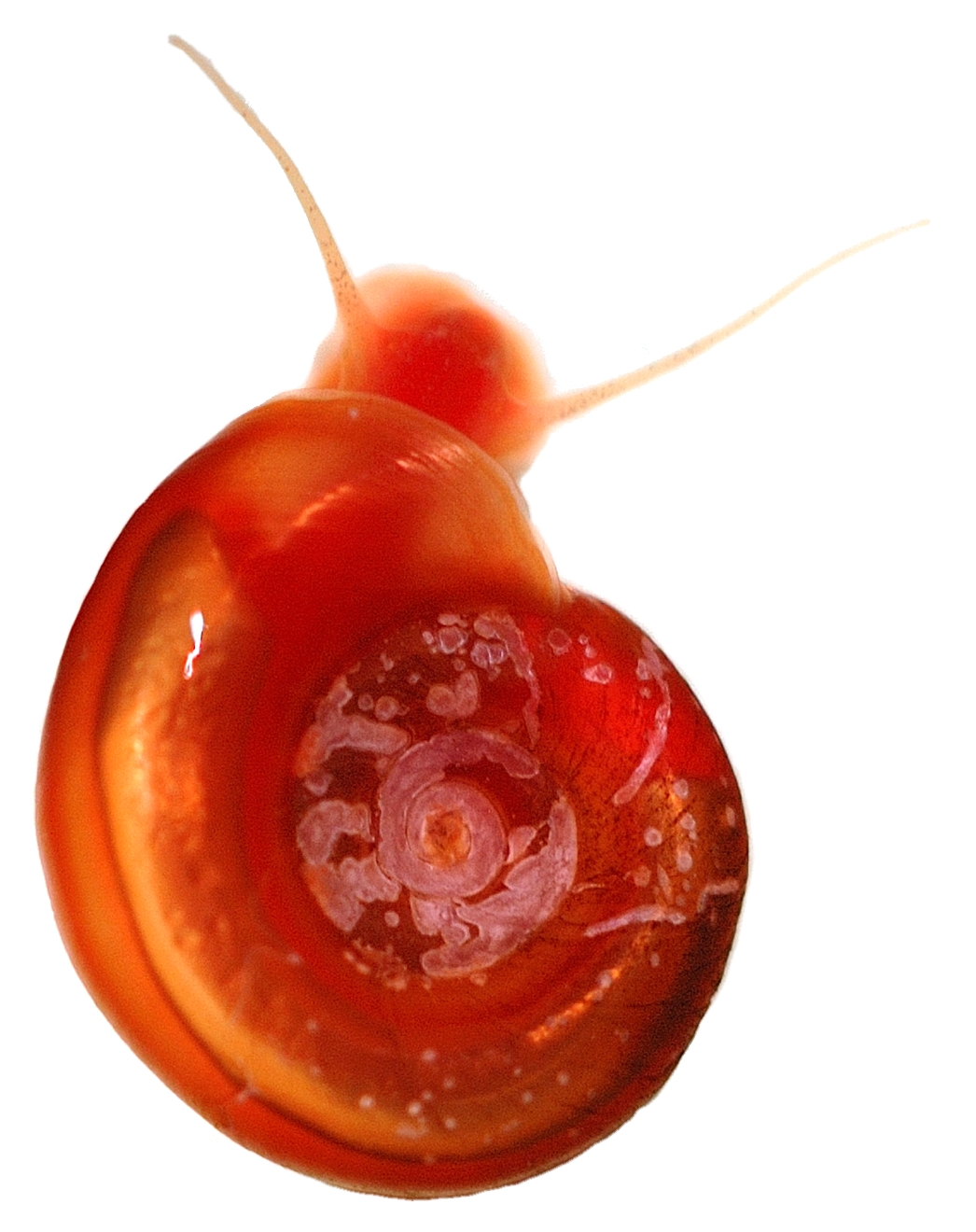
Albino freshwater snail Biomphalaria glabrata showing the red oxygen-transport pigment haemoglobin. Without its normal pigment, the shell of this species is translucent.

=== In insects ===
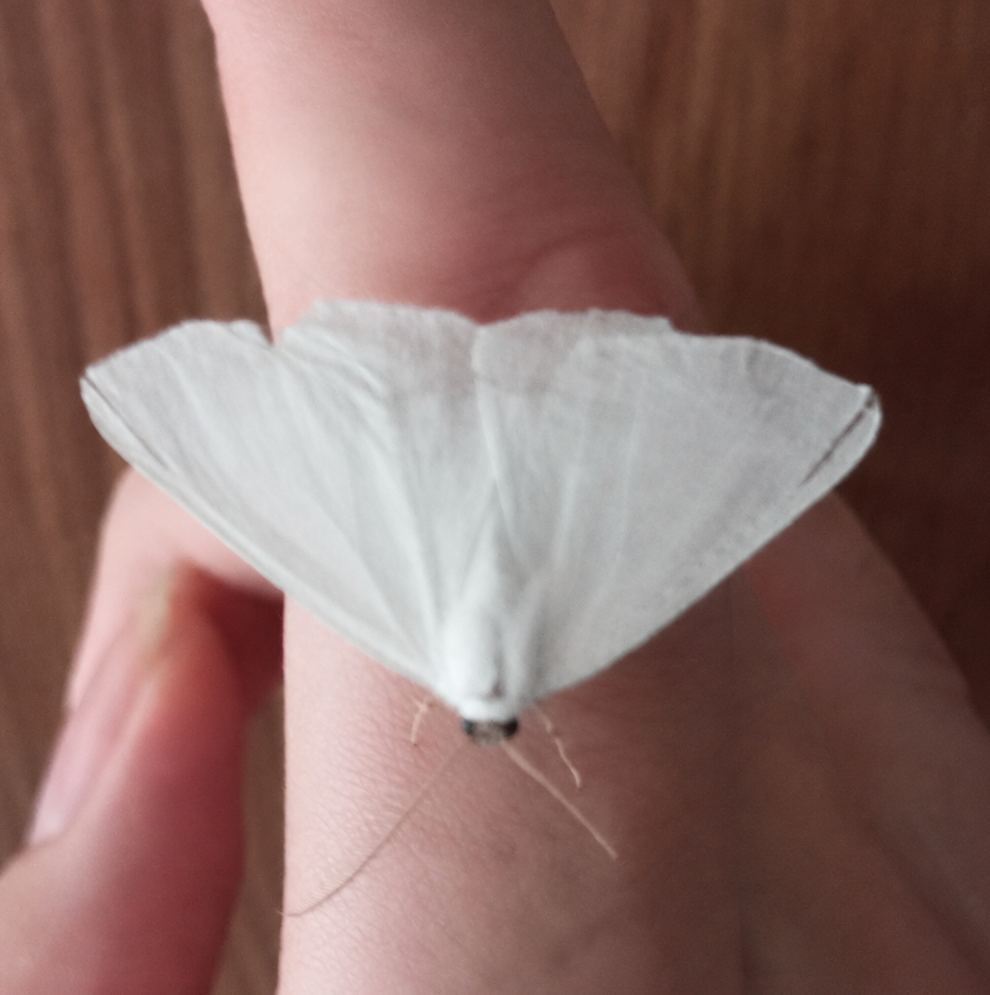
Mocis latipes (species of moth) with unusual white coloration, possibly due to albinism.

The neurohormone [His7]-corazonin induces darkening of the cuticle of Locusta migratoria. The Okinawa strain of this species is deficient in [His7]-corazonin and is albino. One of the typical features of Locusta migratoria is that they are gregarious locusts. However, the albino strain shows more solitarious behaviour.

The yellow mutation in fruit flies is a mutation causing a congenital lack of normal pigment; it is a similar phenomenon to albinism in other organisms.

=== In echinoderms ===
The Japanese sea cucumber (Apostichopus japonicus) is an echinoderm that is caught in the wild or cultivated for food. Normal Japanese sea cucumbers start to develop pigmentation when they are about 1 cm long. The upperside becomes a dull, yellowish -brown to maroon and the underside a light brown. The body walls of adult, albino Japanese sea cucumbers contain only 0.24% melanin compared to 3.12% in normal adults. The difference in melanin content becomes visually apparent at 60 days of age. The epidermis is thinner in the albinos and contains fewer melanocytes. Albino individuals are similar to normal individuals in growth rate, digestion rate and fertility.

Astaxanthin is the main carotenoid in marine crustaceans (and fish). It has been shown that adding astaxanthin to the feed can improve the skin and muscle colour of marine organisms and thereby increase their commercial and ornamental value.

=== In arachnids ===
"Depigmented" arthropods have been found, usually in cave populations. "Albino" individuals of normally red citrus red mites (Panonychus citri) occasionally appear in laboratory colonies, however, these still contain green and yellow pigments. This albinism does not affect mortality.

== Related pigment disorders ==
In some animals, albinism-like conditions may affect other pigments or pigment-production mechanisms:

- "Whiteface", a condition that affects some parrot species, is caused by a lack of psittacins.
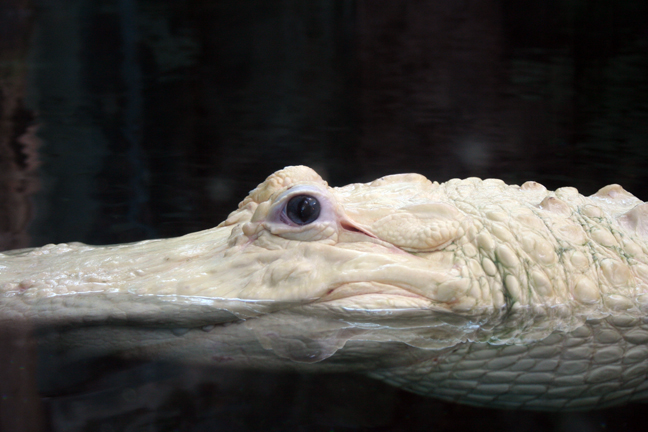
  A leucistic alligator at the Audubon Aquarium of the Americas, New Orleans, Louisiana
- Axanthism is a condition common in reptiles and amphibians, in which xanthophore metabolism is affected rather than synthesis of melanin, resulting in reduction or absence of red and yellow pteridine pigments.
- Leucism differs from albinism in that the melanin is, at least, partially absent but the eyes retain their usual colour. Some leucistic animals are white or pale because of chromatophore (pigment cell) defects, and do not lack melanin.
- Melanism is the direct opposite of albinism. An unusually high level of melanin pigmentation (and sometimes absence of other types of pigment in species that have more than one) results in an appearance darker than non-melanistic specimens from the same gene pool.

== In plants ==
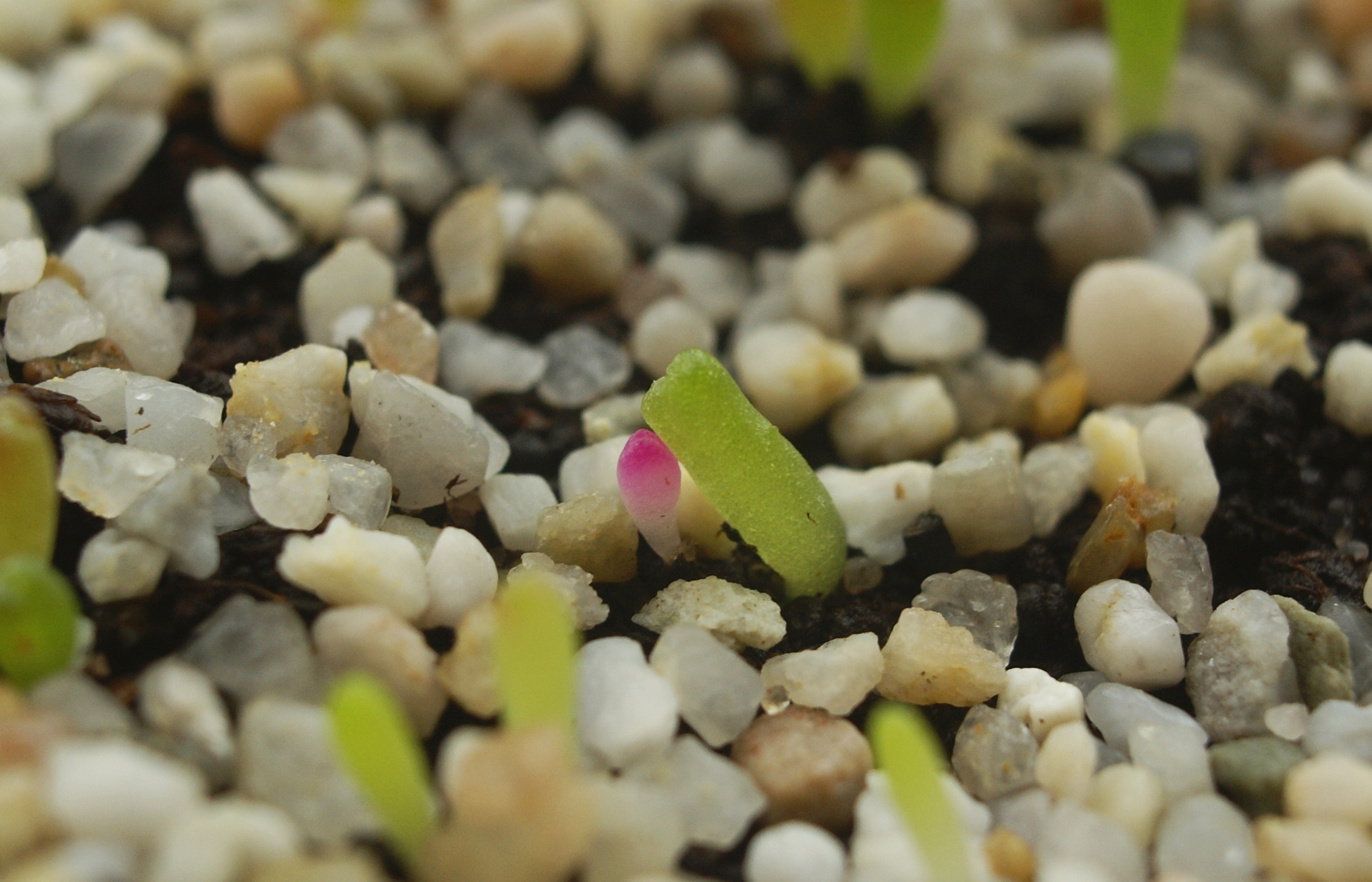
An albino Rebutia seedling. The two seedlings are of the same age, but the albino stopped developing once the seed's reserve was exhausted.

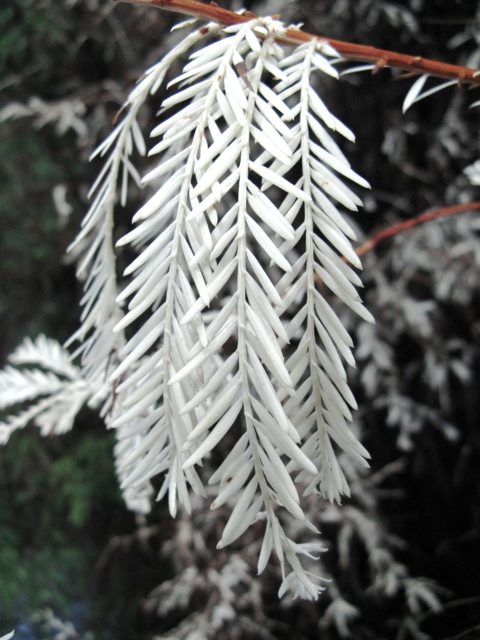
The foliage of an Albino redwood. Note the distinctive white coloration of the needles.

In plants, albinism is characterised by partial or complete loss of chlorophyll pigments and incomplete differentiation of chloroplast membranes. Albinism in plants interferes with photosynthesis, which can reduce survivability. Some plant variations may have white flowers or other parts. However, these plants are not totally devoid of chlorophyll. Terms associated with this phenomenon are "hypochromia" and "albiflora". Plants that are pale simply from being in the dark are termed etiolated.

Albino redwoods are rare examples of an albino tree with white needles; despite its lack of chlorophyll, it may grow to substantial size as a parasite, usually on the base of the (normal) redwood tree from which it first grew. Only about sixty examples of albino redwoods are known. Additionally, an even smaller number of "chimeric" redwood trees have both normal and white needles.

Albinism has frequently occurred in progeny of Black Tartarian, Bing and Hedelfingen varieties of sweet cherry.

Some herbicides (e.g. glyphosate and triazines) can cause partial chlorosis in plants, even several seasons or years after applicating.

== See also ==
- Albinism in chickens
- Albinism in humans
- White squirrel
- Dyschromia
- Erythrism, unusually red pigmentation
- Isabellinism
- Leucism
- Leukoderma
- Melanism, dark pigmentation caused by excess of melanin
- Mongolian spot
- Xanthochromism, unusually yellow pigmentation and oftentimes lack of usual red pigment
