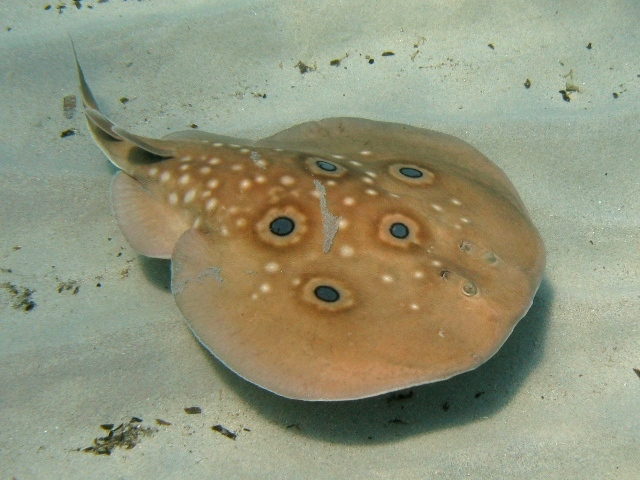

Conservation status
- Vulnerable (IUCN 3.1)

Scientific classification
- Kingdom: Animalia
- Phylum: Chordata
- Class: Chondrichthyes
- Subclass: Elasmobranchii
- Order: Torpediniformes
- Family: Torpedinidae
- Genus: Torpedo
- Species: T. torpedo

Binomial name
- Torpedo torpedo (Linnaeus, 1758)
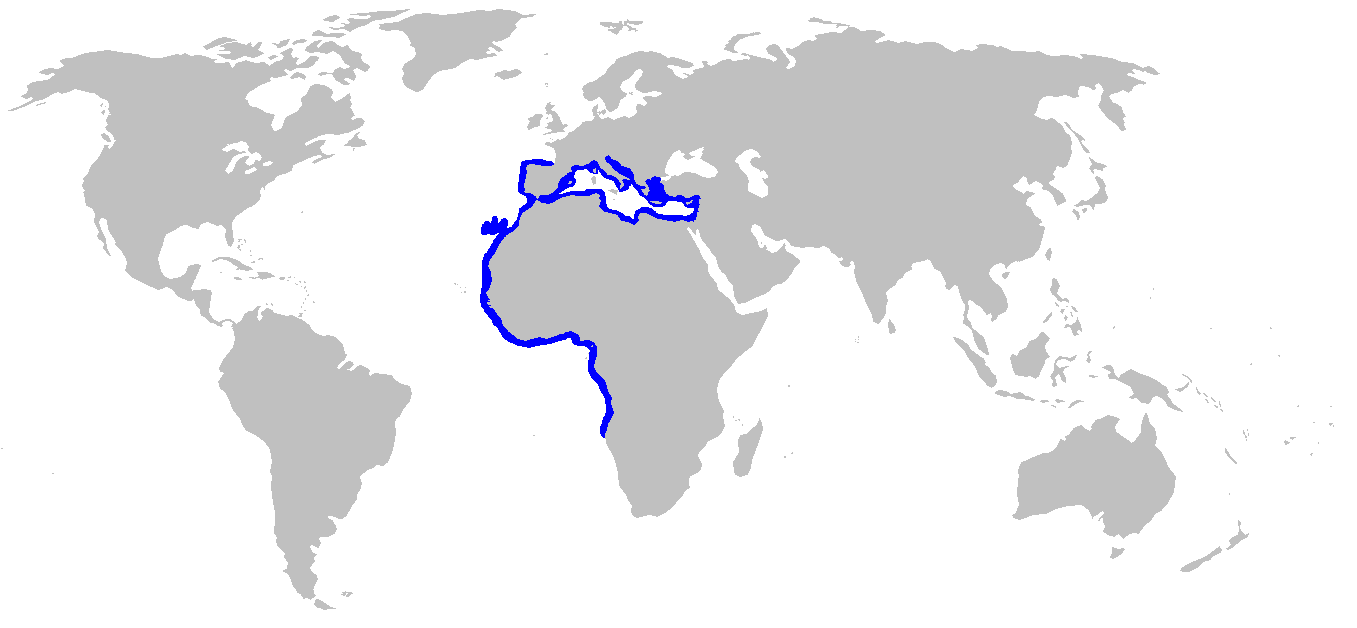
- Range of the common torpedo

Synonyms
- Raja torpedo Linnaeus, 1758; Torpedo narke Delaroche, 1809; Torpedo ocellata Rafinesque, 1810; Torpedo oculata Davy, 1834; Torpedo unimaculata Risso, 1810

= Common torpedo =

Species of cartilaginous fish

The common torpedo (Torpedo torpedo), also known as ocellate torpedo or eyed electric ray, is a species of electric ray in the family Torpedinidae. It is found in the Mediterranean Sea and the eastern Atlantic Ocean from the Bay of Biscay to Angola, and is a benthic fish typically encountered over soft substrates in fairly shallow, coastal waters. Growing to 60 cm (24 in) long, this species has a nearly circular pectoral fin disc and a short, thick tail with two dorsal fins of nearly equal size and a large caudal fin. It can be identified by the prominent blue spots on its back, which usually number five but may vary from zero to nine, as well as by the small knobs on the rims of its spiracles.

For attack and defense, the common torpedo can deliver a strong electric shock of up to 200 volts. It is a solitary, nocturnal ambush predator that feeds mainly on bony fishes and crustaceans. This species is aplacental viviparous, with the developing embryos nourished by yolk and histotroph ("uterine milk") produced by the mother. Females produce litters of up to 28 young every year in late summer or autumn, after a gestation period of 4–8 months; the specifics vary between geographical regions. The common torpedo's shock is painful but otherwise of little danger to humans. Its electrogenic properties led it to be used in medicine by the ancient Greeks and Romans. In modern times, it has no economic value and is mostly discarded when caught as bycatch in fisheries. The impact of fishing on its population is uncertain, and the International Union for Conservation of Nature (IUCN) has listed it as Vulnerable.

== Taxonomy ==
The common torpedo and other electric rays were familiar to the peoples of classical antiquity. Torpedo was the Roman name for electric rays, derived from Latin torpere meaning 'to be numb'. Carl Linnaeus, known as the "father of taxonomy", scientifically described the common torpedo as Raja torpedo in the 1758 tenth edition of his Systema Naturae. However, the common torpedo also appeared in at least 52 pre-Linnaean sources under various names such as Torpedo, Raja tota lævis, Torpedo maculosa, and Torpedo Sinûs Persici. These early accounts, including Linnaeus's, confounded the common torpedo with other electric ray species. As Linnaeus did not indicate any type specimens, the designation of a lectotype or neotype is warranted in the interest of taxonomic stability. This measure has yet to be taken.

Peter Forsskål validly published the genus name Torpedo in 1775, predating the use of the genus name Torpedo by Duméril in 1806, meaning that Torpedo Duméril, 1806 (often cited in catalogs) is a junior homonym of Forsskål's name and cannot be used. Forsskål included only a single species, Raja torpedo Linnaeus, 1758, thereby making it the type species of the genus. While Forsskål's description indicated that he had misinterpreted Linnaeus' name and ascribed it to another electric fish (currently known as Malapterurus electricus), this potential source of confusion was rectified in 2008, when Raja torpedo Linnaeus was officially made the type species under ICZN Article 70.3.1. Within the genus Torpedo, the common torpedo is placed within the subgenus Torpedo, which differs from the other subgenus Tetronarce in having spiracles with papillate rims and ornate dorsal coloration. This species may also be referred colloquially to as crampfish, cramp ray, or torpedo ray.

== Distribution and habitat ==
Native to the eastern Atlantic Ocean, the common torpedo occurs from the Bay of Biscay to Angola. It is present in the Mediterranean Sea as well, with higher densities in the western part of the Basin. A single record from Belgian waters was most likely erroneous. In European waters, it is encountered less frequently than other electric ray species. This species prefers warmer temperatures. It is rare north of the Mediterranean, and within the Mediterranean it is more common off North Africa than off southern Europe. The common torpedo is a bottom-dweller usually found close to shore at depths of 2–70 m (6.6–229.7 ft), though it has occasionally been reported from as deep as 400 m (1,300 ft). It inhabits soft-bottomed habitats such as sandy flats and seagrass beds.

== Description ==
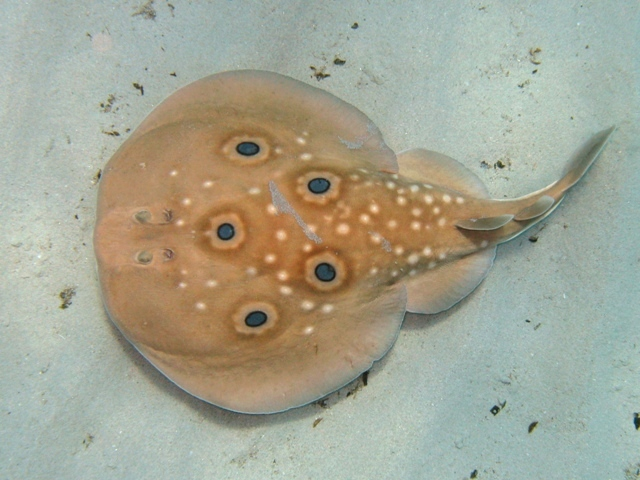
The common torpedo usually has five blue spots on its back, which distinguishes it from other electric rays

The pectoral fin disc of the common torpedo is almost circular in shape and about 1.3–1.4 times wider than long. The front margin of the disc is nearly straight. The two large, kidney-shaped electric organs are visible beneath the skin on either side of the head. The eyes are small and followed by spiracles of comparable size. The lateral and posterior rims of the spiracles bear small, low knobs, which diminish in size with age and may be indiscernible in larger individuals. On the "nape" behind the spiracles, there is a pair of prominent mucous pores. There is a wide, quadrangular flap of skin between the nostrils that almost reaches the mouth. The teeth are small and arranged in a dense quincunx pattern; each tooth has a single sharp cusp. There are around 22–24 and 20–22 tooth rows in the upper and lower jaws respectively. The five pairs of gill slits are placed on the underside of the disc.

The pelvic fins are distinct from the disc and have rounded outer margins. The short and thick tail bears skin folds along either side and two dorsal fins on top. The first dorsal fin is slightly larger than the second. The well-developed caudal fin is triangular with blunt corners, and is approximately as long as the space between it and first dorsal fin. The skin is smooth and soft, entirely lacking dermal denticles. The dorsal coloration of the common torpedo is rusty orange to reddish brown, with distinctive large spots ("ocellae") on the disc; each ocellus is blue and encircled by darker and lighter rings. Typically there are five ocellae arranged symmetrically in a row of three and another of two; rays with 0–4 ocellae are less common, and those with more than five are rarer still. An unusual male with eight ocellae was caught off Tunisia, and another with nine off southern France. When present, the sixth ocellus is similarly sized to the first five and positioned at their center; any additional ocellae tend to be smaller than the first six and placed asymmetrically towards the snout. The underside is cream-colored, with dark disc margins. An adult albino female was captured off Tunisia. Males and females typically measure 30 and 39 cm (12 and 15 in) long respectively; the largest individual on record was 60 cm (24 in) long. Rays from off West Africa grow larger than those from the Mediterranean.

== Biology and ecology ==
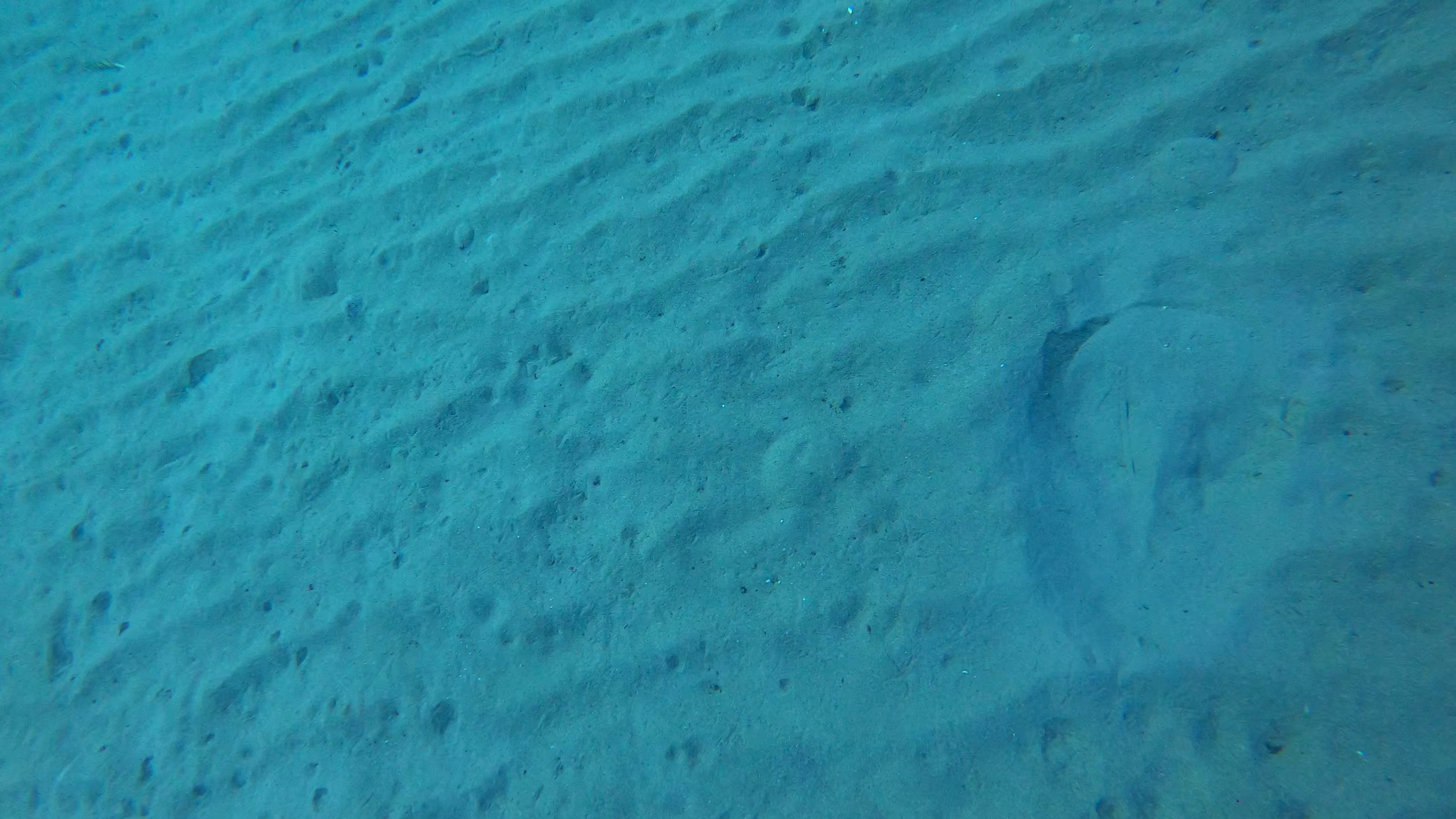
The common torpedo is almost invisible when silted up

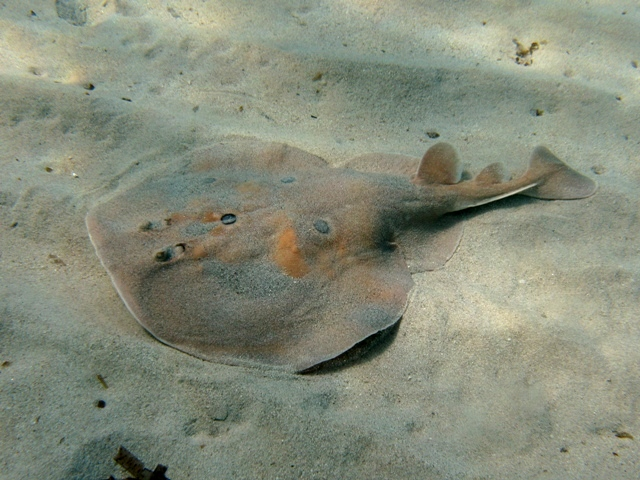
The common torpedo is an ambush predator that lies in wait for prey on the sea bottom

As with other members of its family, the common torpedo can subdue prey and deter threats with strong electric shocks generated from a pair of large electric organs. Derived from muscle tissue, each organ is made up of 400–500 columns, each column constituting a stack of around 400 jelly-filled disks ("electroplaques"). The columns together essentially act as batteries connected in parallel. The discharge of the electric organs can reach 200 volts, and may occur singly or in bursts ("trains"). Experiments in vitro have found that the nerves innervating the electric organ essentially stop functioning at temperatures below 15 °C (59 °F). Winter water temperatures regularly drop below this threshold in the wild, suggesting the ray may not use its electric organs for part of the year, or has a yet-unknown physiological mechanism to adapt electric organ function to colder conditions.

Solitary and nocturnal, the common torpedo spends much time resting on the sea floor, often buried in sediment. It is an ambush predator that pounces onto prey and stuns them with electricity, the process taking only a fraction of a second. Once the prey is immobilized, it is manipulated to the mouth with motions of the disc, and swallowed whole. Adults feed almost entirely on small benthic bony fishes, including soles, herring, mullet, gobies, goatfishes, porgies, dragonets, and jack mackerels. Large decapod crustaceans are a minor secondary food source, while very rarely skates may be consumed. Juveniles are less exclusively piscivorous than the adults and feed on a variety of invertebrates as well. The most significant prey species differ between seasons and geographic regions. For example, in the Tyrrhenian Sea, juvenile common sole (Solea solea) are by far the most important prey item in autumn and winter, but in spring and summer they become less available and other fishes figure more prominently in the ray's diet. Known parasites of this species include the tapeworm Phyllobothrium lactuca, and the monogeneans Amphibdella paronaperugiae and Amphibdelloides benhassinae.

=== Life history ===
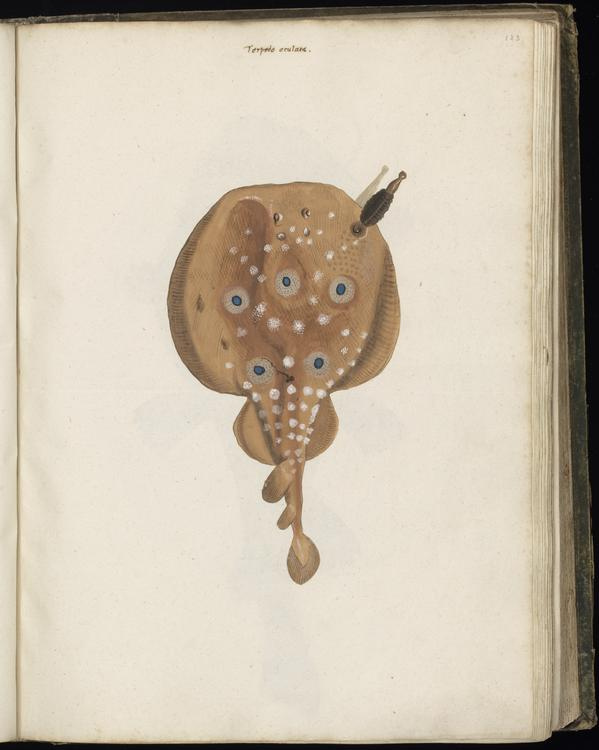
Drawing collected by Felix Platter, anonymous, 1546–1558

The common torpedo is aplacental viviparous, in which the embryos are sustained by yolk, supplemented by histotroph ("uterine milk") secreted by the mother. However, the organic content of the histotroph in this species is only 1.2%, much lower than in stingrays, and the embryo loses mass over the course of development as its initial yolk supply is expended for metabolic processes. Adult females have two functional ovaries and two functional uteruses, though the reproductive tract on the right side is more developed and consequently tends to carry more embryos. It has an annual reproductive cycle with well-defined seasonality, though the details differ between geographic regions. In the Mediterranean, mating occurs from December to February and birthing from late August to early September after a gestation period of 4–6 months; litter sizes range up to 19 and the newborns measure 8.0–9.7 cm (3.1–3.8 in) long. By contrast, off West Africa the gestation period lasts 6–8 months and birthing occurs from September to October; litter sizes range up to 28 and the newborns measure 10.2–12.5 cm (4.0–4.9 in) long. The litter size increases with female size.

Sexual segregation occurs during the breeding season as pregnant females move into shallow coastal waters. The common torpedo is unusual among sharks and rays in that birthing has been documented both at higher and at lower salinities than seawater, in estuaries and lagoons. Immediately after birth, this species is capable of producing electric shocks of up to four volts. Newborns grow rapidly, with a commensurate increase in electrogenic capacity: after four months, they almost double in weight and can generate 26 volts. Males and females mature sexually at similar lengths: 25 and 26 cm (9.8 and 10.2 in) respectively in the Tyrrhenian Sea, 18 and 22 cm (7.1 and 8.7 in) respectively off Egypt, 19 cm (7.5 in) for both off Tunisia, and 30 and 31 cm (12 and 12 in) respectively off Senegal.

== Human interactions ==
The electric shock of the common torpedo can be severe, but is not life-threatening. In classical antiquity, the electrogenic properties of this species led it (and other strongly electric fishes) to be used in medicine for the treatment of pain and diseases such as gout. For example, the Roman physician Scribonius Largus, in his Compositiones medicae (c. 50 AD), recommended that chronic headaches be treated by the application of a live torpedo to the affected area. The common torpedo is edible, but is little-valued by commercial or artisanal fisheries and is mostly discarded when caught. Because of its shallow-water habits, it may survive being captured and discarded relatively well. It is susceptible to several types of demersal fishing gear, including bottom trawls and trammel nets; fishing activity is heavy within its range but no specific data regarding this species are available. The International Union for Conservation of Nature (IUCN) has listed it as Vulnerable. The common torpedo has been kept in aquariums, but requires live fish for food.
