= Claude (alligator) =

American albino alligator (1995–2025)

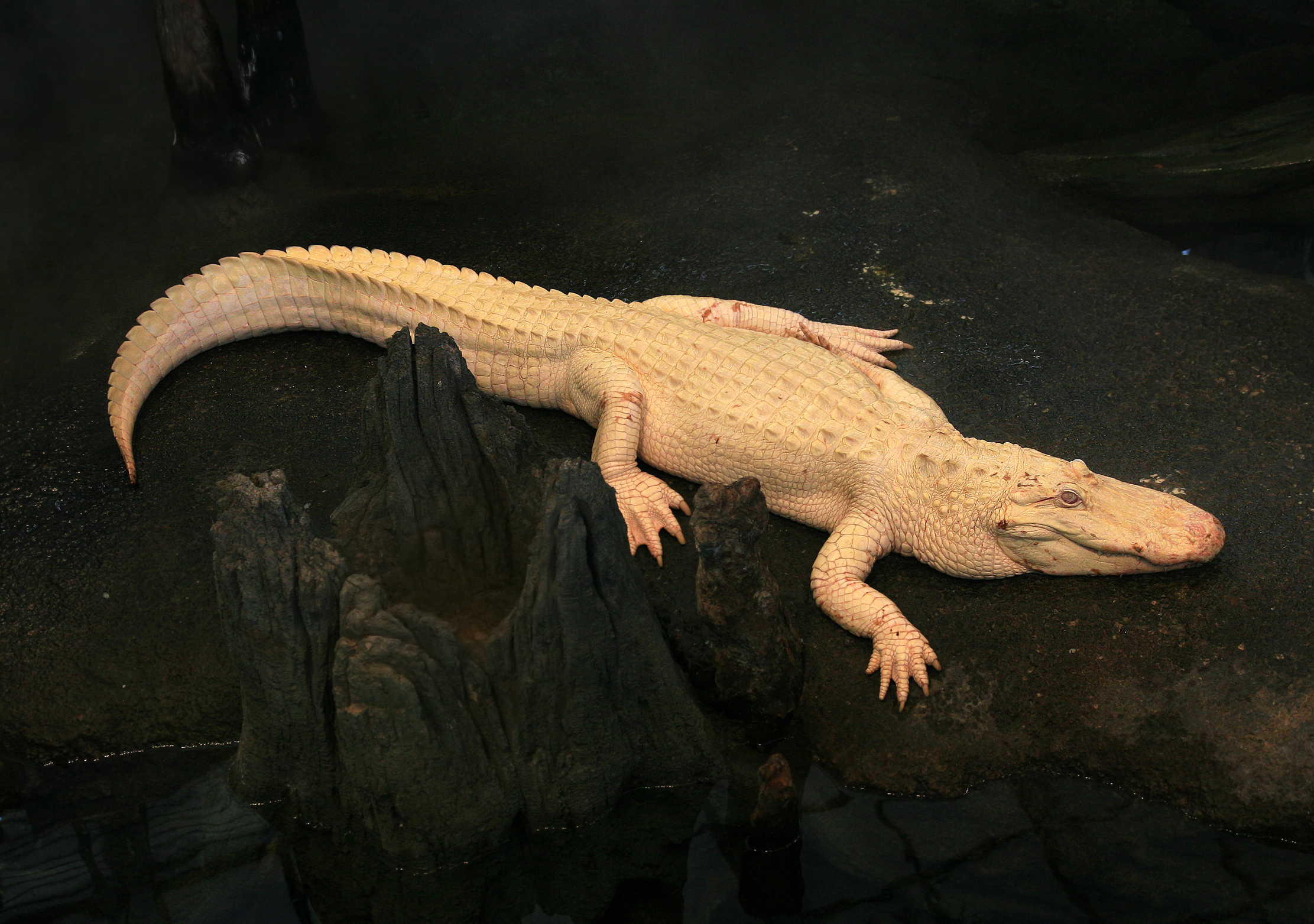
- Claude in 2008 in his swamp at the California Academy of Sciences
- Species: Alligator mississippiensis
- Sex: Male
- Hatched: September 15, 1995; Louisiana, U.S.
- Died: December 2, 2025 (aged 30); San Francisco, California, U.S.
- Owner: California Academy of Sciences
- Weight: 300 lb (140 kg)

Claude (September 15, 1995 – December 2, 2025) was an albino American alligator (Alligator mississippiensis), who was housed at the California Academy of Sciences in San Francisco, California.

== Biography ==
Claude was hatched on September 15, 1995, in Louisiana weighing 2 ounces (57 g) at birth. He was born lacking entirely in pigmentation, a form of albinism which endangered his survival in the wild. (Albino alligators have difficulty blending into their surroundings, and tend to also have poor eyesight, making them "easy pickings for predators") Claude was initially raised at the St. Augustine Alligator Farm Zoological Park in Florida.

Claude was taken to the California Academy of Sciences in 2008. The drivers who transported him from Florida traded shifts and slept in the truck, because Claude and the rattlesnake they were also transporting could not be easily accommodated in a motel. Claude was originally housed with a non-albino female alligator named Bonnie. In January 2009, Bonnie bit one of Claude's right fingers. The finger developed an infection and needed to be amputated. Bonnie was subsequently moved back to Florida. In April 2025, the California Academy of Sciences launched the 'Claude Cam', a 24/7 livestream of Claude. Claude was used as a teaching tool, and eventually came to be a beloved emblem of the Academy of Sciences. He was trained with voice commands and, according to biologist Emma Kocina, knew his name.

Claude weighed 300 pounds (140 kg) and was 10 feet (3.0 m) long by 2025. He had 76 teeth. His albinism made him completely white, with pink eyes, because he lacked the pigment melanin. He had poor eyesight due to his albinism.

Claude died on December 2, 2025, at the age of 30. His appetite had declined prior to his death and he had been treated for a suspected infection; a necropsy revealed that he died of liver cancer.

== In media ==
Claude is the subject of a children's book called Claude: The True Story of a White Alligator.

== Popular significance ==
Claude's 'animal ambassador' role for San Francisco has been compared to the mountain lion P-22 for Los Angeles, Flaco the owl for New York City, and Fiona the hippo for Cincinnati. Following his death, a street in Golden Gate Park was renamed to "Claude the Alligator Way".
