= Black Tartarian =

Edible fruit cultivar

Black Tartarian cherry
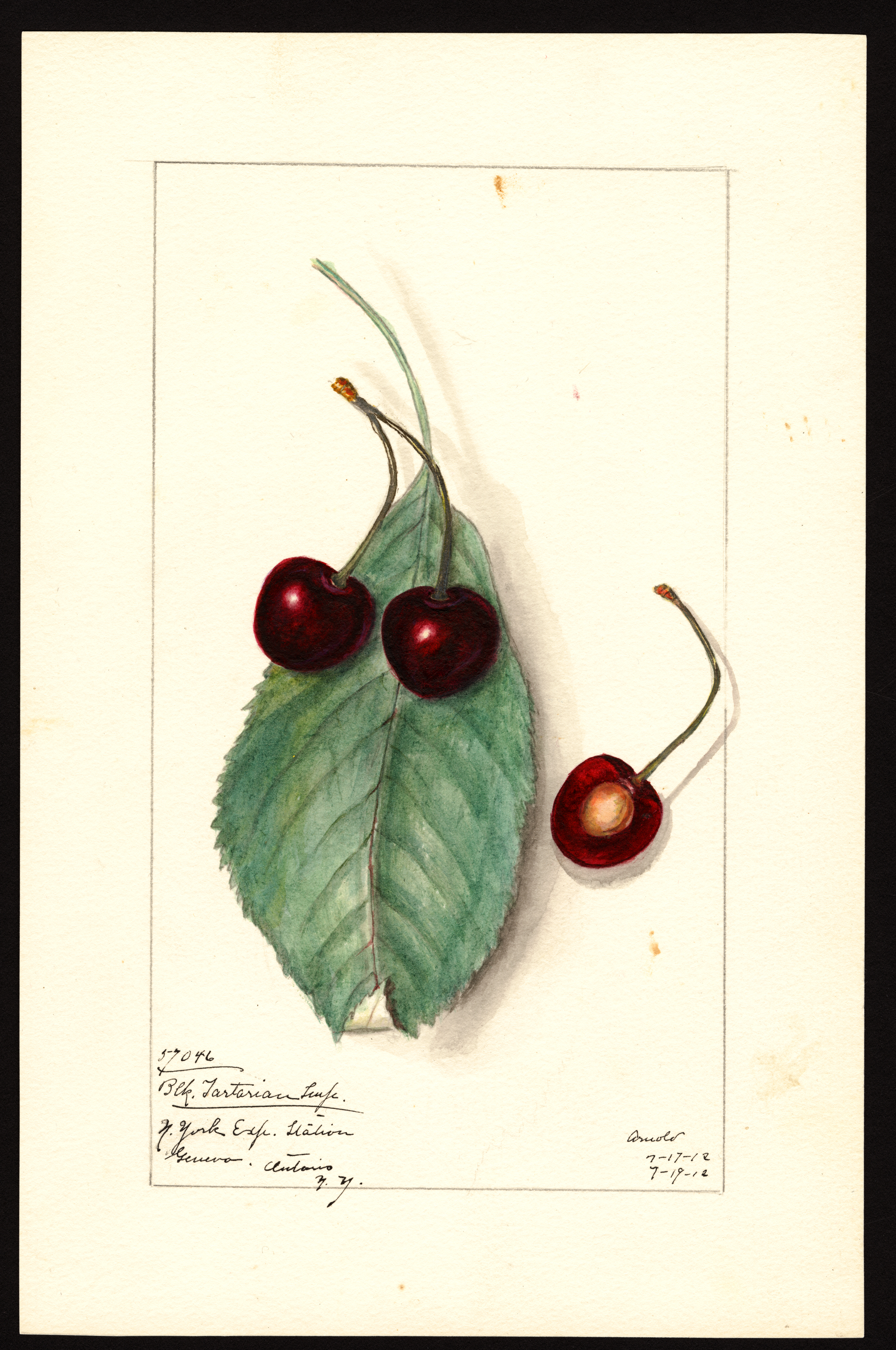
- Image of Black Tartarian cherries, from the USDA Pomological Watercolor Collection
- Genus: Prunus
- Species: Prunus avium
- Cultivar: 'Black Tartarian'
- Origin: Circassia, pre-1700s

Black Tartarian (originally Ronald's Large Black Heart) is an heirloom cultivar of cherry. It was brought from Circassia to England in the 1700s by a man named Hugh Ronalds, and from England it was brought to the United States in the 1800s.

The fruit of the Black Tartarian is about one inch in diameter, with a unique taste and texture, but too soft for commercial shipping. It is primarily grown as a pollinizer for other cherry varieties.

== Plant facts ==
The Black Tartarian cultivar is best suited for USDA Zones 5–7. It is a very vigorous, heavy-bearing variety, but is primarily used as a pollenizer for other dark, sweet varieties of cherry.
