= Oculocutaneous albinism type I =

- Other names: OCA1A or OCAIA
- Symptoms: Decreased or absent pigmentation of the hair, skin, and eyes.
- Usual onset: Is inherited and phenotypically present beginning at birth
- Types: OCA 1-7
- Causes: Mutation in the TYR gene on chromosome 11
- Treatment: No currently known treatment
- Frequency: Autosomal Recessive Pattern, 1/20,000 people in world

Oculocutaneous albinism type I or type 1A is form of the autosomal recessive condition oculocutaneous albinism that is caused by a dysfunction in the gene for tyrosinase (symbol TYR or OCA1).

The location of OCA1 may be written as "11q1.4–q2.1", meaning it is on chromosome 11, long arm, somewhere in the range of band 1, sub-band 4, and band 2, sub-band 1. Since the disorder is autosomal recessive, genetic counseling can be used to determine if both parents are heterozygous for the condition when considering having children. If both parents are heterozygous, their child has a 25% chance of inheriting both recessive copies of OCA1 and having the condition.

OCA1 is defined by an absence of pigmentation throughout the body, including the eyes, hair, and skin. This rare condition is found in 1 out of 20,000 people around the world, being much more prevalent in Caucasians. Whilst there is no known cure for the condition, there are established ways to manage life with OCA1, including safety in the sun, and regular checks for skin diseases such as skin cancer.

== Signs and symptoms ==
OCA is characterized by the absence of pigmentation caused by the mutation that effects the production of tyrosinase that causes partial or total absence of melanin in the hair, skin, and eyes. Reduction in melanin production specifically in the peripheral retina during embryonic development can trigger other symptoms such as abnormal nerve fiber projection that causes defects in neuronal migration that interrupts visual pathways and creates reduced visual acuity in the range of 20/60 to 20/400. This vision acuity is dependent upon the amount of pigmentation in the eye. Acuity is usually better in individuals with greater amounts of pigment. Aside from decreased pigment in the iris and retina, optic changes include decreased visual acuity, misrouting of the optic nerves at the chiasm, and nystagmus.

OCA1 is the most severe form of albinism, in which the unpigmented iris is translucent and the eye appears blue or mauve in ambient light, pink or red in bright light, and in which the skin has no pigmentation at all (unlike other forms of albinism, in which there is some residual pigmentation). OCA1 is caused by mutations in the TYR gene, where there is a complete lack of tyrosinase activity.

== Genetics ==
The tyrosinase (TYR) gene is located on chromosome 11q14. This protein coding gene produces tyrosinase, an enzyme which catalyzes a total of three steps in the conversion of tyrosine to the end product, melanin. This enzyme and conversion process takes place within melanocytes, which are specialized cells for melanin production. Melanin is a large group of molecules that give skin, eyes, and hair their respective colors. It is also partially responsible for vision, as it protects the light sensitive portion of the eye, the retina, through absorbing light. OCA Type 1A is an autosomal recessive condition, meaning there is a homozygous or compound heterozygous mutation related to the TYR gene. There are many different types of albinism, differing due to the effects of various mutations. Oculocutaneous albinism type IA is the most severe type of albinism, as it is characterized by no melanin production. Other types of albinism have limited melanin production. Because type IA Albinism has no functioning copies of the gene, it is the most severe type of albinism. The mutations on this gene lead to a complete lack of tyrosinase activity as the inactive enzyme is produced. An inactive enzyme can be caused by a missense or nonsense mutation. Due to the lack of enzymes needed to catalyze the production of melanin, patients do not have melanin protecting them from the sun, resulting in sensitive eyes, skin, and other symptoms mentioned in the signs and symptoms of OCA1A. The different forms of albinism and range of severity is dependent upon the level of melanin production, which depends on the level of tyrosinase activity.

== Diagnosis ==
Because albinism is autosomal recessive, prenatal genetic screening and genetic counseling can be performed to diagnose OCA early on. When pathogenic variants are known to be present in an affected family, carrier testing can also be conducted. The level of expression can be variable depending on the pigmentation background, so phenotypically, OCA can be expressed on a spectrum. OCA is heterogenous, with OCA1 being caused by a mutation in the TYR gene. The separate subdivisions are categorized by the genes that they effect. The seven types are not evenly distributed amongst ethnic groups with OCA1 being the subtype most prominent in Caucasians - "accounting for approximately 50% of cases worldwide."

Previously, diagnosis was done from observation of hypopigmentation which is obvious at birth, but this is now insufficient early on to distinguish between the seven major types of OCA.

Prenatal testing has been achieved through fetal skin biopsy followed by subsequent histologic and electron microscope examination for melanin levels. Clinical findings have established that molecular genetic testing of TYR, the gene encoding tyrosinase, can distinguish between 1A and 1B because the phenotypes can be identical during the first year of life. OCA1A results in complete loss of tyrosinase enzyme activity. Individuals with 1B will experience increased pigmentation with age because they have a very low level of melanin production that can increase. The histological approach for prenatal diagnosis is useful for all families at risk for OCA1 whereas the molecular genetic test is only helpful when at least one mutation is known.

== Management ==
There is currently no treatment for this disease. The extremely hypopigmented skin that is characteristic in OCA1 particularly leads to risk of skin damage and non-melanotic skin cancers due to increased sensitivity to UV rays. In OCA1B, because there is some presence of melanin, it grows with age and pigmentation can increase; the same cannot be said for OCA1A. Individuals affected by OCA1A should be attentive to the amount of sun exposure they experience and wear proper protection such as clothing that covers the skin. Additionally, individuals may need corrective visual aids for their visual acuity of 1/10 or less with intense photophobia. Visual aids can both improve vision or protect eyes from bright lights. These visual aids can be adjusted for based on individual needs.

Individuals should receive annual skin evaluation to access for damage or skin cancers that can be induced from sun exposure. In some situations, therapy or surgery can correct crossed eyes (strabismus) or rapid eye movements (nystagmus).

== Epidemiology ==
The highest frequency of Albinism type IA is in Northern Ireland, with a phenotype frequency of around 1: 10,000. First cousin - marriages accounted for 4.5% of the parents of patients. Additionally, symptoms that could be heterozygous mutations, such as abnormal iris translucency occurred in 70% of the parents and children of individuals affected with this condition. In general, the phenotypical appearance of OCA1A is associated with northern and western Europe. This is because over 50% of OCA1 subjects are Caucasians. OCA1 is also the most common form of Albinism in China and Japan. The overall frequency is 1: 20,000 people in the world.
