= Shortlip electric ray =

Conservation status
- Vulnerable (IUCN 3.1)

Scientific classification
- Kingdom: Animalia
- Phylum: Chordata
- Class: Chondrichthyes
- Subclass: Elasmobranchii
- Order: Torpediniformes
- Family: Narcinidae
- Genus: Narcine
- Species: N. brevilabiata

Binomial name
- Narcine brevilabiata Besednov, 1966

Species of cartilaginous fish

The shortlip electric ray (Narcine brevilabiata), is a species of electric ray in the numbfish family, Narcinidae. It may be synonymous with the blackspotted numbfish, Narcine maculata. The shortlip electric ray is found in shallow continental shelf waters offshore of China, Malaysia, Thailand, and Vietnam, at a depth of 41 to 70 meters. It is assessed as Vulnerable on the IUCN Red List, as it is caught as by-catch in large numbers by shrimp trawling fisheries operating throughout its range.

The shortlip electric ray has a rounded pectoral fin disc, with a tail not longer than the disc. Unlike most species of Narcine, the second dorsal fin of N. brevilabiata is smaller than the first. The forward part of the pelvic fins are expanded into long lobes, while their rear margins are concave. The tooth bands are exposed and subtriangular in shape, with the upper clearly wider than the lower. It has small, dark spots and blotches above, with a few much larger circular spots. There are numerous small spots on the tail. Male adult size appears to vary with locality; a male from the Gulf of Thailand possessed firm claspers 23 cm long, while a male from Vietnam had proportionally longer, flexible claspers at 25.7 mm long. Female size at maturity is unknown.
