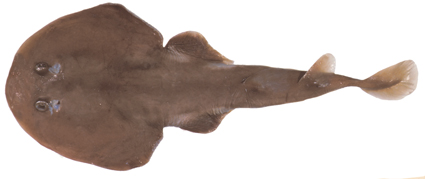
- Preserved specimen

Conservation status
- Least Concern (IUCN 3.1)

Scientific classification
- Kingdom: Animalia
- Phylum: Chordata
- Class: Chondrichthyes
- Subclass: Elasmobranchii
- Order: Torpediniformes
- Family: Narcinidae
- Genus: Narcinops
- Species: N. tasmaniensis

Binomial name
- Narcinops tasmaniensis Richardson, 1841
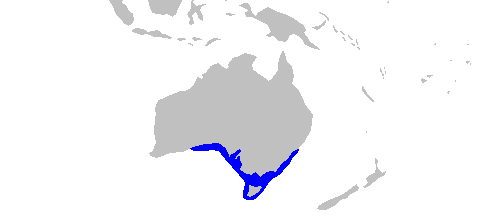
- Geographic range (blue)

Synonyms
- Narcine tasmaniensis

= Tasmanian numbfish =

Species of cartilaginous fish

The Tasmanian numbfish (Narcinops tasmaniensis) is a species of electric ray in the family Narcinidae. Endemic to southeastern Australia, this common ray inhabits shallow continental shelf waters in the southern portion of its range and deeper continental slope waters in the northern portion of its range. It prefers sand and mud habitats. This species can be identified by its spade-shaped pectoral fin disc with concave anterior margins, long tail with well-developed skin folds along either side, and plain dark brown dorsal colouration. Its maximum known length is 47 cm (19 in).

Bottom-dwelling and sedentary, the Tasmanian numbfish feeds mainly on polychaete worms and crustaceans. As in all numbfishes, it can produce a moderate electric shock to defend itself against predators. This species gives live birth, with the unborn young sustained to term by yolk; the litter size ranges from one to eight. The Tasmanian numbfish is a common bycatch of trawl fisheries. However, its population does not appear to be threatened by human activity and it has been assessed as Least Concern by the International Union for Conservation of Nature (IUCN).

== Taxonomy and phylogeny ==
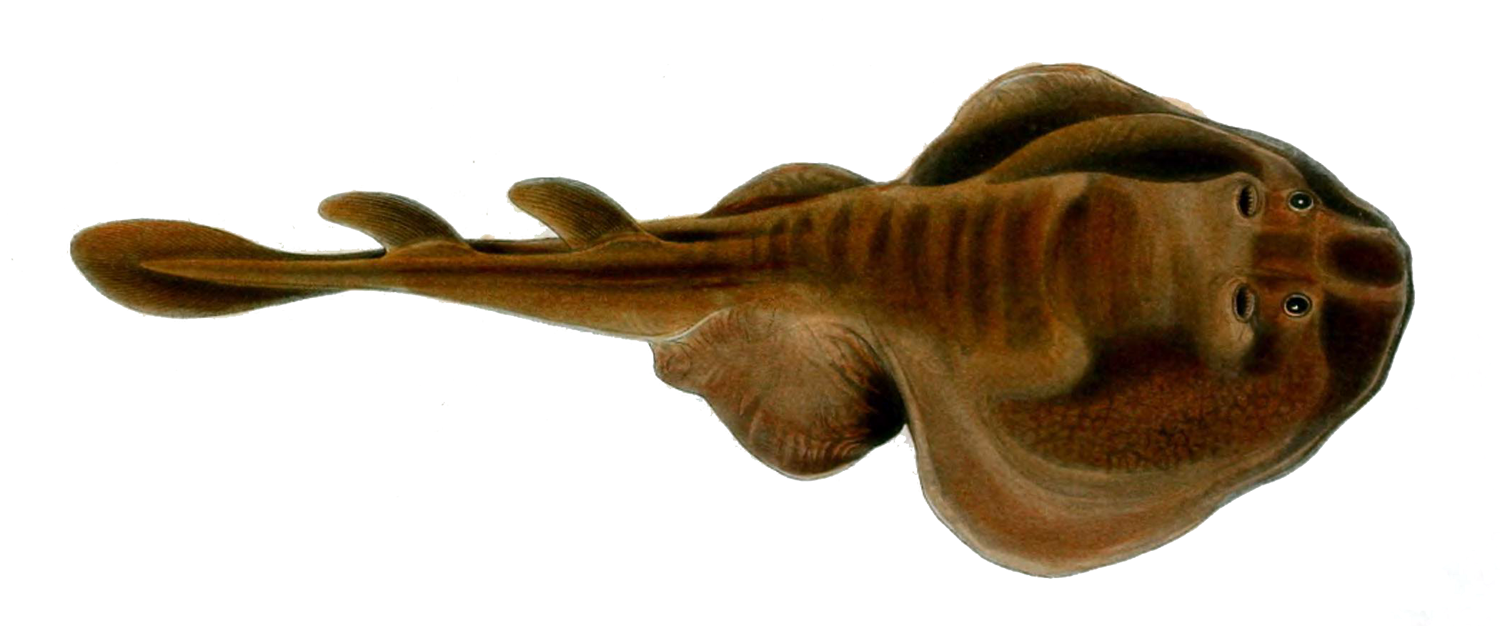
Illustration of the Tasmanian numbfish holotype by John Richardson, author of the species description

Scottish naturalist John Richardson described the Tasmanian numbfish in an 1841 contribution to Proceedings of the Zoological Society of London. Classifying the new species in the genus Narcine, he gave it the specific epithet tasmaniensis as the holotype, a female 36 cm (14 in) long, was collected from Port Arthur, Tasmania. Richardson noted that the ray was known locally as "ground shark". Other common names for this species include electric ray, electric torpedo, little numbfish, and numbfish. In a 2012 phylogenetic study based on mitochondrial DNA, Narcine was found to be polyphyletic, with the Tasmanian numbfish belonging to a different lineage than the giant electric ray (N. entemedor). In 2016, the Tasmanian numbfish was re-classified as a part of the resurrected genus, Narcinops.

== Description ==
Reaching a length of at least 47 cm (19 in), the Tasmanian numbfish has a trowel-shaped pectoral fin disc with a short, blunt snout and concave leading margins. The medium-sized eyes are followed by smaller, nearly circular spiracles with smooth rims. A pair of large electric organs are located on either side of the head. There is a curtain of skin between the nostrils with a three-lobed posterior margin. The narrow, highly protrusible mouth is encircled by a deep groove. The teeth are small and diamond-shaped with pointed tips; they are arranged with a quincunx pattern into bands, which remain exposed when the mouth is closed. There are five pairs of gill slits beneath the disc.

The triangular pelvic fins are much longer than wide; adult males have claspers that extend past the pelvic fin rear tips. The broad and flattened tail is about a quarter longer than the disc and bears prominent skin folds along both sides. There are two dorsal fins of roughly equal size and shape, with the first originating over the rear tips of the pelvic fins. The tail terminates in a low caudal fin; the upper caudal fin lobe is somewhat angular, especially in adult males, while the lower lobe is rounded. The skin often bears creases and is devoid of dermal denticles. The Tasmanian numbfish is plain dark brown above, becoming lighter on the fins. The underside is white, sometimes with a few dark blotches. Many juveniles also exhibit a darker midline stripe along the back, along with darker blotches over the disc and at the dorsal fin bases.

== Distribution and habitat ==
The Tasmanian numbfish is common off southeastern Australia; its range extends from Coffs Harbour in New South Wales to the Esperance Plains in Western Australia, and encompasses all of Tasmania. Around Tasmania, it can be found from inshore waters to a depth of 100 m (330 ft) on the continental shelf. In more northerly waters, it inhabits the upper continental slope at depths of 200–640 m (660–2,100 ft). This bottom-dwelling species favours a sandy or muddy substrate and is sometimes encountered in the vicinity of rocky reefs. Mature rays of both sexes appear to live apart from juveniles.

== Biology and ecology ==
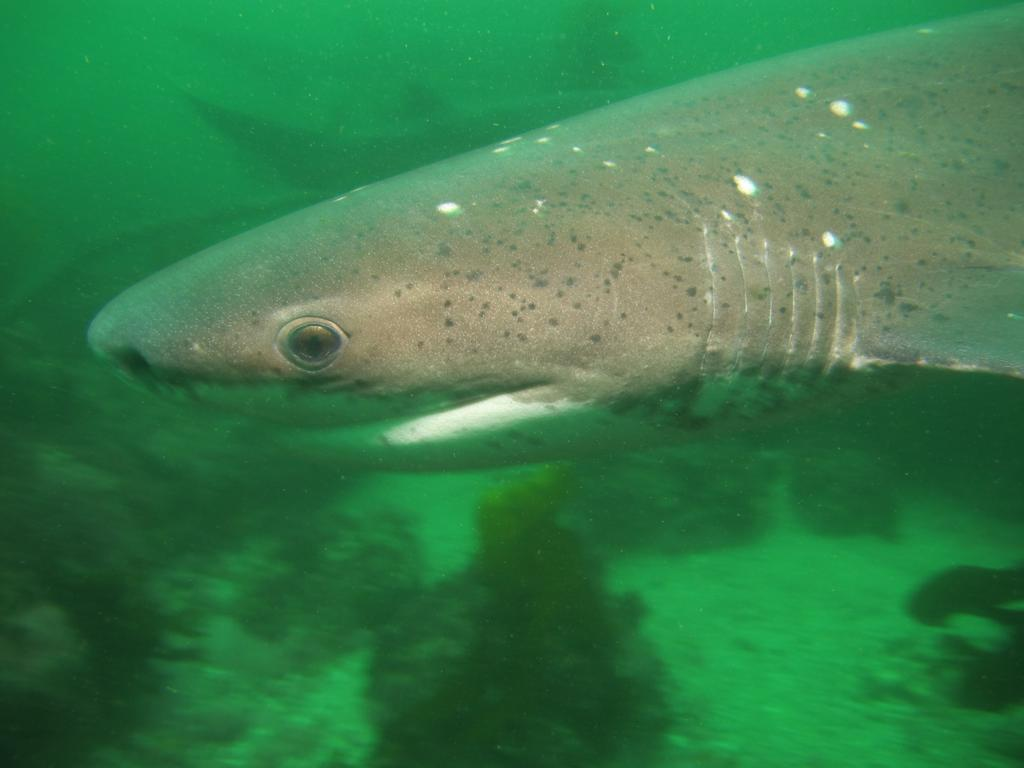
The Tasmanian numbfish is preyed upon by the broadnose sevengill shark (pictured).

The Tasmanian numbfish is a fairly inactive species that spends long periods of time buried motionless in sediment. It feeds primarily on polychaete worms (particularly those of the family Maldanidae) and crustaceans (including amphipods, decapods, and tanaids). Nematodes and sipunculids may also be consumed on rare occasions. Juvenile rays consume polychaetes and crustaceans in roughly equal proportions, while adults consume mostly polychaetes. This dietary shift may reflect increasing experience with age, as polychaetes are burrowing animals and thus more difficult to locate and capture than crustaceans. Like other members of its family, the Tasmanian numbfish can defend itself with a modest electric shock. Its predators include the broadnose sevengill shark (Notorynchus cepedianus). The tapeworm Anthobothrium hickmani is a parasite of this species.

Reproduction in the Tasmanian numbfish is viviparous, with the developing embryos nourished to term via their yolk sacs. Females bear litters of one to eight pups (average eight); newborns measure 9–12 cm (3.5–4.7 in) long. Males and females attain reproductive maturity at lengths of 21–26 cm (8.3–10.2 in) and 20–26 cm (7.9–10.2 in) respectively.

== Human interactions ==
The Tasmanian numbfish is frequently caught incidentally by trawlers of Australia's South East Trawl Fishery, which operate throughout its range. It is discarded after capture with an unknown, but probably high, rate of survival. Although numbfish can deliver an electric shock if they are handled, it is relatively weak compared with the shocks delivered by other electric rays, therefore they are considered relatively harmless. This species does not appear to be threatened by human activity, so the International Union for Conservation of Nature (IUCN) has listed it under Least Concern.
