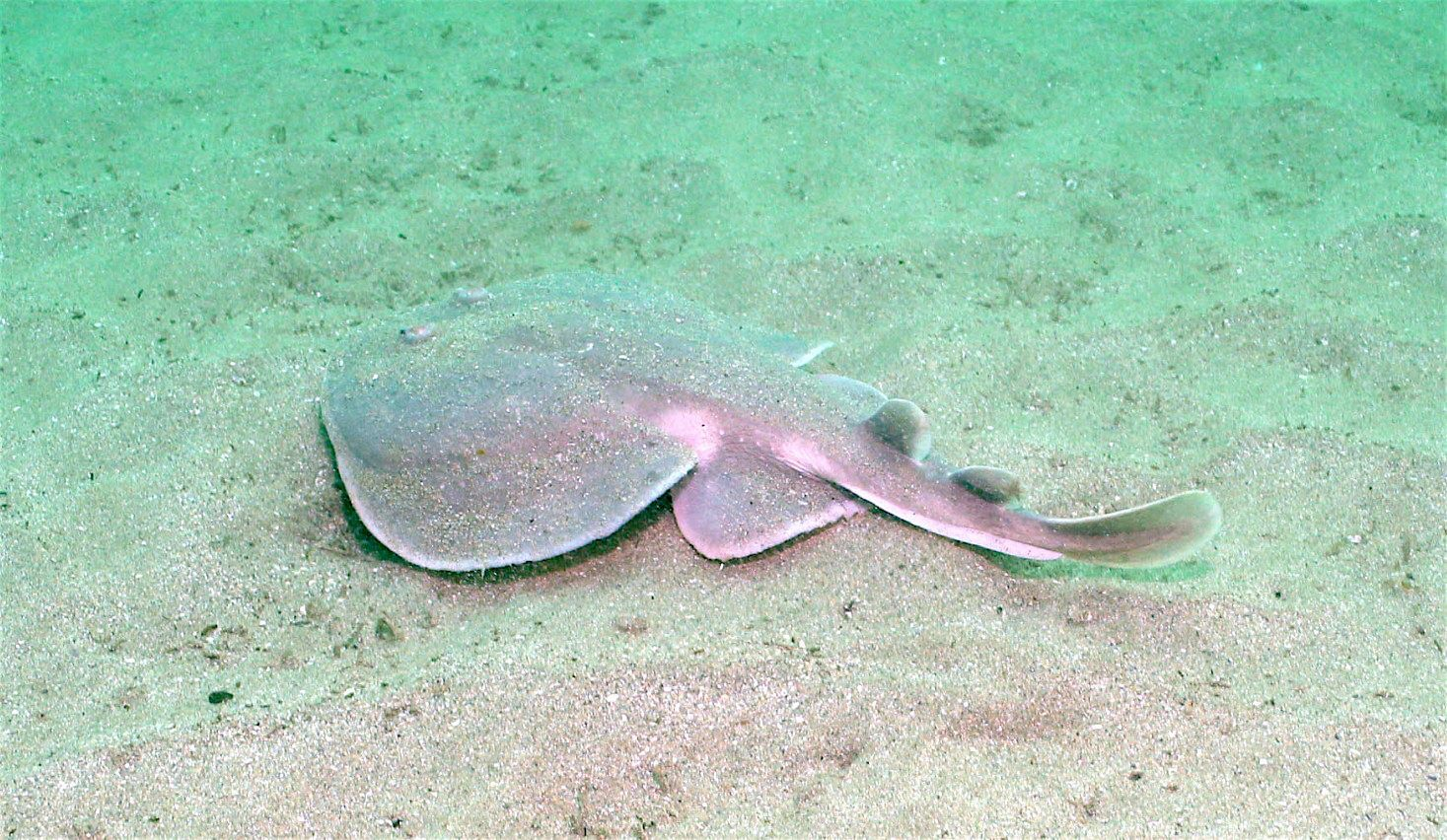

Conservation status
- Least Concern (IUCN 3.1)

Scientific classification
- Kingdom: Animalia
- Phylum: Chordata
- Class: Chondrichthyes
- Subclass: Elasmobranchii
- Order: Torpediniformes
- Family: Narcinidae
- Genus: Discopyge
- Species: D. tschudii

Binomial name
- Discopyge tschudii Heckel in Tschudi, 1846

Synonyms
- Torpedo chilensis Guichenot, 1848

= Apron ray =

Genus of cartilaginous fishes

The apron ray (Discopyge tschudii) is a small electric ray in the numbfish family, Narcinidae, known for being able to generate electric shocks for defense. It is one of two species in the genus Discopyge.

== Distribution and habitat ==
The apron ray is a coldwater marine species found off South America south of the 33°S parallel. It occurs in the southwest Atlantic Ocean along the coasts of Uruguay and Argentina, with small numbers entering southern Brazil in the winter, and in the southeast Pacific Ocean along the coasts of Chile and Peru. The Atlantic and Pacific subpopulations are assumed to be separate, as the Atlantic subpopulation does not occur south of northern Argentina. The depths where it can be found range from 22–181 metres (72–594 ft). It lives on the continental shelf and prefers sandy substrate.

== Description ==
In form, the apron ray resembles the genus Narcine in having a circular pectoral fin disc, two dorsal fins, and a stout tail with lateral folds. Its distinguishing feature is its pelvic fins, which are merged beneath the tail to form a continuous disc. The maximum length reported for the apron ray is a 54 centimetres (21 in) male; the females attain maturity at 27.5 centimetres (10.8 in) and the males at 35–46 centimetres (14–18 in).

== Biology ==
Apron rays are bottom-dwelling fish that are reported to be gregarious in nature. An analysis of stomach contents conducted by Arrighetti et al. (2005) showed that the primary food item in some 90% of apron rays are the siphon tips of the bivalve Amiantis purpurata. The sizes of the clams "grazed" in this way fell into small and large categories, corresponding to small and large rays, with males nipping longer pieces of siphon than the females. Another source gives the main diet of this species as polychaete worms and gammarid amphipods. The apron ray is ovoviviparous; litters range from 1-12 pups but 4-5 are the most common. The pups measure 8.5–9.2 centimetres (3.3–3.6 in) long.

== Conservation ==
The apron ray is caught infrequently as a by-catch of bottom trawl fisheries; it is of low commercial value and is discarded or used for fish meal. Research trawling conducted off Buenos Aires Province and Uruguay documented an 88% decline in this species from 1994-1999. However, the distribution of the species underwent a shift during this time, so it is unclear whether the decline could be attributed to the dramatic increase of unregulated commercial fishing in the region. Globally, the species is considered least concern.

Along with other electric rays, the apron ray is important to neuroscience in the study of cholinergic synaptic transmissions, due to the high concentration of acetylcholine receptor and acetylcholinesterase in the cells of their electric organs.
