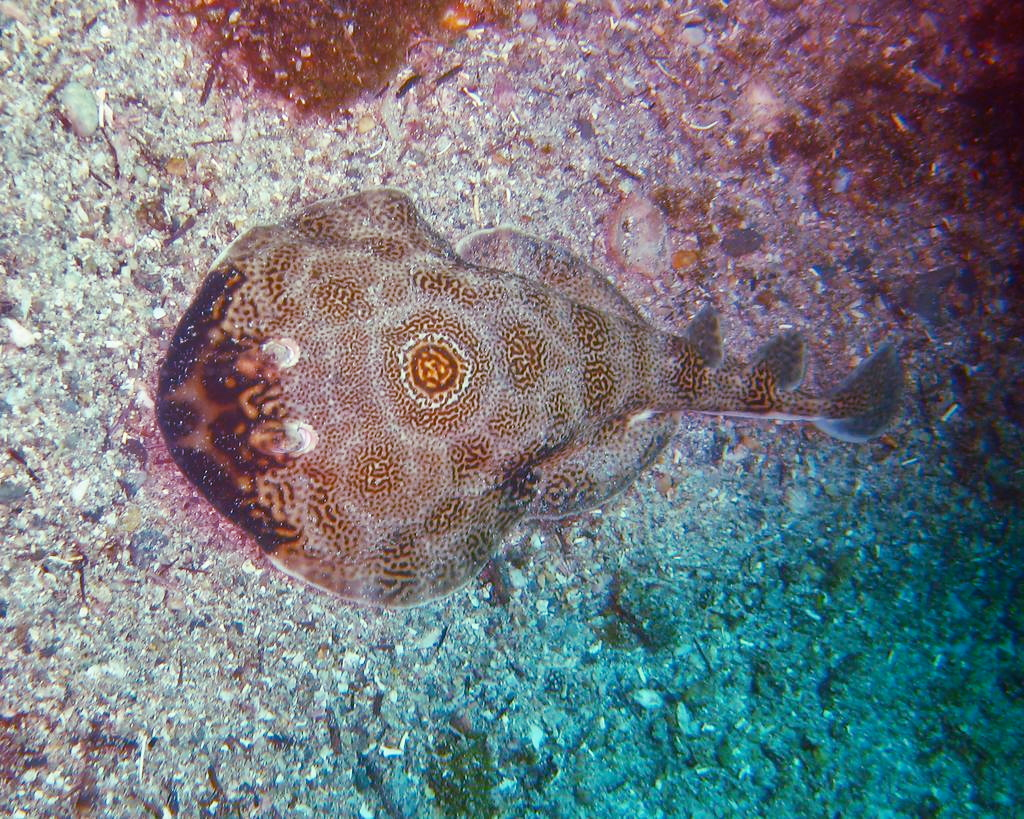

Conservation status
- Least Concern (IUCN 3.1)

Scientific classification
- Kingdom: Animalia
- Phylum: Chordata
- Class: Chondrichthyes
- Subclass: Elasmobranchii
- Order: Torpediniformes
- Family: Narcinidae
- Genus: Diplobatis
- Species: D. ommata

Binomial name
- Diplobatis ommata (D. S. Jordan & C. H. Gilbert, 1890)
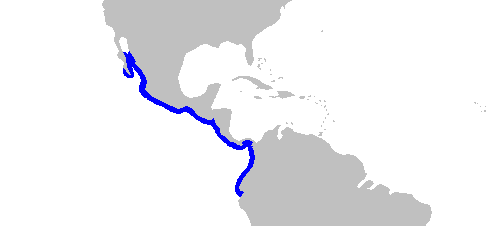
- Range of the ocellated electric ray

Synonyms
- Discopyge ommata D. S. Jordan & Gilbert, 1890; Narcine ommata Clark, 1936

= Ocellated electric ray =

Species of cartilaginous fish

The ocellated electric ray or bullseye electric ray (Diplobatis ommata) is a species of electric ray in the family Narcinidae, native to the shallow inshore waters of the eastern central Pacific from the Gulf of California to Ecuador. Reaching 25 cm (9.8 in) in length, this species has a rounded pectoral fin disc and pelvic fins with convex margins. Its short and thick tail bears two dorsal fins and terminates in a triangular caudal fin. The ocellated electric ray is named for the distinctive large eyespot on the middle of its disc, consisting of a black or yellow center surrounded by concentric rings. Its dorsal coloration is otherwise highly variable, ranging from plain to ornately patterned on a light to dark brown background. The front part of its disc is darker brown.

Solitary and nocturnal in nature, the ocellated electric ray is a bottom-dweller found in sandy and rocky habitats. It moves along the bottom by "hopping" on its pelvic fins, and feeds on small crustaceans and polychaete worms. For defense, it can generate an electrical discharge from its electric organs. This species probably bears live young that are sustained by yolk and later histotroph ("uterine milk") during gestation. The International Union for Conservation of Nature (IUCN) has listed the ocellated electric ray as least concern. It is susceptible to the heavy trawling activity within its limited range.

== Taxonomy ==
American ichthyologists David Starr Jordan and Charles Henry Gilbert described the ocellated electric ray in an 1890 article for the scientific journal Proceedings of the United States National Museum. Their account was based on a female specimen caught by the United States Fish Commission steamer USS Albatross in 1888. The female was collected off the Pacific coast of Colombia at a depth of 60 m (200 ft). Gilbert had previously obtained a specimen from Panama in 1882, but it had been destroyed in a fire before it could be studied. Jordan and Gilbert named the new species ommata (Greek for "eyed") in reference to the distinctive spot on its back, and assigned it to the genus Discopyge. In 1948, Henry Bryant Bigelow and William Charles Schroeder created the new genus Diplobatis for this species based on then-unique subdivision of its nostrils. Three other species of Diplobatis have since been described from the Atlantic. The Atlantic species more closely resemble each other in morphology than they do the ocellated electric ray, though as a whole all four Diplobatis species are extremely similar. Another common name for this species is "target ray".

== Description ==
The pectoral fin disc of the ocellated electric ray is heart- or trowel-shaped and slightly wider than long. A pair of large, kidney-shaped electric organs are visible through the skin on either side of the head. The small eyes are followed by smaller spiracles, which have seven to ten small, rounded projections on their rims. The snout is broadly rounded, with each nostril divided into two openings by a strut. Between the nostrils is a curtain of skin with a smooth to gently wavy posterior margin. The small mouth forms a transverse line; the edge of the lower jaw is scalloped, and when closed usually conceals the teeth. There are 14–16 tooth rows in each jaw. The small and pointed teeth become progressively longer and sharper towards the back, and are arranged in a quincunx pattern. Five pairs of small gill slits are present on the underside of the disc.

The large pelvic fins originate beneath the disc and have convex trailing margins. Adult males have very short and thick claspers. The broad and flattened tail is shorter than the disc and bears a fold of skin along either side. There are two small dorsal fins, both with rounded to angular apices; the first is slightly smaller than the second, and its position varies from over to behind the pelvic fins. The caudal fin is triangular with rounded corners, and is roughly symmetrical above and below. The skin is soft and entirely devoid of dermal denticles.

The dorsal coloration of the ocellated electric ray is extremely variable, with the only constant being the large ocellus ("eyespot") in the middle of the back. The center of the ocellus is black or yellow, which is surrounded by concentric, alternating dark and light rings that may be either continuous or broken. The remainder of the upper surface is most commonly a shade of light brown with numerous fine dark dots; there may also be light dots, larger dark spots or blotches, and/or irregular brown marbling. Some individuals are plain light or dark brown with a black ocellus. The portion of the disc in front of the eyes is brown with up to five darker blotches. The dorsal pattern often extends to the ventral fin margins; the underside is otherwise white to cream-colored. This species grows up to 25 cm (9.8 in) long.

== Distribution and habitat ==
The ocellated electric ray is common in the tropical coastal waters of the eastern Pacific. Its range extends as far north as the Gulf of California and Bahía San Juanico in Baja California Sur, and as far south as Ecuador. A bottom-dwelling species, it has been recorded from the intertidal zone to a depth of 94 m (308 ft). The favored habitat of this ray is sandy bays, though it can also be found over rubble bottoms, rocky terrain, and rhodolith beds.

== Biology and ecology ==
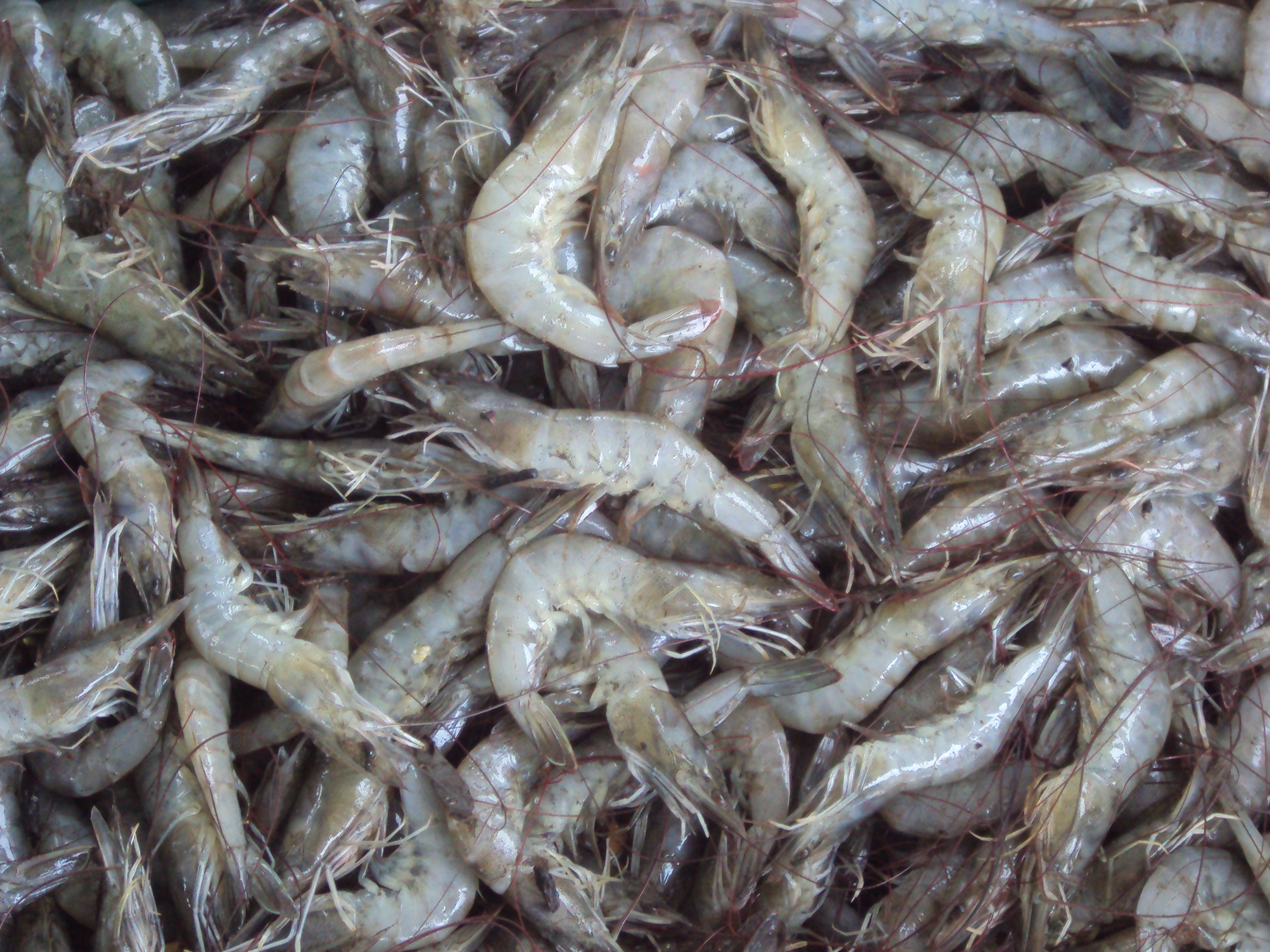
The diet of the ocellated electric ray includes shrimp.

Like the rest of its family, the ocellated electric ray can defend itself by producing a moderate electric shock. During the day, this solitary ray spends most of its time lying partially buried in sand, often near rocky reefs. It becomes more active at night, using its pelvic fins to "hop" along the sea floor. It feeds on small crustaceans such as amphipods and shrimp, as well as polychaete worms. Parasites documented from this species include the tapeworms Acanthobothrium dollyae, A. maryanskii, and A. royi, and the fluke Anaporrhutum euzeti. Though reproductive details are unknown, the ocellated electric ray is presumably viviparous, with the developing embryos sustained first by yolk and later by maternally produced histotroph ("uterine milk"), as in other electric rays. Females mature sexually at under 19 cm (7.5 in) long; the maturation size for males is unknown.

== Human interactions ==
The shock from the ocellated electric ray is not dangerous to humans. It occasionally appears in the home aquarium trade, but is difficult to keep because it requires live invertebrates for food. The ocellated electric ray and other electric rays are used as model organisms in biomedical research because their electric organs are rich in ion channels and acetylcholine receptors, which play important roles in the human nervous system. The protein agrin, which concentrates acetylcholine receptors during human embryonic development, was first isolated from this species. Though the ocellated electric ray is not utilized economically, it is caught incidentally by shrimp trawlers. Its mortality from fishing has not been quantified but is thought to be high, considering that trawling operations in the Atlantic are known to take Diplobatis species in large numbers. The catch rate is also probably underestimated due to problematic identification. Given the restricted range of this species and the intensity of trawling within its habitat, the International Union for Conservation of Nature (IUCN) has assessed it as least concern.
