= Brazilian blind electric ray =

Conservation status
- Vulnerable (IUCN 3.1)

Scientific classification
- Kingdom: Animalia
- Phylum: Chordata
- Class: Chondrichthyes
- Subclass: Elasmobranchii
- Order: Torpediniformes
- Family: Narcinidae
- Genus: Benthobatis
- Species: B. kreffti

Binomial name
- Benthobatis kreffti Rincón, Stehmann & Vooren, 2001

Species of fish

The Brazilian blind electric ray (Benthobatis kreffti), is a species of fish in the family Narcinidae endemic to Brazil. Its natural habitat is open seas.
