= Ornate numbfish =

Conservation status
- Least Concern (IUCN 3.1)

Scientific classification
- Kingdom: Animalia
- Phylum: Chordata
- Class: Chondrichthyes
- Subclass: Elasmobranchii
- Order: Torpediniformes
- Family: Narcinidae
- Genus: Narcinops
- Species: N. ornatus

Binomial name
- Narcinops ornatus (Carvalho, 2008)

Synonyms
- Narcine ornata Carvalho, 2008; Narcinops ornata (Carvalho, 2008)

Species of fish

The ornate numbfish (Narcinops ornatus) is a species of electric ray within the family Narcinidae. It is endemic to northern Australia, inhabiting waters in the Timor and Arafura Seas near Cape Londonderry, The Kimberley, Western Australia, and the western side of Cape York. It is a benthic species, found on continental shelves at depths of 48 to 132 metres (160 to 430 ft) below sea level.

== Biology ==
Female ornate numbfish can grow up to 24.1 centimetres (9.5 in) in length, while males mature at around 17 to 18 centimetres (6.7 to 7.1 in) in length. Females likely reach maturity at the same size. The surface is covered in dark brownish pink spots, with some of these spots joined together creating longitudinal stripes on the middle disc. The underside of the species is white. The diet of the ornate numbfish consists of small invertebrates on the seafloor.

== Conservation ==
The main threat of the ornate numbfish is commercial fishing which can directly or indirectly modify its habitat. The species occurs in a region home to Australia's largest prawn fishery, the Northern Prawn Fishery (NPF), although it has not been reported in bycatch extensively. This is likely due to the species inhabiting depths over 50 metres (160 ft) and not being affected by trawling from the NPF, as well as having a distribution exceeding fishing areas. It has been classified as 'Least concern' by the IUCN Red List, and no specific conservation efforts have been made towards the species.
