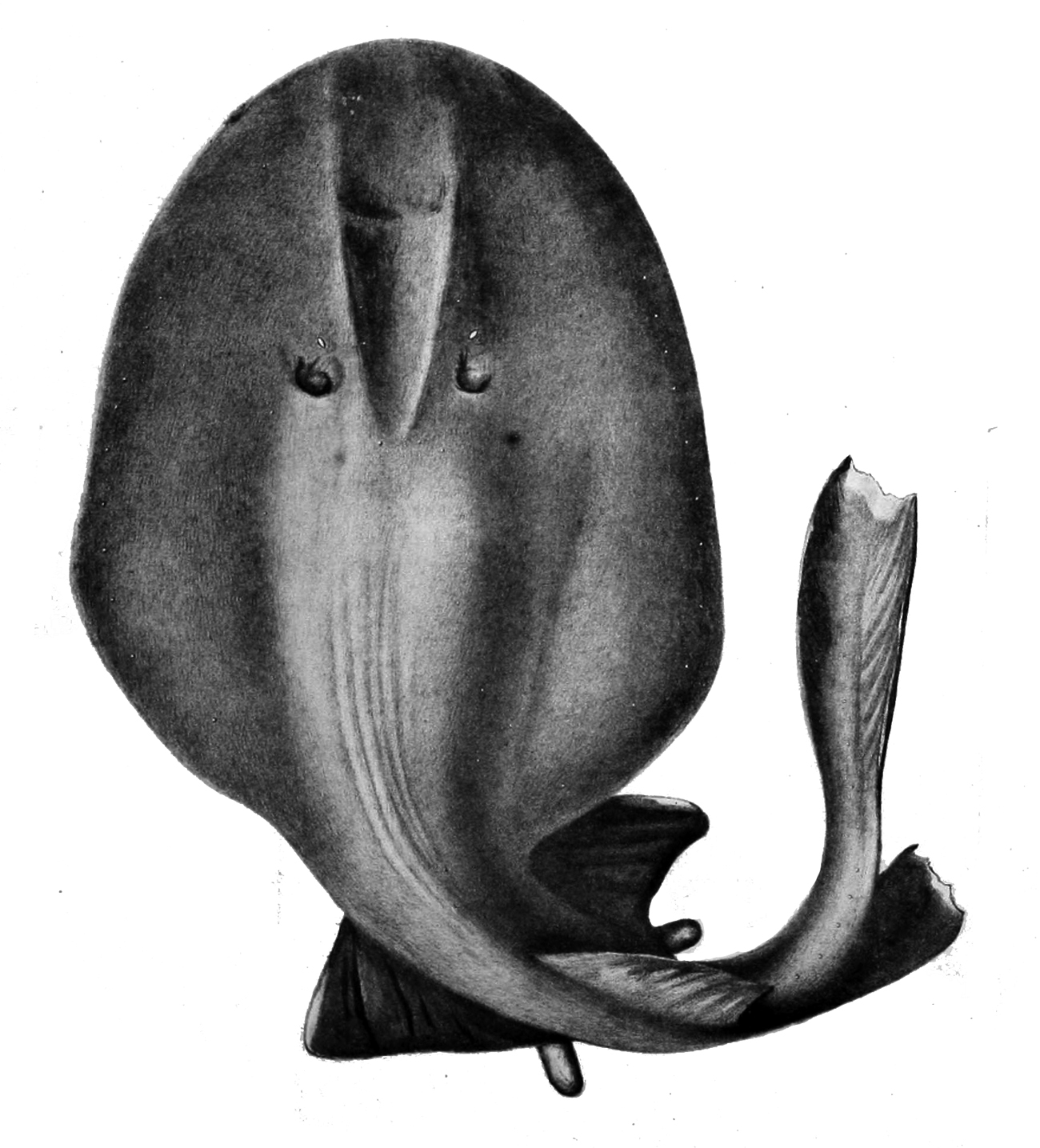

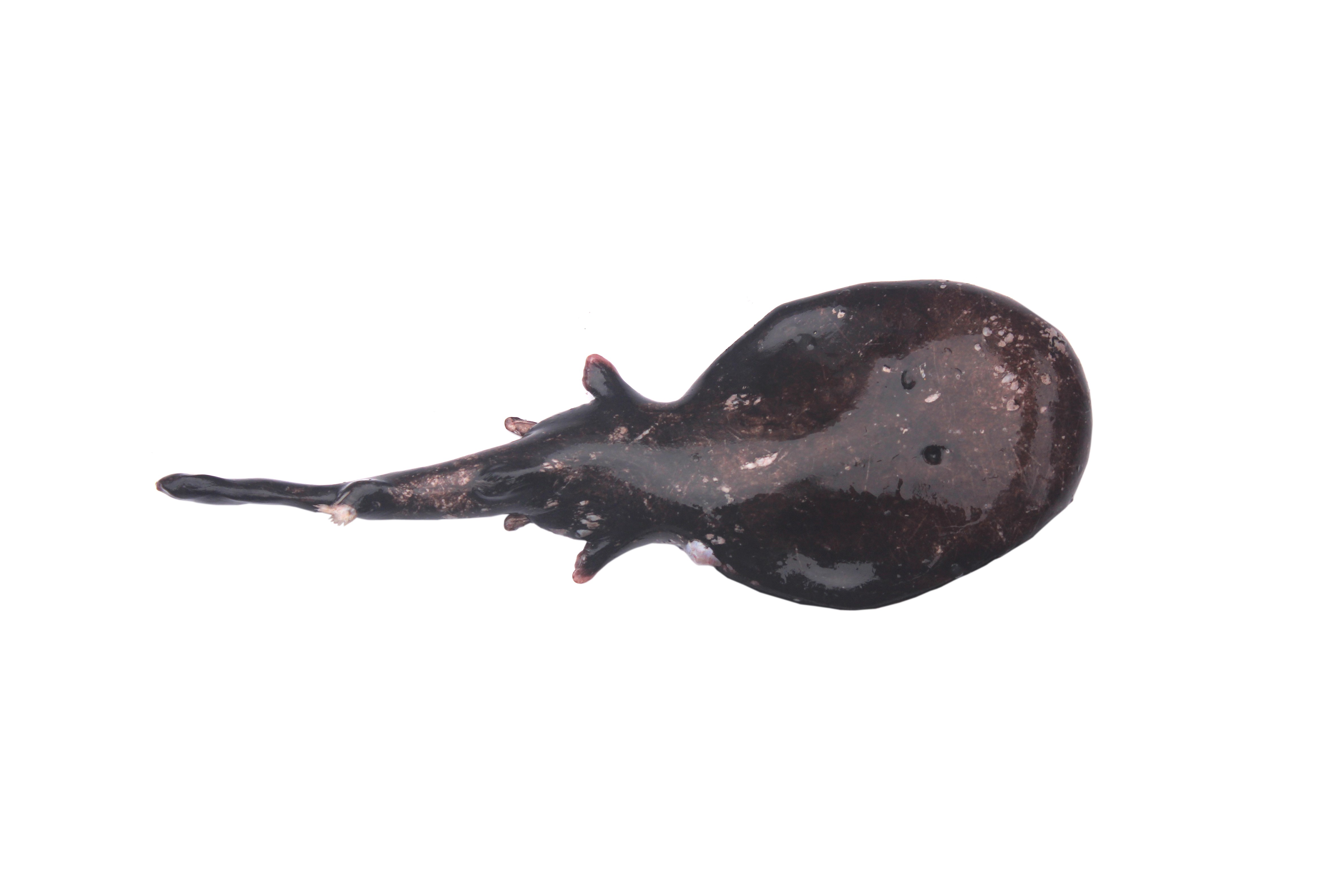

Conservation status
- Least Concern (IUCN 3.1)

Scientific classification
- Kingdom: Animalia
- Phylum: Chordata
- Class: Chondrichthyes
- Subclass: Elasmobranchii
- Order: Torpediniformes
- Family: Narcinidae
- Genus: Benthobatis
- Species: B. moresbyi

Binomial name
- Benthobatis moresbyi Alcock, 1898

= Benthobatis moresbyi =

Species of cartilaginous fish

Benthobatis moresbyi, commonly known as the dark blindray, dark blind ray, or the Indian blind numbfish, is an electric ray species in the family Narcinidae. Robert Moresby was the captain of R.I.M.S. Investigator, the vessel of the Indian Navy for surveying deep water. Thus, the name of this contains his name Benthobatis moresbyi.

== Description ==
B. moresbyi is a relatively small electric ray, with males reaching a maximum size of 35.12 centimeters and females a maximum size of 39.24. Its body is entirely dark brown in color. The caudal fin of the species is very long, almost 1/2 the length of its tail. Its dorsal fins have large bases compared to their height, and are located close together.

== Habitat and distribution ==
B. moresbyi occurs in seas of Yemen, Somalia, and Western India, but likely inhabits other areas as well. It is a bathydemersal species, and lives in depths ranging from 787 - 1071 meters. Little is known about its population or threats, but it may be caught by fisheries as a bycatch. It does not have any conservation actions currently taking place for it, and is listed as Least Concern by IUCN.
