= Painted electric ray =

Conservation status
- Vulnerable (IUCN 3.1)

Scientific classification
- Kingdom: Animalia
- Phylum: Chordata
- Class: Chondrichthyes
- Subclass: Elasmobranchii
- Order: Torpediniformes
- Family: Narcinidae
- Genus: Diplobatis
- Species: D. picta

Binomial name
- Diplobatis picta G. Palmer, 1950
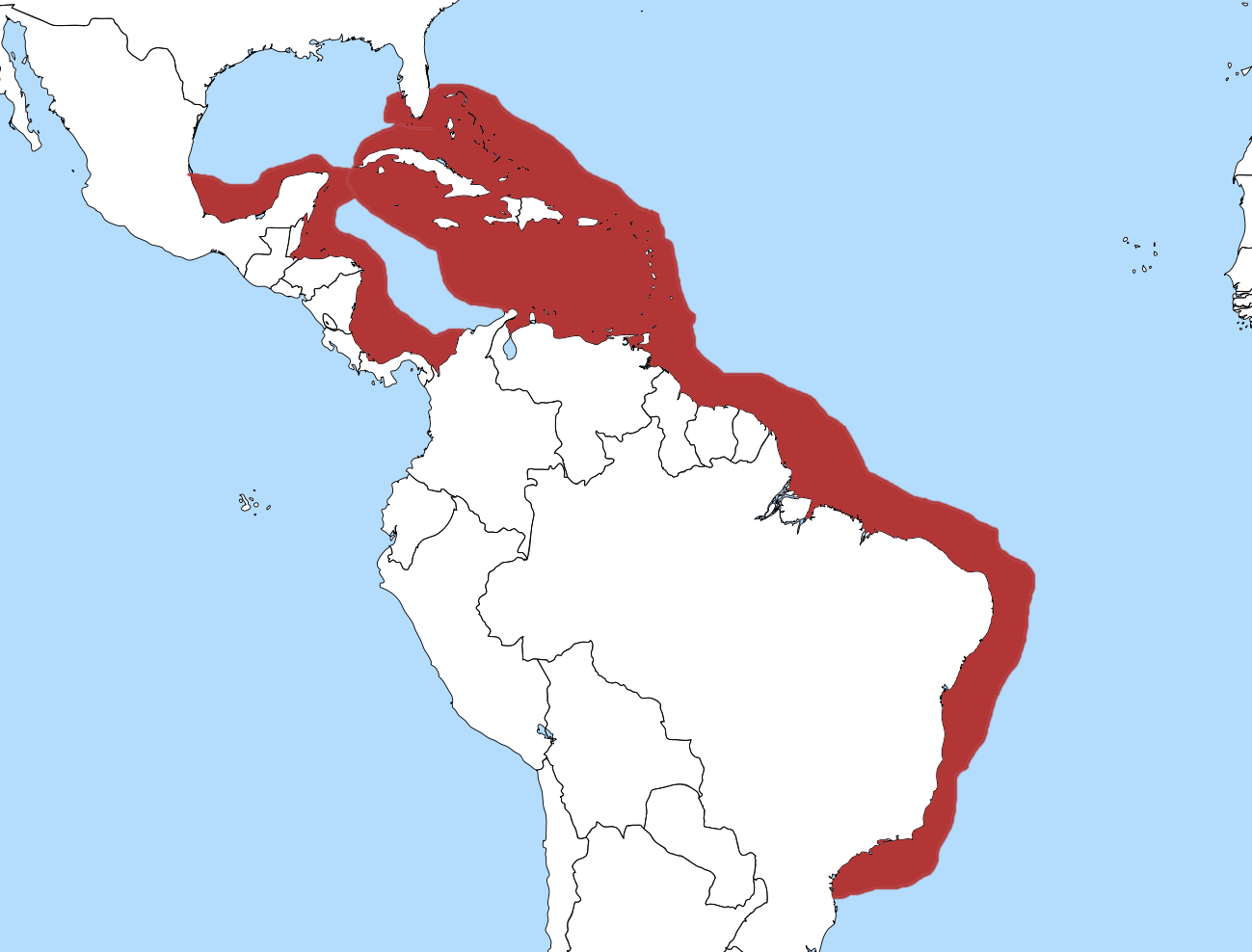
- Range of the painted electric ray

Synonyms
- Diplobatis altenai Boeseman, 1963

Species of cartilaginous fish

The painted electric ray or variegated electric ray (Diplobatis picta, sometimes misspelled pictus) is a poorly known species of numbfish, family Narcinidae, native to the western Atlantic Ocean from southeastern Venezuela to the mouth of the Amazon River in Brazil. It is common on soft substrates at a depth of 2–120 metres (10–390 ft).
