= Colombian electric ray =

Conservation status
- Vulnerable (IUCN 3.1)

Scientific classification
- Kingdom: Animalia
- Phylum: Chordata
- Class: Chondrichthyes
- Subclass: Elasmobranchii
- Order: Torpediniformes
- Family: Narcinidae
- Genus: Diplobatis
- Species: D. colombiensis

Binomial name
- Diplobatis colombiensis Fechhelm & McEachran, 1984

Species of fish

The Colombian electric ray (Diplobatis colombiensis) is a species of fish in the family Narcinidae endemic to Colombia. Its natural habitat is open seas.
