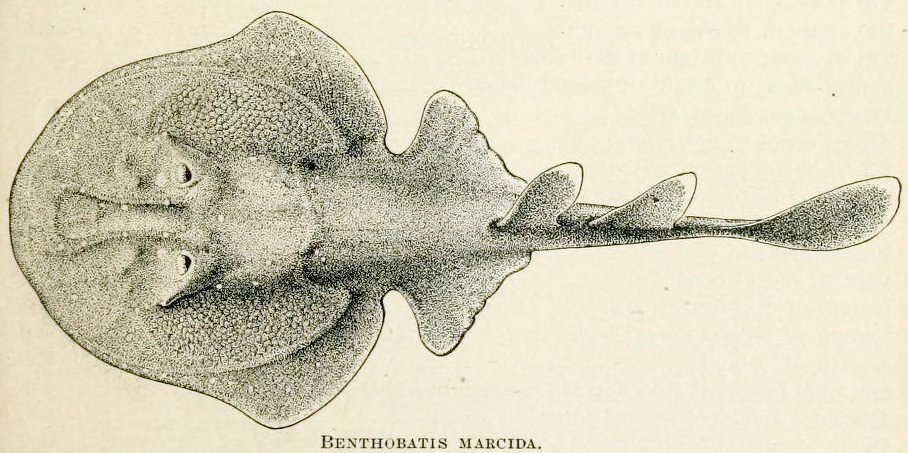

Conservation status
- Least Concern (IUCN 3.1)

Scientific classification
- Kingdom: Animalia
- Phylum: Chordata
- Class: Chondrichthyes
- Subclass: Elasmobranchii
- Order: Torpediniformes
- Family: Narcinidae
- Genus: Benthobatis
- Species: B. marcida

Binomial name
- Benthobatis marcida B. A. Bean & A. C. Weed, 1909

= Benthobatis marcida =

Species of cartilaginous fish

Benthobatis marcida, the blind torpedo, is a species of electric ray most commonly found in the west–central area of the Atlantic Ocean. Like all electric rays, it can produce an electric shock that can be harmful to humans and other fish. It can grow up to 50 cm (20 in) long.
