= Benthobatis yangi =

Taiwanese blind electric ray

Conservation status
- Vulnerable (IUCN 3.1)

Scientific classification
- Kingdom: Animalia
- Phylum: Chordata
- Class: Chondrichthyes
- Subclass: Elasmobranchii
- Order: Torpediniformes
- Family: Narcinidae
- Genus: Benthobatis
- Species: B. yangi

Binomial name
- Benthobatis yangi Carvalho, Compagno & Ebert, 2003

Species of fish

Benthobatis yangi, the Taiwanese blind electric ray, is a species of fish in the family Narcinidae endemic to marine ecosystems near Taiwan. Its natural habitat is on the upper continental slopes of coastal waters.

== Description ==
Relatively few specimens of this species are known so far. Mature individuals reach a length of 19.1 - 21.5 cm. Both dorsal and ventral surfaces are dark brown to purplish-black, with irregular whitish blotches on the belly. Gill slits are very narrow; the second dorsal fin is slightly larger than first.

== Distribution and habitat ==
B. yangi appears to have a very limited distribution on continental shelves at a depth of less than 300 m, on the coast of southwestern Taiwan (especially off Tungkang).

== Feeding habits ==
Like all species of electric rays, B. yangi uses its electric shocks to paralyze prey. Remains of polychaete worms are found in some specimens, meaning that these animals may be a preferred prey of B. yangi.

== Conservation ==
B. yangi is not a target of fisheries but appears to be taken (and discarded) as bycatch in the shrimp fishing industry. Shrimp fishing in the region makes use of very fine nets that likely prevent this species from avoiding capture. Based on the very limited distribution and possible high rate of bycatch mortality, the IUCN has classified the species as Vulnerable in its red list of threatened species.
