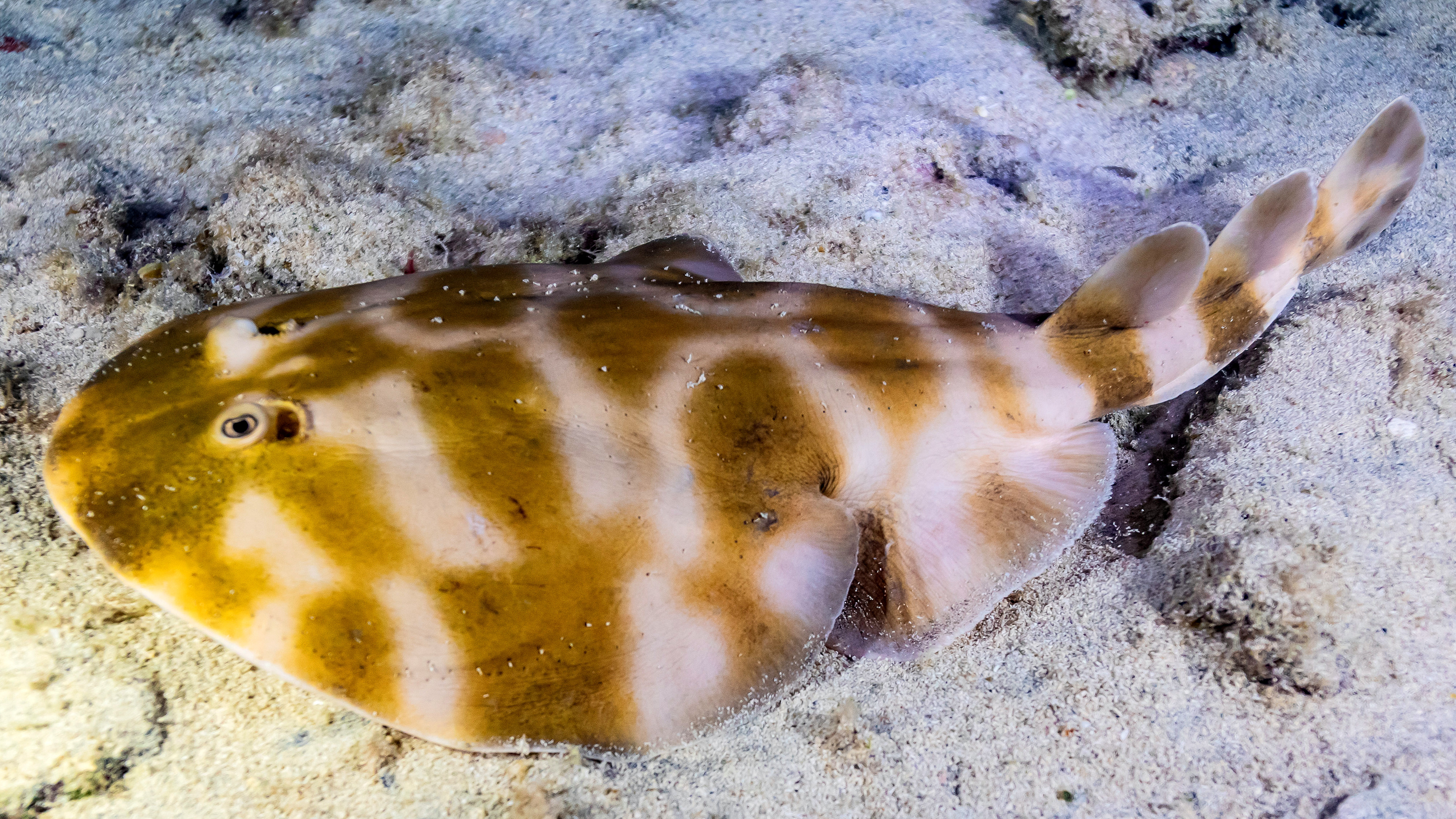

Conservation status
- Near Threatened (IUCN 3.1)

Scientific classification
- Kingdom: Animalia
- Phylum: Chordata
- Class: Chondrichthyes
- Subclass: Elasmobranchii
- Order: Torpediniformes
- Family: Narcinidae
- Genus: Narcine
- Species: N. brasiliensis

Binomial name
- Narcine brasiliensis (Olfers, 1831)

Synonyms
- Narcine brachypleura (Miranda-Ribeiro, 1923); Torpedo brasiliensis Olfers, 1831; Torpedo ocellata Quoy & Gaimard, 1824

= Narcine brasiliensis =

Species of cartilaginous fish

Narcine brasiliensis, the Brazilian electric ray, sometimes called the lesser numbfish, is a species of electric ray in the family Narcinidae. It is found mostly in the coastal waters of the southwest Atlantic from Brazil to northern Argentina, though smaller populations are found throughout the Caribbean and the South-Eastern American Coast.

== Habitat ==
The Brazilian electric ray is a warm water species and inhabits waters that are about 1 to 45m deep, mostly at 10 to 20 meters deep in the summer and autumn. They are common around sandy shorelines and sometimes coral reefs. When there is a temperature gradient between an inshore and an offshore they will habituate at the depths with the highest temperature. The density of this species had a higher concentration in temperatures that were greater than 20 °C (68 °F). They prefer shallow waters because that is usually the warmest part of the water. During the summer, they are abundant in coastal water with depths that go to 20 m (66 ft) and in the winter, they are still in that area but in a lower concentration and at deeper depths, about 40 to 50 m (130 to 160 ft), to avoid the cold temperatures. This behavior points toward a migration towards the south in the summer because of the warmer water with higher salinity. The salinity range that they prefer is from 24% to 36%. They hunt and hide around areas with soft sand and/or mud substrate.

=== Geographic range ===
The Brazilian electric ray is generally found in the Western Hemisphere, around the southern coast of North America and the eastern and northern coasts of South America. They are considered an endemic species of the western Atlantic Ocean. There have been a few locations along the coast of Brazil where they have been reported, including Rio Grande do Sul, Paraná, Cananéia, Ubatuba, Bahia, Pernambuco, Paraíba, Maranhão, Pará, and Amapá. On the east coast of the United States they are found in the waters along the coasts of Florida, Georgia, South Carolina, and North Carolina. On the south coast of the United States they are located on the southern coasts of Florida, Alabama and Mississippi. In the Caribbean, they have been documented around the Lesser Antilles and the Yucatan Peninsula in Mexico.

== Description ==
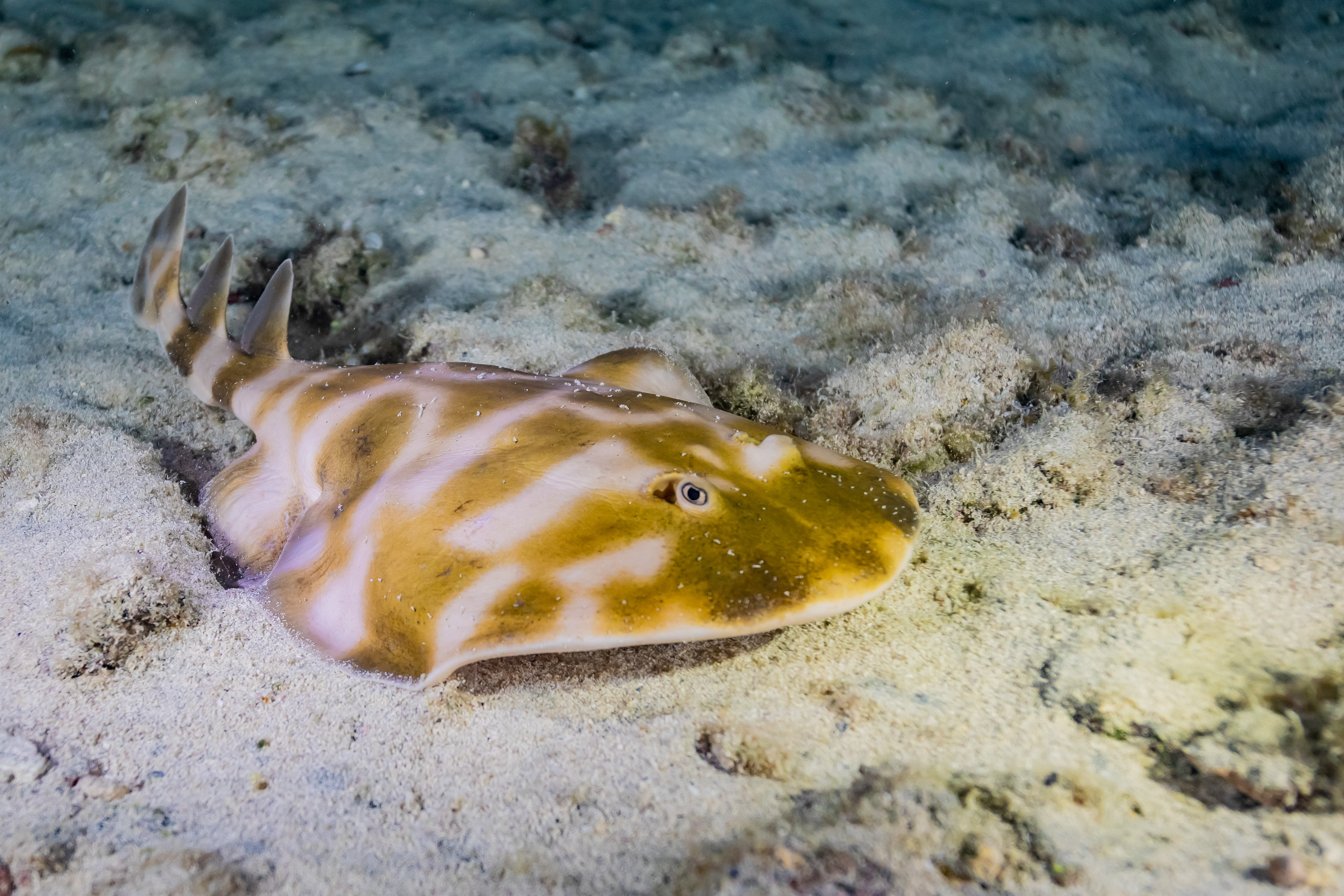
Brazilian electric ray in Abrolhos Marine National Park

They are small to moderate sized, reaching no more than about 45 cm (1.48 ft) in total length, with an oval shaped body and two dorsal fins that are around the same size. The caudal fin is shaped like a triangle and there is no spine on the caudal fin on this ray, unlike some other species. On the dorsal side of their body they have brown coloration, and white coloration on their ventral side. They have an elongated body, and they are not very short or rounded, which helps to differentiate them from other ray species. The jaw arch, which consists of the lower and upper jaw, moves as a unit. This allows them to create suction in order to feed and capture prey hiding in the sand or mud substrate. The limitation to this is that because there are a series of ligaments that constrict the jaws from moving in other directions, it may cause limits in their diet, but at the same time increase their suction ability.

They have an electroreceptor system located on the ventral part of their body that is sensitive to low frequency, which they use to search for prey. The system is composed of many sensory units known as Ampullae of Lorenzini, these are connected to the environment and the nervous system through external pores and canals by nerves and fibers. These rays also have electric organs that can generate an average voltage about 0.35 - 0.37 mV, usually between 14 and 37 volts. The organs are located in their pectoral fins and are noticeable on the ray when viewed from the front. The lobules have hexagonal faces and they show their shape through the skin. The size and number of the cells in the electric organs are higher in adults than in embryos/newborns, which causes the newborns to generate weaker electric organ discharge. This makes them more vulnerable to predators.

Not much is known about their life cycle, but what is known is that they have a very long surviving capacity and a low natural mortality rate from predation.

=== Sexual dimorphism ===
While the females reach a larger overall size than males, features such as the eyes, mouth, and nostrils are larger in males. The tails on males are longer than females' tails because the posterior region of the body develops at a faster rate than the total length. The larger size of females helps with the nourishment of the embryos. The males also have higher values of the proportions of the dorsal fins, and the superior lobe of their caudal fin. The females have a wider trunk (main part of the body), this is because they have to accommodate all of the embryos that they hold. Males have a greater proportion of their electric organs than females, which may be another example of resource allocation in this species since the females have to use more energy to produce nutrients for the embryos.

=== Development ===
Although little is known about this species' life cycle, scientists do know that they have slow growth and birth is viviparous. Since they are born live, as they are developing inside the womb, each individual ray (or pup) has a yolk-sac which they use for obtaining nutrients as they are growing in the womb. As they grow bigger and get closer to being birthed by the mother, those nutrients are used up. The three main stages of life for this ray are neonate (newborn), juvenile, and adult. Neonates do not have a lot of electric cells so they cannot give off as much of a voltage as juveniles and adults.

=== Reproduction ===
Sexual maturity occurs when males have a total length of about 25 cm (9.8 in) and when females have a total length of about 30 cm (12 in). Although there is low fecundity, generally, in females, they can produce about 4-15 embryos per pregnancy. As females increase in size, their fecundity increases as well, meaning there is a selective advantage for larger sized female rays. Since males are generally smaller in size than females, they also reach sexual maturity at smaller sizes compared to females. Most pregnancy in females occurs in the summer and the autumn, and pre-ovulatory periods in females occur in the winter. In males, calcifying claspers were observed during the summer, autumn, and winter. Going along with this pattern in males in females, there is an annual reproductive cycle with a mating season during the spring and a pregnancy and birth season during the summer and the autumn. There is a high energy requirement during the courtship and mating process, and there may be bite marks observed in sexually mature female and male dorsal regions during the mating period.

=== Behavior ===
This species of ray migrates around November and December from the north to areas with a depth of about 20 m (66 ft), and then migrates again during May and June to areas with a depth of about 10 m (33 ft). This migration is mainly driven by reproductive opportunities or feeding opportunities. The migration has also been associated with the higher temperatures in the south during the winter months, as they have been observed having a sluggish and slow-moving sort of behavior if they are in water that is less than 20 °C (68 °F). They spend most of the time buried in the substrate or in murky water because of their demersal habits, in order to hide from predators and search for prey. Unlike some other electric ray species, this species of electric ray generally only uses its electric organs for predator defense and intraspecific communication. Neonates, since they are smaller in size, have smaller electric organs, so when they are defending themselves against predators, they discharge a greater number of electric organ discharges than juveniles and adults in order to make up for their size.

== Ecosystem role ==
The Brazilian electric ray is considered a macropredator in its habitat and it plays an important role in the ecosystem dynamics. One such role they play is population control, keeping the number of polychaetes and crustaceans down which in turn helps the population of algae. Since these rays help the population numbers of algae, they are also known to help in connecting the lower and the higher trophic levels. Because they play such important roles, changes in their populations may lead to negative changes in the ecosystem at all the tropic levels.

=== Food habits ===
Since the Brazilian electric ray is a benthic feeder, they mainly feed on invertebrates that are buried in the sand. For example, polychaetas are one of the main parte of its diet. Other animals that this species has been known for feeding on are crustaceans, marine worms, poriferans (sponges), echinoderms (starfish), and some other types of benthonic fish. When they do catch prey, they use benthonic pressure suction in order to take the prey into their mouth and swallow it whole. In order to create that suction to get their prey, they extend their jaws into the substrate, then they retract their jaws very quickly and create "super ambient orobranchial pressure" to get rid of any sediment taken in and draw food towards the esophagus. Since they have a lot of muscle control in their mouths, these rays are able to remove the exoskeletons of crustaceans, squid mantels, and bivalve shells in order to eat only the indigestible parts.

== Relationship to humans ==
The Brazilian electric ray faces the highest mortality from anthropogenic effects. One of the main effects is the fishing industry, as it has been responsible for the decline of several populations of this species over the past 30 years. They are usually discarded as bycatch when they are caught accidentally by trawl nets. Even though the fishermen may throw the rays back into the water alive, they have been observed to sustain injuries from this. Some of those injuries observed are contusion in the bottom portion of their body (the most common injury), many deep cuts, fractures, and partial or even total loss of body parts.

In the economy, they have no commercial value, and are usually only caught by accident. Their release as by-catch from trawl nets is considered an annoyance and a challenge by fishermen because of the electric discharges that the rays give off as they are being handled.

=== Conservation status ===
Since Brazilian electric rays do not have any commercial importance, there are not many statistics on the commercial fisheries of this species and no statistics on efforts that would enable a population status assessment. The IUCN Red List of Threatened Species put this species in the Near Threatened category. More research is needed to determine the taxonomic issues, population dynamics, morphology, and distribution. However, most of them are killed by the fishing industry and since this industry is so huge it is likely that they may be threatened, since the depth that they exist and proliferate in is the same depth that is interrupted by shrimp trawls.
