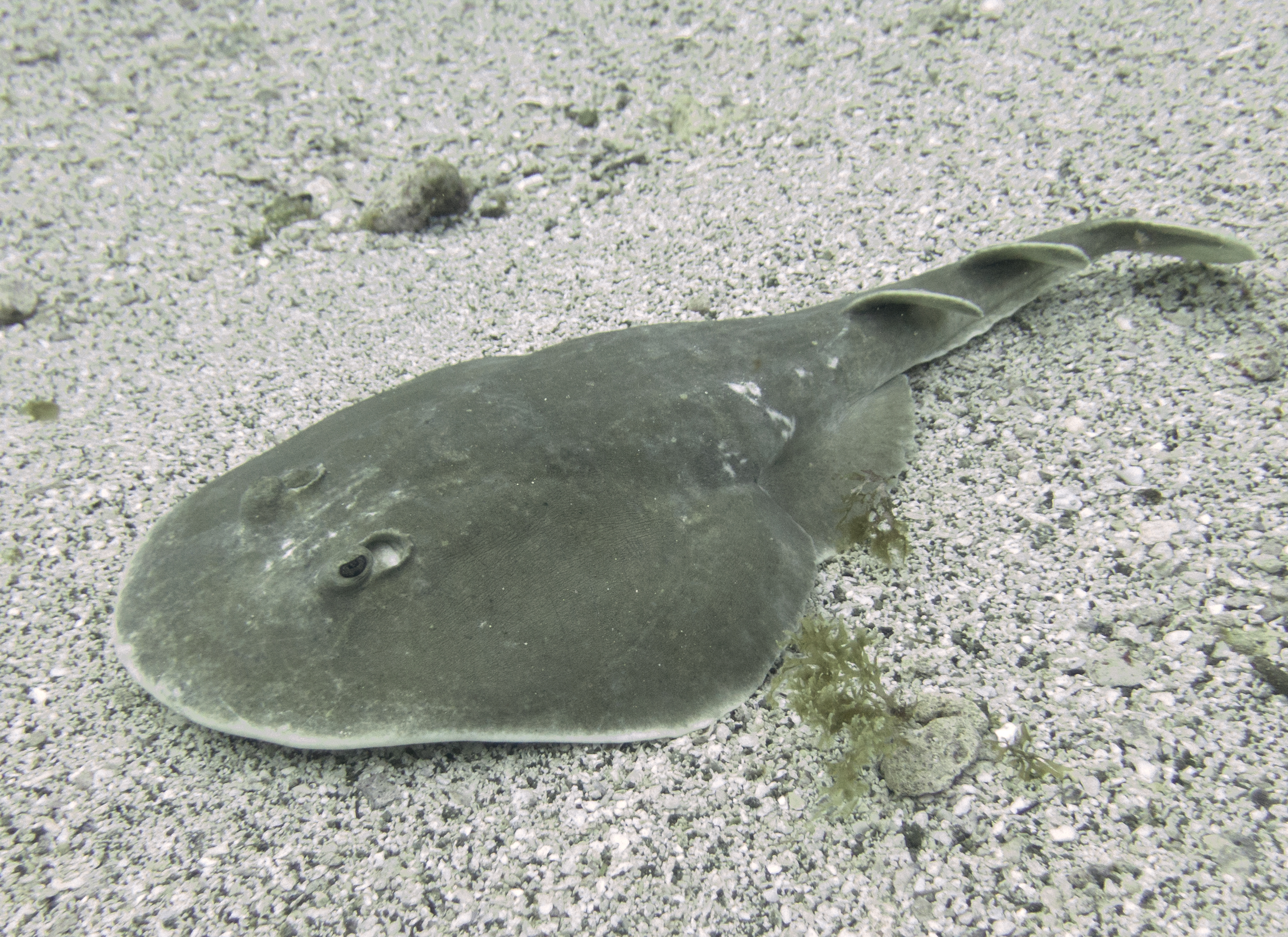

Conservation status
- Vulnerable (IUCN 3.1)

Scientific classification
- Kingdom: Animalia
- Phylum: Chordata
- Class: Chondrichthyes
- Subclass: Elasmobranchii
- Order: Torpediniformes
- Family: Narcinidae
- Genus: Narcine
- Species: N. entemedor

Binomial name
- Narcine entemedor D. S. Jordan & Starks, 1895

= Narcine entemedor =

Giant electric ray

Species of cartilaginous fish

Narcine entemedor, the giant electric ray or Cortez electric ray, is a species of numbfish, family Narcinidae, native to the eastern Pacific Ocean from the Gulf of California to Panama. It is found in shallow water on sandy bottoms and sometimes adjacent to reefs. This species is closely related to the lesser electric ray (Narcine bancroftii) from the western Atlantic, and may represent the same species. The specific epithet entemedor seems to be the Spanish equivalent of "intimidator".

This species attains a maximum length of 76 cm (30 in). The flattened pectoral fin disk is round, as long as it is wide, and overlapping the origin of the large pelvic fins. The eyes are much smaller than the spiracles, which are edged with small tubercles. The nostril on each side is not divided into two separate apertures. The teeth are mostly exposed when the mouth is closed. The tail is equal in length to the disk, with loose lateral folds of skin and two dorsal fins of equal size. The tips of the dorsal and caudal fins are angular. The skin is soft and loose, without denticles or thorns. The coloration is generally grayish tan to brown above; some individuals have several pairs of faint ocelli. The dorsal and caudal fins often darken towards the tips but have fine white margins. There is a record of a partially albino adult female, measuring 69 cm (27 in) long.

Like other numbfishes, the giant electric ray can deliver a painful electric shock. This species is nocturnal and spends the day half-buried under sand. At night, it moves into shallow bays to feed, mostly on polychaete worms but perhaps also on sea squirts. It moves along the bottom by "hopping" on its flexible ribbed pelvic fins. If threatened by a predator, it exhibits a characteristic defense behavior in which it erupts from the bottom, arches its back, and performs a "somersault" in the water column. In one case, a diver was shocked when the ray landed on his back after such a maneuver. Reproduction is ovoviviparous, in which the developing embryos are nourished by uterine "milk" produced by the mother. The females give birth to 4-15 young, measuring 11–12 cm (4.3-4.7 in) long. The reproductive cycle is annual, with ovulation and fertilization taking place in July and August. Males may exceed 11 years of age, and females 15 years.

Known parasites of the giant electric ray include the tapeworms Acanthobothrium franus and A. inbiorium, and the copepod Taeniacanthodes dojirii. According to PhD J. Fernando Marquez-Farias, this species is harvested by an artisanal ray fishery in the Gulf of California, specifically in the coastal waters of the Mexican states of Sinaloa, Baja California, Baja California Sur and Sonora, being in this last one part of a multispecies fishery.
