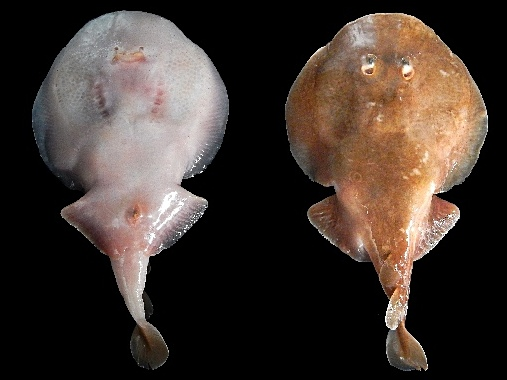

Conservation status
- Least Concern (IUCN 3.1)

Scientific classification
- Domain: Eukaryota
- Kingdom: Animalia
- Phylum: Chordata
- Class: Chondrichthyes
- Subclass: Elasmobranchii
- Order: Torpediniformes
- Family: Narcinidae
- Genus: Narcine
- Species: N. brunnea

Binomial name
- Narcine brunnea Annandale, 1909

= Narcine brunnea =

Species of cartilaginous fish

Narcine brunnea, the brown numbfish or brown electric ray, is a species of numbfish in the family Narcinidae. It is found in Indo-West Pacific countries such as Pakistan off coast, India, Sri Lanka, to the Gulf of Thailand. They mainly live in continental waters, both inshore and offshore. The maximum length is about 22 cm (8.7 in).
