= Brownband numbfish =

Conservation status
- Vulnerable (IUCN 3.1)

Scientific classification
- Kingdom: Animalia
- Phylum: Chordata
- Class: Chondrichthyes
- Subclass: Elasmobranchii
- Order: Torpediniformes
- Family: Narcinidae
- Genus: Diplobatis
- Species: D. guamachensis

Binomial name
- Diplobatis guamachensis Martín Salazar, 1957

Species of fish

The brownband numbfish (Diplobatis guamachensis) is a species of fish in the family Narcinidae found in eastern Colombia, Venezuela and Trinidad and Tobago. Its natural habitat is open seas.
