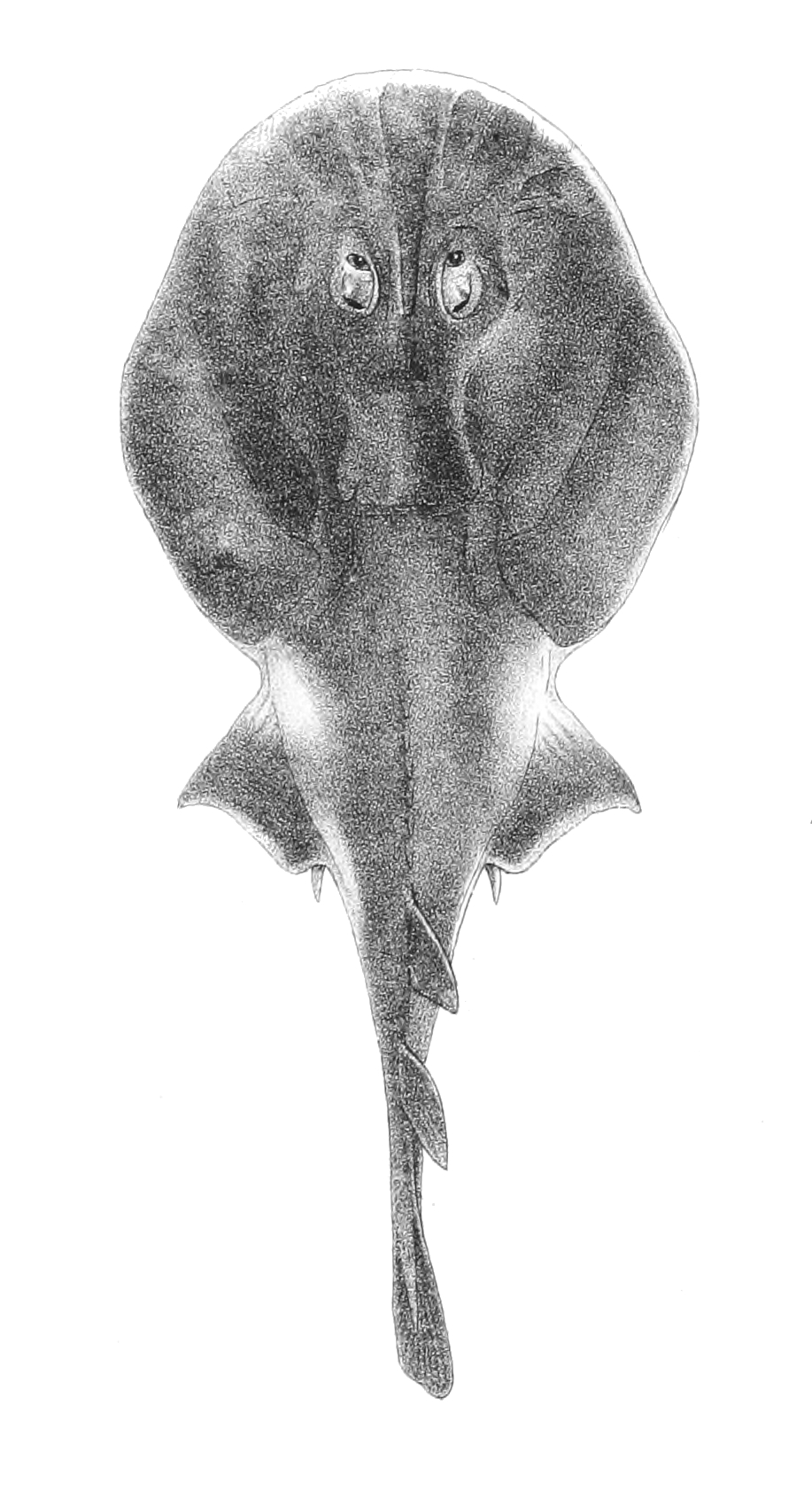

Conservation status
- Vulnerable (IUCN 3.1)

Scientific classification
- Kingdom: Animalia
- Phylum: Chordata
- Class: Chondrichthyes
- Subclass: Elasmobranchii
- Order: Torpediniformes
- Family: Narcinidae
- Genus: Narcine
- Species: N. timlei

Binomial name
- Narcine timlei (Bloch & Schneider, 1801)

Synonyms
- Raja timlei Narcine microphthalma Narcine maculata Narcine macrura Narcine indica Henle, 1834

= Narcine timlei =

Blackspotted numbfish

Species of cartilaginous fish

Narcine timlei, the blackspotted numbfish, black-spotted electric ray, Indian electric ray, largespotted numbfish or spotted numbfish, is a species of numbfish in the family Narcinidae.

== Description ==
Narcine timlei grows to a maximum length of 38 cm. Antimicrobial compounds can be found in Narcine timlei. The epitopes of N.timlei have remained remarkably conserved throughout evolution.

== Distribution ==
This species is found in coastal regions and also offshore in the Indo-West Pacific, from Pakistan to the Philippines. Narcine timlei is found in inshore marine waters and can withstand salinity up to 35 parts per thousand.

== Parasites ==
Narcine timlei is host to a number of parasites including:

- Charopinus narcinae Pillai, 1962
- Caudacanthus narcini (Pillai, 1963)
- Pseudocharopinus narcinae (Pillai, 1962)
- Taeniacanthus narcini Pillai, 1963
