= Narcinops =

Scientific classification
- Kingdom: Animalia
- Phylum: Chordata
- Class: Chondrichthyes
- Subclass: Elasmobranchii
- Order: Torpediniformes
- Family: Narcinidae
- Genus: Narcinops; Whitley, 1940

Genus of electric rays

Narcinops is a genus of electric rays within the family Narcinidae.

== Species ==
- Narcinops lasti (Carvalho & Séret, 2002)
- Narcinops nelsoni (Carvalho, 2008)
- Narcinops ornatus (Carvalho, 2008)
- Narcinops tasmaniensis (Richardson, 1841)
- Narcinops westraliensis (McKay, 1966)
