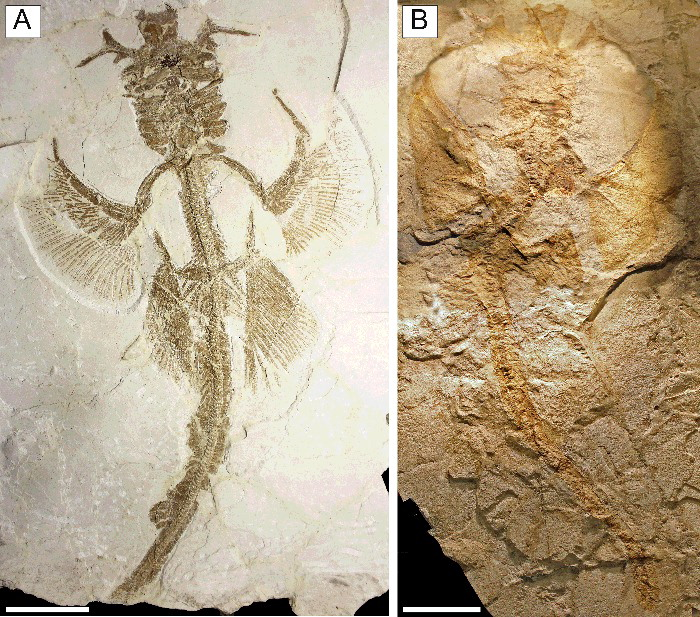
- Titanonarke molini from the Eocene of Italy

Scientific classification
- Domain: Eukaryota
- Kingdom: Animalia
- Phylum: Chordata
- Class: Chondrichthyes
- Subclass: Elasmobranchii
- Order: Torpediniformes
- Family: Narcinidae
- Genus: †Titanonarke; Carvalho, 2010

= Titanonarke =

Titanonarke Temporal range: Eocene

Extinct genus of electric ray

Titanonarke is an extinct genus of large electric rays known from the Ypresian age of the Eocene epoch. It currently contains two species from the Bolca Lagerstatte of Italy, T. molini and T. megapterygia. The exceptional preservation of multiple entire individuals has allowed a detailed reconstruction of their lives. Specimens of both species have been found with various ontogenetic stages and with parasitic isopods preserved. One specimen contains a fossilized embryo, showing this species to be viviparous. This species seems to prefer shallow water habitats associated with coral reefs, not unlike modern relatives. Stomach contents reveal a diet which included an extinct large benthic foraminifera genus, Alveolina.
