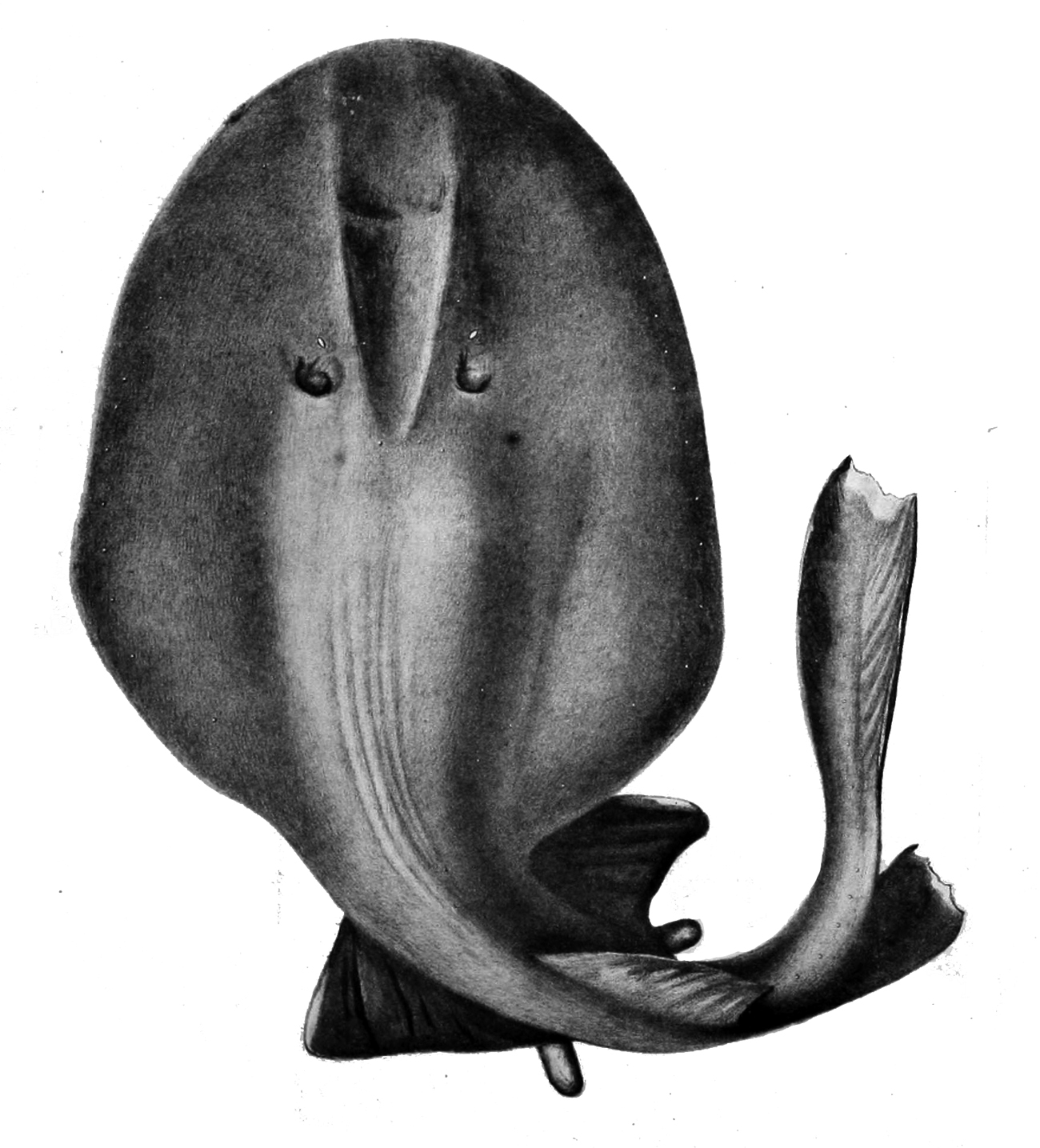
- Dark Blind Ray (B. moresbyi)

Scientific classification
- Kingdom: Animalia
- Phylum: Chordata
- Class: Chondrichthyes
- Subclass: Elasmobranchii
- Order: Torpediniformes
- Family: Narcinidae
- Genus: Benthobatis; Alcock, 1898

= Benthobatis =

Benthobatis Temporal range: Middle Miocene–present

Genus of cartilaginous fishes

Benthobatis is a genus of fish in the family Narcinidae with four currently recognized species.

The only known fossil teeth of this genus are from the Middle Miocene of Japan.

== Species ==
- Benthobatis kreffti Rincón, Stehmann & Vooren, 2001 (Brazilian blind electric ray)
- Benthobatis marcida B. A. Bean & A. C. Weed, 1909 (Blind torpedo)
- Benthobatis moresbyi Alcock, 1898 (Dark blind ray)
- Benthobatis yangi M. R. de Carvalho, Compagno & Ebert, 2003 (Taiwanese blind electric ray)
