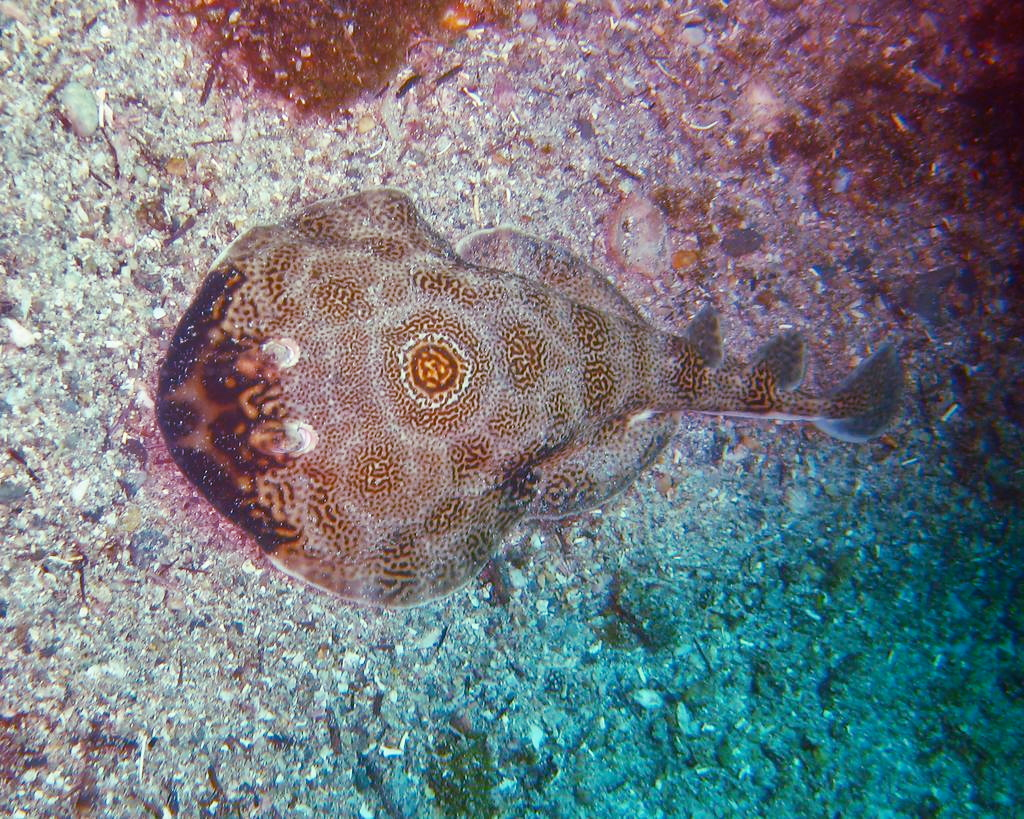
- Ocellated electric ray (D. ommata)

Scientific classification
- Kingdom: Animalia
- Phylum: Chordata
- Class: Chondrichthyes
- Subclass: Elasmobranchii
- Order: Torpediniformes
- Family: Narcinidae
- Genus: Diplobatis; Bigelow & Schroeder, 1948

Type species
- Discopyge ommata Jordan & Gilbert, 1890

= Diplobatis =

Genus of cartilaginous fishes

Diplobatis is a genus of electric rays in the family Narcinidae.

== Species ==
- Diplobatis colombiensis Fechhelm & McEachran, 1984 (Colombian electric ray)
- Diplobatis guamachensis Martín Salazar, 1957 (Brownband numbfish)
- Diplobatis ommata (D. S. Jordan & C. H. Gilbert, 1890) (Ocellated electric ray)
- Diplobatis picta G. Palmer, 1950 (Painted electric ray)
