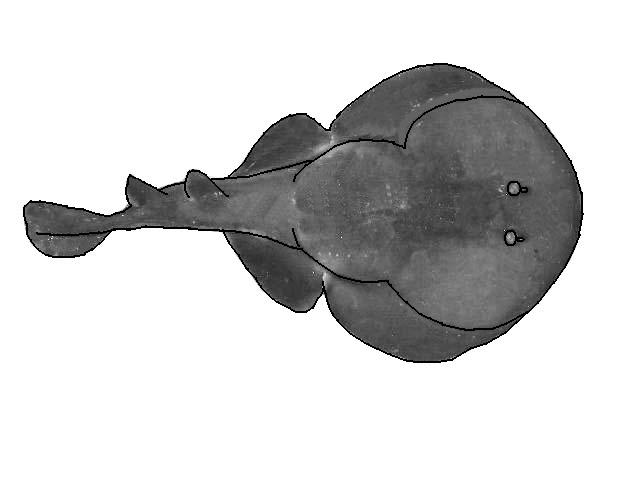
- Discopyge tschudii

Scientific classification
- Kingdom: Animalia
- Phylum: Chordata
- Class: Chondrichthyes
- Subclass: Elasmobranchii
- Order: Torpediniformes
- Family: Narcinidae
- Genus: Discopyge; Heckel, 1846

= Discopyge =

Genus of cartilaginous fishes

Discopyge is a small genus of fish, the apron rays, in the family Narcinidae.

== Species ==
- Discopyge castelloi Menni, Rincón & M. L. Garcia, 2008
- Discopyge tschudii Heckel, 1846 (Apron ray)
