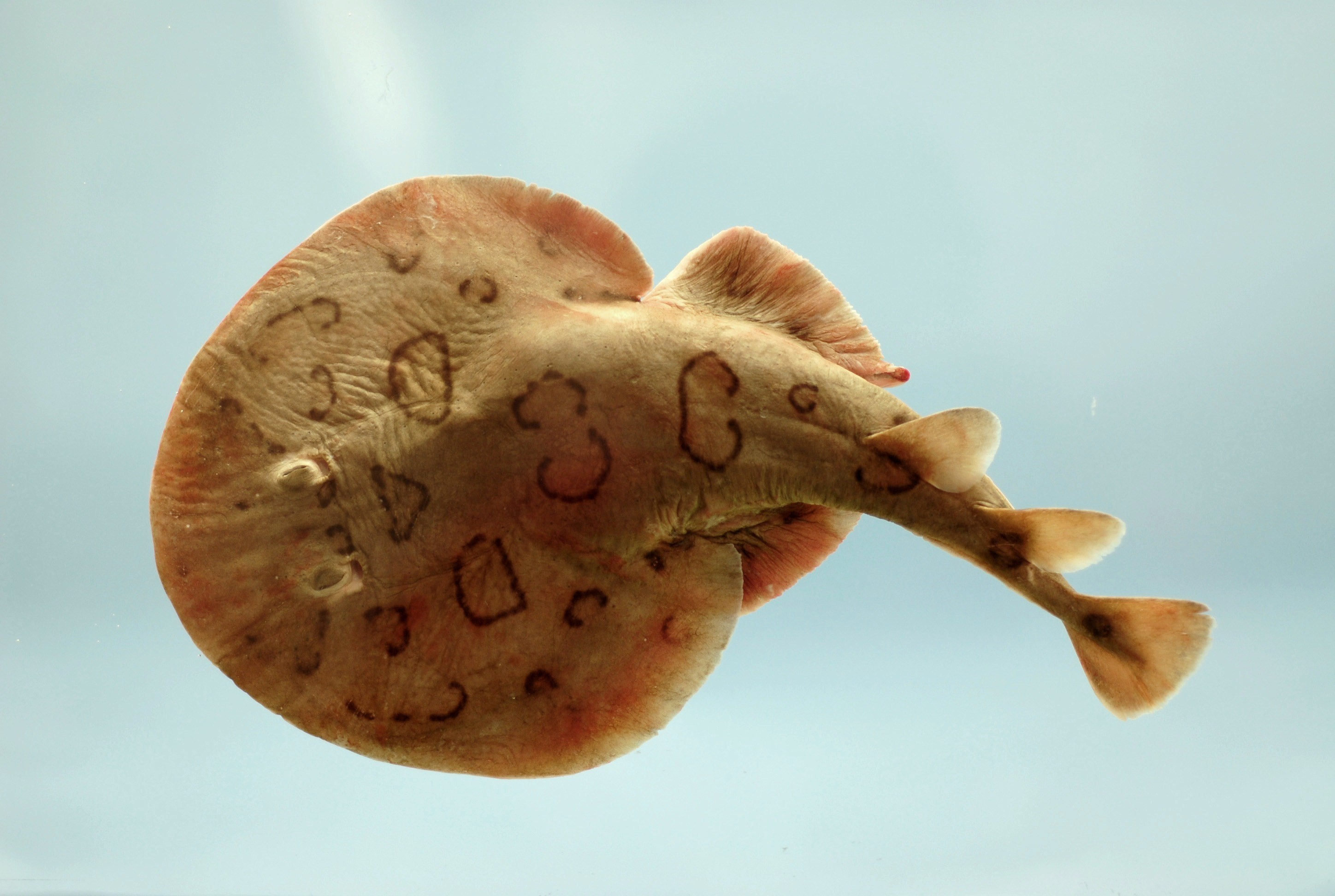

Conservation status
- Least Concern (IUCN 3.1)

Scientific classification
- Kingdom: Animalia
- Phylum: Chordata
- Class: Chondrichthyes
- Subclass: Elasmobranchii
- Order: Torpediniformes
- Family: Narcinidae
- Genus: Narcine
- Species: N. bancroftii

Binomial name
- Narcine bancroftii (E. Griffith & C. H. Smith, 1834)
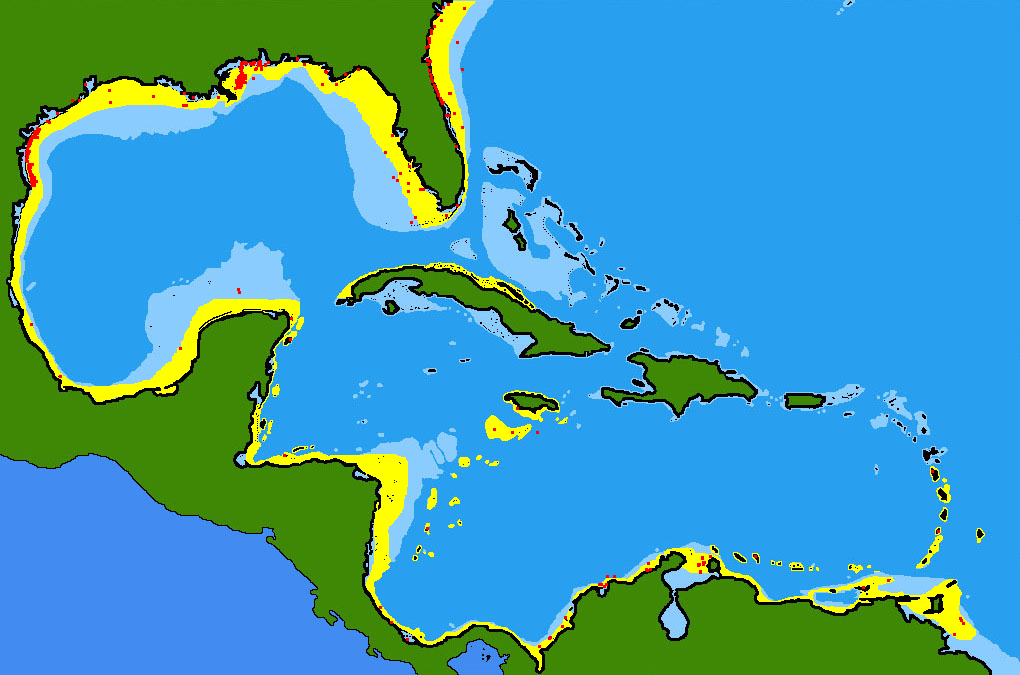

= Lesser electric ray =

Species of cartilaginous fish

The lesser electric ray (Narcine bancroftii), also known as the Brazilian electric ray, small electric ray, spotted torpedo ray, torpedofish or trembler, is a species of numbfish in the family Narcinidae found on the western coastal fringes of the Atlantic Ocean and Caribbean Sea. It is a small slow-moving fish, living in the surf zone of sandy or muddy beaches. Here it is easily caught as bycatch by shrimp fisheries and seine netters. The International Union for Conservation of Nature has rated it as being of "least concern".

== Description ==
This species of ray has a near-circular body and a short tail. It grows to approximately 45 centimeters (18 in) long, and 20 cm (8 in) wide, with colouration ranging from dark brown to reddish orange. It has irregular rings, sometimes oval in shape. The ventral surface ranges from white to greenish. It has tooth rows that vary in number from 17 to 34 in each jaw. This depends on the size of the specimen.

It has two electric organs, elongate in shape, that run from the front of the eyes, down to the rear end of the disc. These organs can generate a peak voltage of about 14 to 37 volts, which they use to stun prey and to defend themselves.

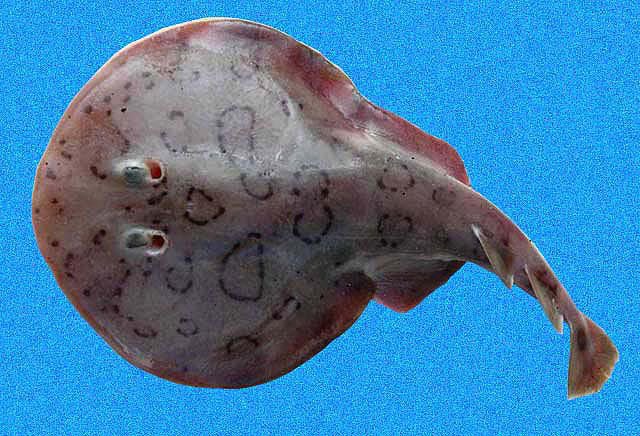

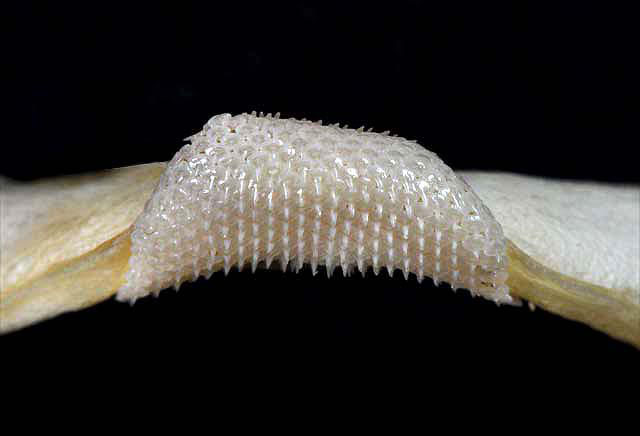
Upper teeth
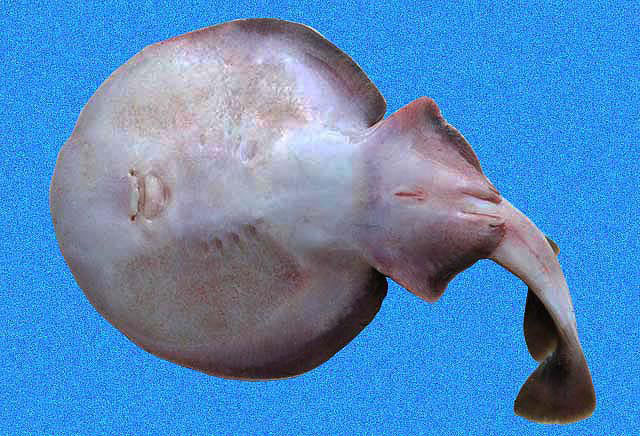

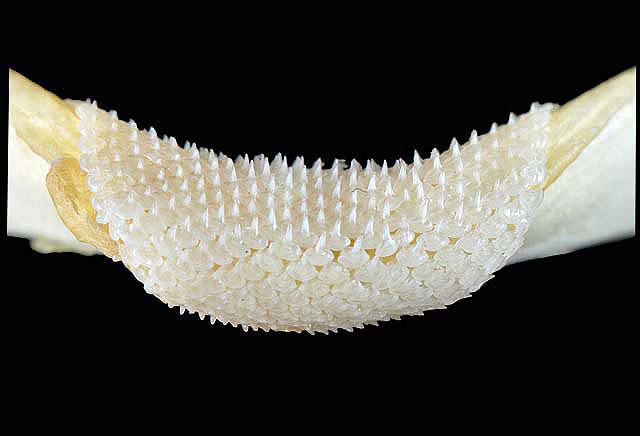
Lower teeth

== Distribution ==
This species is found in the Gulf of Mexico, and in the coastal waters of the western Atlantic Ocean from northeastern Brazil to North Carolina. It is also found in the Caribbean Sea and the West Indies.

== Habitat ==
The lesser electric ray is most commonly found under sand or mud, in intertidal shallow waters, but has been found at depths of up to 180 feet (55 m).

== Behavior ==
This species is nocturnal. It remains motionless during the daytime, and forages for food in the substrate at night. It is a sluggish swimmer and maintains a territory in the surf zone of the beach. Females mature at the age of two and produce as many as twenty live young at a time.

== Diet ==
Lesser electric rays feed mainly on polychaete annelids. They also eat benthic worms, juvenile snake eels, sea anemones, small bony fish and various crustaceans.

== Status ==
The lesser electric ray is caught as bycatch in coastal shrimp fisheries and in seine net fisheries. Its population in the Gulf of Mexico has decreased to about 2% of what it was in 1972, and similar catastrophic declines have been experienced elsewhere. In July, 2016 the US National Marine Fisheries Service (NMFS) conducted a thorough review of the status of the lesser electric ray because the original study used to justify the critically endangered designation was based on a very small sample size. This updated status review conducted by NMFS incorporated fisheries dependent and independent data and concluded that the population is "not currently in danger of extinction throughout all or a significant portion of its range and is not likely to become so within the foreseeable future". The International Union for Conservation of Nature has rated it as being of "least concern".
