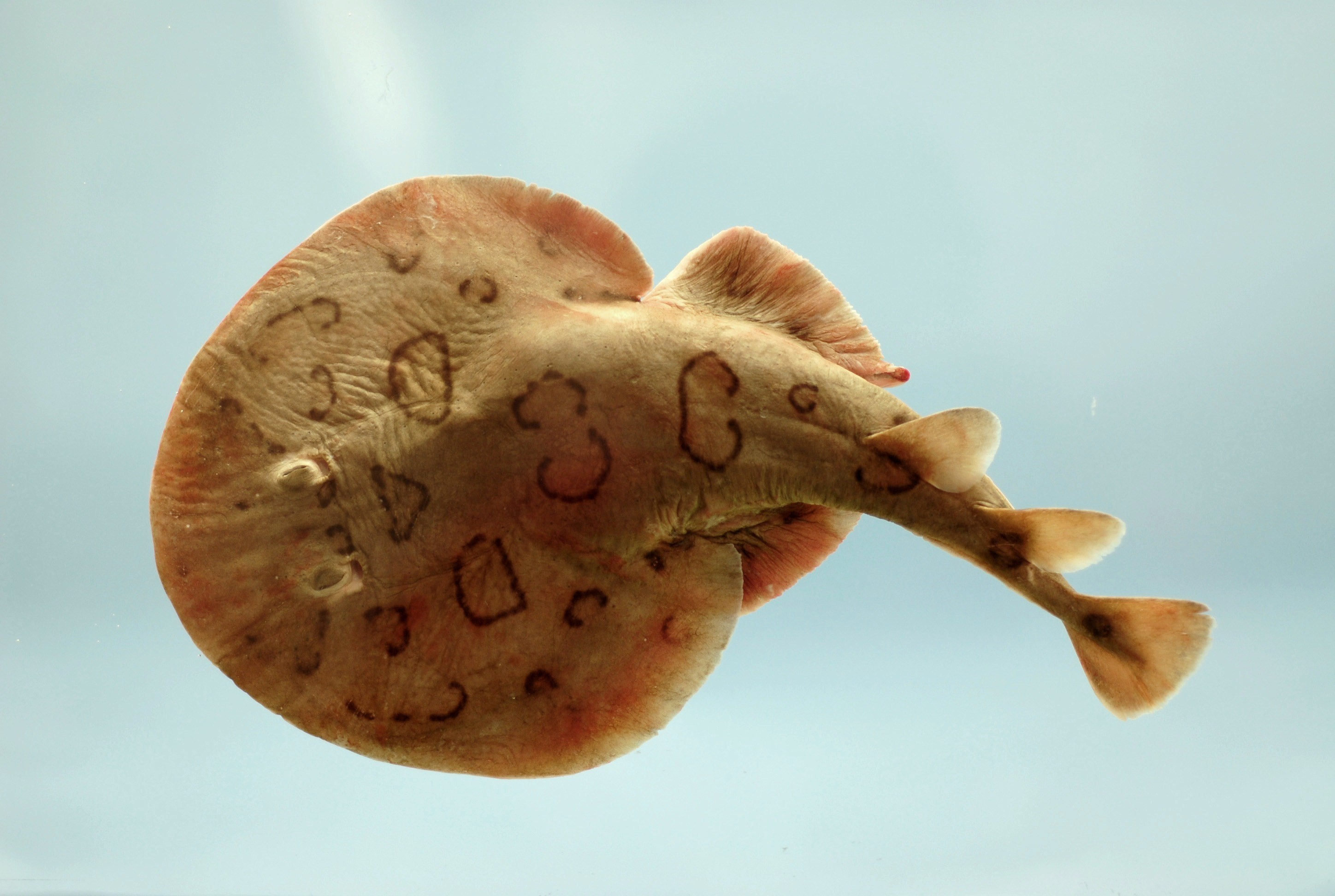
- Narcine bancroftii

Scientific classification
- Kingdom: Animalia
- Phylum: Chordata
- Class: Chondrichthyes
- Subclass: Elasmobranchii
- Order: Torpediniformes
- Family: Narcinidae
- Genus: Narcine; Henle, 1834

Type species
- Torpedo brasiliensis Olfers, 1831

Synonyms
- Cyclonarce Gill, 1862; Gonionarce Gill, 1862; Narcinops Whitley, 1940; Syrraxis Bonaparte (ex Jourdan), 1841

= Narcine =

Narcine Temporal range: 56–0 Ma Eocene to Present

Genus of cartilaginous fishes

Narcine is a genus of electric rays in the family Narcinidae. These species have a rounded pectoral fin disc and two dorsal fins, the first usually smaller than the second and placed behind the pelvic fin bases. The tail is longer than the disc and has a lateral fold. The spiracles are close behind the eyes, the nasal flaps are merged into a flap in front of the mouth. The teeth are nearly flat, with a central point.

== Species ==
There are currently 21 recognized species in this genus:

- Narcine atzi M. R. de Carvalho & J. E. Randall, 2003 (Atz's numbfish)
- Narcine baliensis M. R. de Carvalho & W. T. White, 2016
- Narcine bancroftii (E. Griffith & C. H. Smith, 1834) (Lesser electric ray)
- Narcine brasiliensis (Olfers, 1831) (Brazilian electric ray)
- Narcine brevilabiata Bessednov, 1966 (Short-lip electric ray)
- Narcine brunnea Annandale, 1909 (Brown numbfish)
- Narcine entemedor D. S. Jordan & Starks, 1895 (Giant electric ray)
- Narcine insolita M. R. de Carvalho, Séret & Compagno, 2002 (Madagascar numbfish)
- Narcine leoparda M. R. de Carvalho, 2001 (Leopard electric ray)
- Narcine lingula J. Richardson, 1846 (Chinese numbfish)
- Narcine maculata (G. Shaw, 1804) (Dark-finned numbfish)
- Narcine oculifera M. R. de Carvalho, Compagno & Mee, 2002 (Big-eye electric ray)
- Narcine prodorsalis Bessednov, 1966 (Tonkin numbfish)
- Narcine rierai (Lloris & Rucabado, 1991) (Slender electric ray)
- Narcine tasmaniensis J. Richardson, 1841 (Tasmanian numbfish)
- Narcine timlei (Bloch & J. G. Schneider, 1801) (Spotted numbfish)
- Narcine vermiculatus Breder, 1928 (Vermiculate electric ray)
