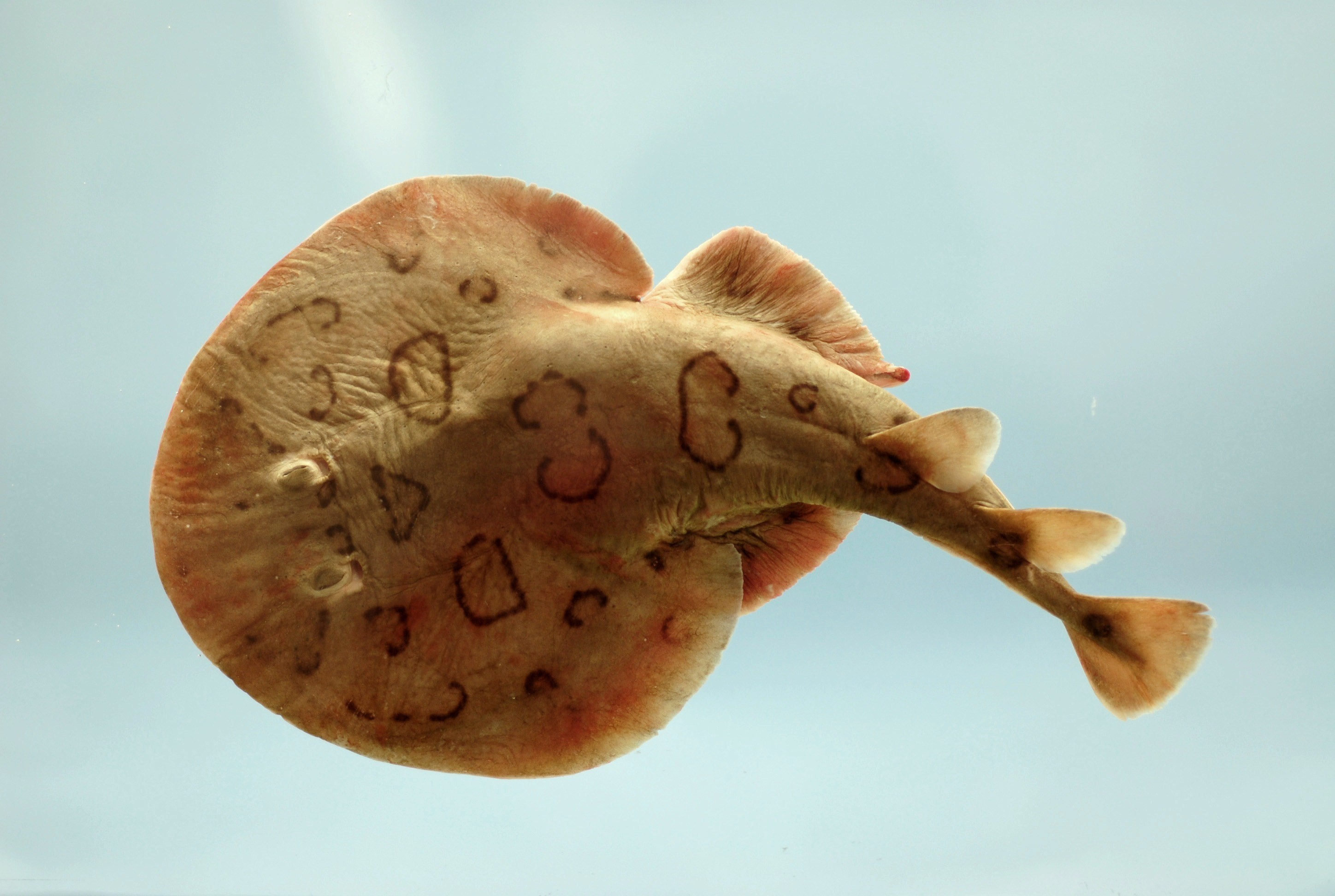
- Lesser electric ray, Narcine bancroftii

Scientific classification
- Kingdom: Animalia
- Phylum: Chordata
- Class: Chondrichthyes
- Subclass: Elasmobranchii
- Order: Torpediniformes
- Family: Narcinidae; T. N. Gill, 1862

= Narcinidae =

Narcinidae Temporal range: Early Eocene to present

Family of cartilaginous fishes

Narcinidae, or numbfishes, are a family of electric rays (order Torpediniformes). They are bottom-dwelling cartilaginous fishes with large, rounded pectoral fin discs and long tails. They can produce an electric discharge for defense, from which their scientific name is derived (Greek narke, meaning 'paralysis').

Members of this family are commonly known as the numbfishes, and are found almost worldwide in warm temperate and tropical continental and continental insular waters. They are strictly marine, so are absent from rivers and lakes. They occur in sandy beaches, muddy enclosed bays, estuaries, off coral reefs and river mouths, and on the upper continental slope to a depth of 1,071 m.

== Description ==
Small to medium-sized rays, adult numbfishes range from 15 to 66 cm long, though most are less than 50 cm. They have oval, rounded, or shovel-shaped pectoral discs and stout tails of equal or longer length. The snout is moderately elongated, rounded, or rounded-angular, differing from the narkids in being supported by broad rostral cartilages. The mouth is straight, with stout, elongated, and highly protrusible jaws and a prominent groove around its periphery. The nostrils are just forward of the mouth and connected to it by a broad groove; the nasal flaps are short, but merged into a broad nasal curtain that overlaps the mouth. The small teeth have a single moderate cusp; the teeth and tooth bands are exposed when the mouth is closed (except in Diplobatis). Two prominent dorsal fins of roughly equal size and a large caudal fin are present.

Numbfishes vary in color from whitish or yellowish to brownish, grey-brown, greenish, reddish, or black above, either plain or with small to large spots, blotches, bars or lines, sometimes forming complex eye-shaped spots or ocelli on the pectoral fins. They are usually white underneath, or black in deep-water species. The large, kidney-shaped electric organs at the base of the pectoral fins are visible through the skin.

== Biology and ecology ==
Numbfishes are slow-swimming bottom-dwellers that feed on small fishes and invertebrates off the bottom; their protrusible jaws aid in removing prey from the substrate. They can generate a moderate shock if disturbed and contact is made with the electric organs; the electrical discharges of narcinids have been measured at 8-37 volts, much less than the electric rays of the genus Torpedo. All species are ovoviviparous, with eggs hatching inside the mother.

== Genera ==
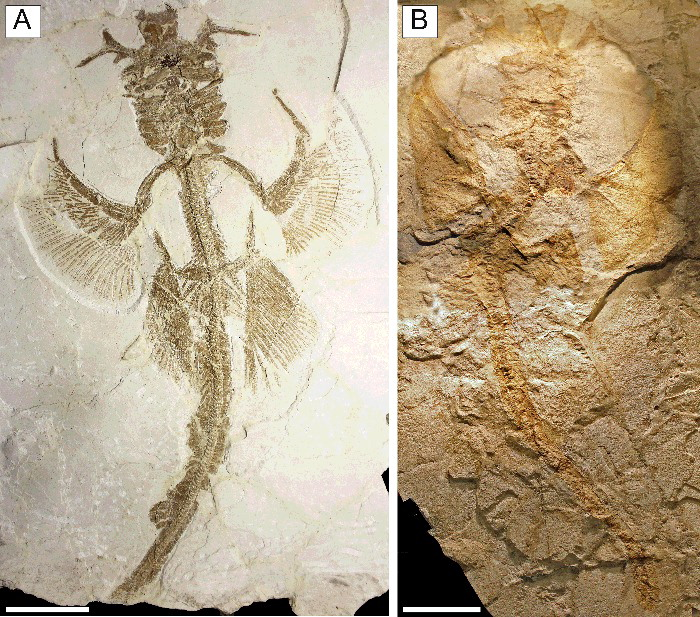
Fossil specimen of Titanonarke

These genera are included in this family:

- Benthobatis
- Diplobatis
- Discopyge
- Narcine
- Narcinops

The extinct genus Titanonarke is known from complete skeletons from the Early Eocene-aged Monte Bolca site of Italy. At nearly 1 metre (3.3 ft) in length, it is the largest narcinid known to have existed.
