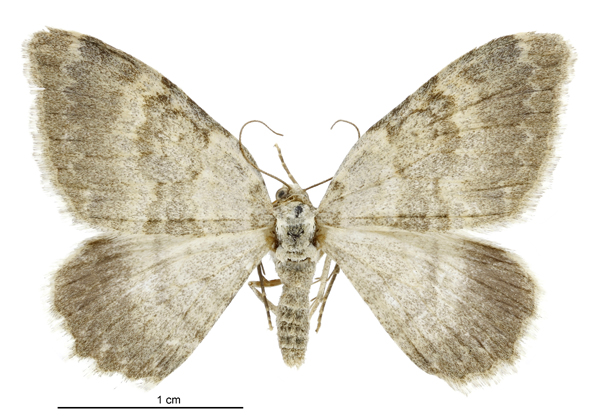
- Female

Conservation status
- Nationally Vulnerable (NZ TCS)

Scientific classification
- Kingdom: Animalia
- Phylum: Arthropoda
- Class: Insecta
- Order: Lepidoptera
- Family: Geometridae
- Genus: Gingidiobora
- Species: G. nebulosa

Binomial name
- Gingidiobora nebulosa (Philpott, 1917)

Synonyms
- Xanthorhoe nebulosa Philpott, 1917

= Gingidiobora nebulosa =

Species of moth

Gingidiobora nebulosa, the gingidium looper moth, is a moth in the family Crambidae. It is endemic to New Zealand. This species has been classified as Nationally Vulnerable by the Department of Conservation.

== Taxonomy ==
This species was first described by Alfred Philpott in 1917 and named Xanthorhoe nebulosa. Philpott used specimens collected in February and March at The Bluff, Waiau Toa / Clarence River and at Coverham, Marlborough by Dr. J. A. Thomson and Hugh Hamilton. George Vernon Hudson described and illustrated the species in 1928. In 1987 Robin C. Craw placed this species within the genus Gingidiobora. The type specimen is held at Museum of New Zealand Te Papa Tongarewa.

== Description ==
The larvae are green and smooth.

Philpott described the adults of the species as follows:

♂︎♀︎. 34 mm. Head, thorax, and abdomen whitish-ochreous finely sprinkled with fuscous. Antennae in ♂︎ with rather short pectinations. Forewings triangular, costa strongly arched, sinuate at middle, apex moderately sharp, termen subsinuate, oblique; ochreous-grey-whitish; termen broadly margined with greyish-fuscous; costal edge very narrowly fuscous; a thin curved brown line near base; first line (anterior edge of median band) irregularly subdentate, curved, brown, from 1/3 costa to 1/3 dorsum; second line (posterior edge of median band) irregular, slight triple projection at middle, excurved beneath, from 2/3 costa to 3/4 dorsum, brown; an obscure waved pale subterminal line : cilia greyish-ochreous. Hindwings ochreous-grey-whitish; a median fascia and a broad terminal band greyish-fuscous : cilia greyish-ochreous.

== Distribution ==
G. nebulosa is endemic to New Zealand. As well as its type locality of Coverham and The Bluff, Clarence River, this species has been found at the Tone River bed and at Ka Whata Tu o Rakihouia Conservation Park in Marlborough. It is also present at Macraes Ponds in Waitaki, and in Otago.

== Biology and life cycle ==
The larvae feed at night. The species is most commonly seen in March.

== Host plant ==
The larvae of G. nebulosa feed on mountain carrot, Gingidia montana. This plant suffers from browse reduction which in turn affects the moth population.

== Conservation status ==
This species has the "Nationally Vulnerable" conservation status under the New Zealand Threat Classification System.
