= Electrolux (disambiguation) =

Electrolux can refer to:

- Aerus LLC, Formerly Electrolux USA, a North American manufacturer of vacuum cleaners that once sold Electrolux Group products.
- Electrolux (The Electrolux Group), a Swedish manufacturer of appliances and vacuum cleaners.
- Electrolux addisoni, an electric ray fish of the genus Electrolux.
