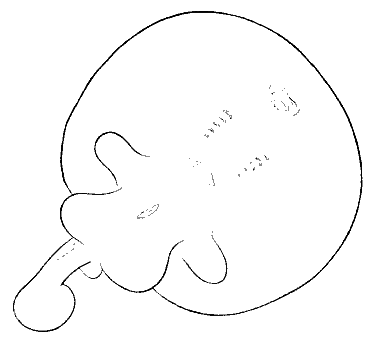

Conservation status
- Least Concern (IUCN 3.1)

Scientific classification
- Kingdom: Animalia
- Phylum: Chordata
- Class: Chondrichthyes
- Subclass: Elasmobranchii
- Order: Torpediniformes
- Family: Narkidae
- Genus: Typhlonarke
- Species: T. aysoni

Binomial name
- Typhlonarke aysoni (A. Hamilton, 1902)

Synonyms
- Astrape aysoni A. Hamilton, 1902

= Blind electric ray =

Species of cartilaginous fish

The blind electric ray (Typhlonarke aysoni) is a little-known species of sleeper ray in the family Narkidae, endemic to New Zealand. It is found on the bottom, typically at a depth of 300–400 m (980–1,310 ft). Reaching 38 cm (15 in) in length, this species has a thin, nearly circular pectoral fin disc without visible eyes, and a short tail with a single dorsal fin. Its pelvic fins are divided in two, with the anterior portion forming a limb-like appendage; in males the claspers do not extend past the disc margin. A weak swimmer, the blind electric ray likely pushes itself along using its pelvic fins. It is known to feed on polychaete worms, and can defend itself with an electric shock. Reproduction is aplacental viviparous. The International Union for Conservation of Nature (IUCN) does not have enough information to assess the conservation status of this species.

== Taxonomy ==
The trawler Doto collected the first known specimen of the blind electric ray from the Foveaux Strait, during a research cruise in early 1900. The head of the expedition Lake F. Ayson gave the specimen to Augustus Hamilton of the Dominion Museum, who named it Astrape aysoni in his honor. Hamilton published his account of the species in a 1902 volume of the scientific journal Transactions and Proceedings of the New Zealand Institute. In 1909, Edgar R. Waite created the new genus Typhlonarke for this species. The blind electric ray may also be referred to as the blind legged torpedo or the round electric ray.

== Distribution and habitat ==
The exact range of the blind electric ray is uncertain owing to confusion with the oval electric ray. The two species are found off the eastern coast of New Zealand, from the East Cape of North Island to the Snares Shelf south of South Island, including the Cook and Foveaux Straits and the Stewart and Chatham Islands. This bottom-dwelling species typically occurs at a depth of 300–400 m (980–1,310 ft), but has been reported from between 46 and 800 m (151 and 2,625 ft) deep.

== Description ==
The blind electric ray has a nearly circular pectoral fin disc measuring about 70% of the total length, with rather thin margins. The tiny eyes are not visible externally, being located 1–2 mm (0.039–0.079 in) beneath the surface of the skin; their positions are indicated by small white patches. Following the eyes are oval spiracles with raised, smooth rims. The nostrils are closely spaced, with their outer margins curled to form near-complete tubes, and their inner margins enlarged and fused together into a fleshy, skirt-shaped curtain that almost reaches the mouth. The mouth is small and deeply recessed. The teeth are arranged with a quincunx pattern to form narrow plates limited to the front of the jaws. There are 10–12 tooth rows in either jaw; the innermost teeth have a sharp cusp, while the outermost teeth are worn down and flattened. The five pairs of gill slits are short and curved.

The anterior portion of each pelvic fin is modified into a wide, paddle-like appendage. The posterior portion of the pelvic fins merge smoothly with the pectoral fins to form part of the disc; there is a notch where their margins meet the tail. Adult males have relatively small, slightly flattened claspers whose tips do not extend past the disc margin. The single dorsal fin is rectangular in shape with a rounded trailing margin, and originates over the rear of the pelvic fin bases. The short, thick tail bears faint lateral skin folds along either side and terminates in a nearly circular caudal fin slightly longer than tall. The skin is entirely devoid of dermal denticles. This species is uniformly brown above, becoming darker towards the tail, and beige below. The undersides of the pelvic fin appendages are nearly white. Most blind electric rays do not exceed 38 cm (15 in) in length. However, there is an old report of a specimen that may have been over 1.1 m (3.6 ft) long.

== Biology and ecology ==
With flabby musculature and a reduced tail, the blind electric ray seems to have very limited swimming capability. Instead, it is inferred to "walk" along the bottom on its mobile pelvic fin appendages. A blind predator that probably feeds via suction, this species is known to consume polychaete worms. Like other electric rays, it has a pair of kidney-shaped electric organs located beside its head, that allow it to generate an electric shock for defense. Each electric organ is made of 180–200 relatively large, fluid-filled hexagonal columns, which essentially act as batteries connected in parallel. A known parasite of this species is the tapeworm Pentaloculum macrocephalum. The blind electric ray is aplacental viviparous, with females bearing litters of up to 11. The newborns measure 9–10 cm (3.5–3.9 in) long.

== Human interactions ==
The blind electric ray is caught in bottom trawls and may be threatened by commercial fisheries within its range. However, specific data is lacking and the International Union for Conservation of Nature (IUCN) has listed it under Data Deficient. In June 2018 the New Zealand Department of Conservation classified the blind electric ray as "Not Threatened" with the qualifier "Data Poor" under the New Zealand Threat Classification System.
