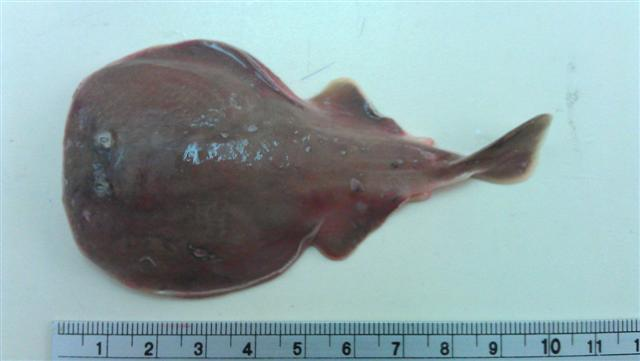

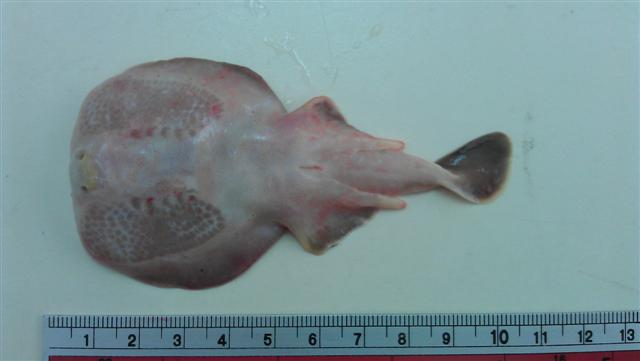

Conservation status
- Vulnerable (IUCN 3.1)

Scientific classification
- Kingdom: Animalia
- Phylum: Chordata
- Class: Chondrichthyes
- Subclass: Elasmobranchii
- Order: Torpediniformes
- Family: Narkidae
- Genus: Temera; J. E. Gray, 1831
- Species: T. hardwickii

Binomial name
- Temera hardwickii J. E. Gray, 1831
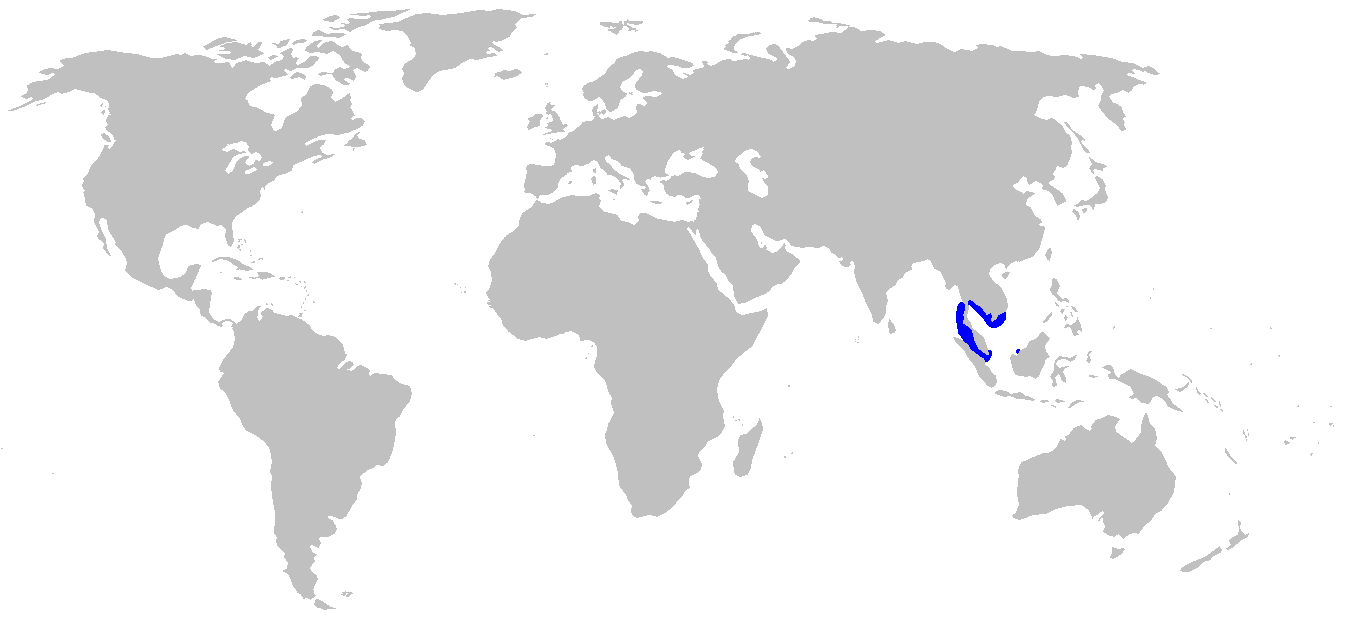
- Range of the finless sleeper ray

= Finless sleeper ray =

Species of cartilaginous fish

The finless sleeper ray (Temera hardwickii) is a species of electric ray in the family Narkidae, and the sole member of its genus. It is found over the continental shelf of Southeast Asia from the eastern Andaman Sea to Vietnam and Borneo. Typically growing no more than 15 cm (5.9 in) long, it may be the smallest cartilaginous fish. The finless sleeper ray is the only electric ray that lacks dorsal fins. It has an oval pectoral fin disc that varies from longer than wide to wider than long, depending on age, and a short, robust tail that terminates in a short, deep caudal fin. The trailing margins of its pelvic fins are sexually dimorphic, being more concave in males.

Like other members of its family, the finless sleeper ray can generate a defensive electric shock from paired electric organs in its disc. It gives birth to live young, with the developing embryos nourished by yolk. A litter size of four has been recorded from one individual. The International Union for Conservation of Nature (IUCN) has assessed the finless sleeper ray as Vulnerable. This slow-reproducing species is caught by intensive bottom trawl and possibly other fisheries throughout its range, which likely cause high mortality regardless of whether it is discarded or utilised.

== Taxonomy and phylogeny ==
The finless sleeper ray was described as a new species and genus by English zoologist John Edward Gray in an 1831 issue of the scientific journal Zoological Miscellany. His account was based on two specimens collected from Penang in Malaysia by General Thomas Hardwicke and presented to the British Museum. Hence, Gray named the ray Temera hardwickii, or "Hardwicke's Temera". He noted that the new genus was most closely affiliated to the genus Narke, because it has no dorsal fins while Narke has only one and other electric rays have two. A 2012 phylogenetic study, based on morphology, corroborated the close relationship between Temera and Narke.

== Description ==
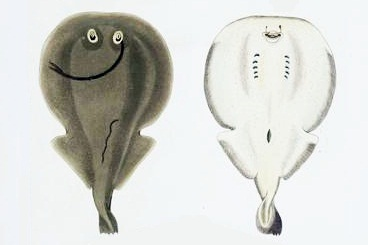
The finless sleeper ray can be identified by its lack of dorsal fins.

The pectoral fin disc of the finless sleeper ray is oval in shape; it is slightly wider than long in adults, and circular or longer than wide in juveniles. The small and bulging eyes are immediately followed by smooth-rimmed spiracles of roughly equal size. A pair of kidney-shaped electric organs are visible beneath the skin on either side of the head. A curtain of skin, reaching the mouth, is present between the small, circular nostrils. The nostrils are connected to the corners of the mouth by a pair of grooves. The small mouth is gently arched and protrusible. The flattened teeth have hexagonal bases and are arranged into narrow bands. There are five pairs of short gill slits.

The pelvic fins are only slightly overlapped by the disc; each is long, wide, and roughly triangular, with trailing margins that are more concave in males than in females. The tail is stout and much shorter than the disc. Unique amongst electric rays, there are no dorsal fins. The tail terminates in a fairly large, triangular caudal fin about as long as wide, with rounded corners. The skin entirely lacks dermal denticles. This species is plain light brown dorsally, sometimes with darker markings and whitish spots, and pale ventrally, with broad darker margins on the pectoral and pelvic fins. Possibly the smallest cartilaginous fish, the smallest known adult finless sleeper ray measured only 8.2 cm (3.2 in) long and weighed 13 g (0.46 oz). Few individuals exceed 15 cm (5.9 in) and the maximum length is thought to be 18 cm (7.1 in), though there is a dubious old record of a specimen 46 cm (18 in) long.

== Distribution and habitat ==
The range of the finless sleeper ray extends from the eastern Andaman Sea, near southern border between Thailand and Myanmar, through the Strait of Malacca to Singapore, and northward to Vietnam. Its exact distribution off Thailand is uncertain. There is a single record of this species from Sarawak in Borneo. This bottom-dwelling species inhabits fine sediment habitat over the continental shelf in both inshore and offshore waters. In the 19th century, it was reportedly abundant year-round in the Straits of Malacca. It is locally common in some areas.

== Biology and ecology ==
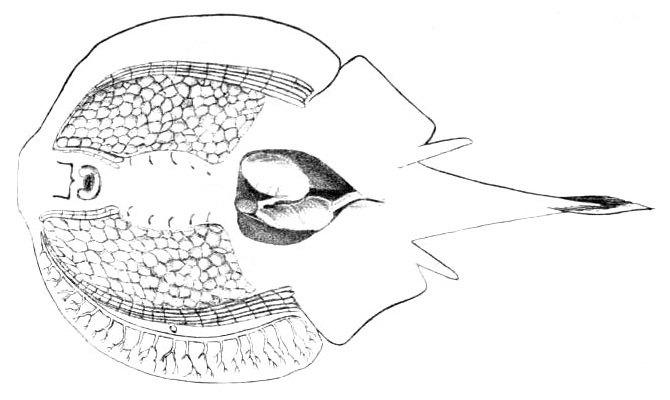
Drawing of selected anatomy of the finless sleeper ray; note the large electric organs on either side of the disc.

The finless sleeper ray can produce a moderate electric shock for defence against predators. The shock originates from the two electric organs, each about one-third as long as the ray. The organs consist of numerous fluid-filled pentagonal or hexagonal columns, which essentially act as batteries connected in parallel. This species probably feeds on small invertebrates. The robust structure of its jaws suggest that it may prefer hard-shelled prey. Theodore Edward Cantor wrote in an 1850 account that this species was often infested by minute worms under the skin, which he termed "Cysteocercus temerae" and classified as "entozoa" (an obsolete grouping that included acanthocephalans, trematodes, cestodes, and nematodes).

Reproduction in the finless sleeper ray is viviparous, with the embryos sustained through gestation by a yolk sac. A single account exists of a pregnant female 10.5 cm (4.1 in) long that contained four late-term foetuses each 2.9 cm (1.1 in) long; the young were similar in form and colouration to the adult, but had thicker discs. Males reach sexual maturity at around 8.2–10.9 cm (3.2–4.3 in) in length, and females at around 10.5–14.8 cm (4.1–5.8 in) in length.

== Human interactions ==
The finless sleeper ray is susceptible to bottom trawls and perhaps other demersal fishing gear. It is a potential bycatch of fisheries operating throughout its range, which are particularly intense in the Andaman Sea. Most individuals caught are probably discarded, though post-capture survival rates are believed to be extremely low. Additionally, catches of this species by Burmese fishers are often sold in Phuket in Thailand. Due to heavy fishing pressure within its range and its low reproductive rate, the finless sleeper ray has been assessed as Vulnerable by the International Union for Conservation of Nature (IUCN). Specific population data are lacking, but at least off Thailand electric ray populations overall appear to have declined since 1975.
