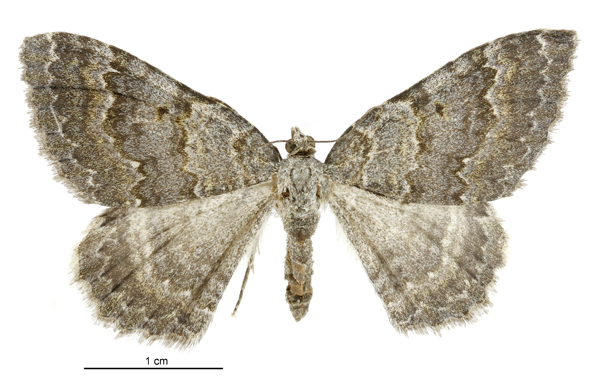
- Female
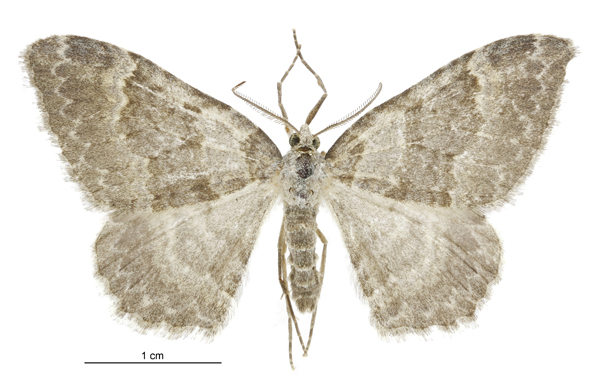
- Male

Conservation status
- Declining (NZ TCS)

Scientific classification
- Kingdom: Animalia
- Phylum: Arthropoda
- Class: Insecta
- Order: Lepidoptera
- Family: Geometridae
- Genus: Gingidiobora
- Species: G. subobscurata

Binomial name
- Gingidiobora subobscurata (Walker, 1862)

Synonyms
- Scotosia subobscurata Walker, 1862; Cidaria ascotata Felder & Rogenhofer, 1875; Xanthorhoe subobscurata (Walker, 1862); Larentia petropola Meyrick, 1883; Larentia subobscurata (Walker, 1862)

= Gingidiobora subobscurata =

Species of moth

Gingidiobora subobscurata is a species of moth in the family Crambidae. It is endemic to New Zealand. This species has been classified as "At Risk, Declining" by the Department of Conservation.

== Taxonomy ==
This species was first described by Francis Walker in 1862 and named Scotosia subobscurata. Walker stated he examined a specimen collected in Auckland by T. R. Oxley. This holotype specimen is held at the Natural History Museum, London. In 1875, thinking they were describing a new species, Alois Friedrich Rogenhofer, Baron Cajetan von Felder and Rudolf Felder named the moth Cidaria ascotata and illustrated it. This name was synonymised by Louis Beethoven Prout in 1927 when he placed the species within the genus Xanthorhoe. Edward Meyrick also described this species in 1883 thinking it was new to science. He named it Larentia petropola. Meyrick subsequently realised that the moth he described was the same species as that described by Walker. In 1884 Meyrick went on to synonymise his name with Scotosia subobscurata but placed the species within the genus Larentia. George Vernon Hudson discussed the species as Xanthorhoe subobscurata in 1898 and mentioned that both Scotosia subobscurata and Larentia petropola were synonyms. Again using the name Xanthorhoe subobscurata Hudson also described and illustrated the species in 1928. In 1987 Robin C. Craw placed this species within the genus Gingidiobora thus its current name is Gingidiobora subobscurata.

== Description ==
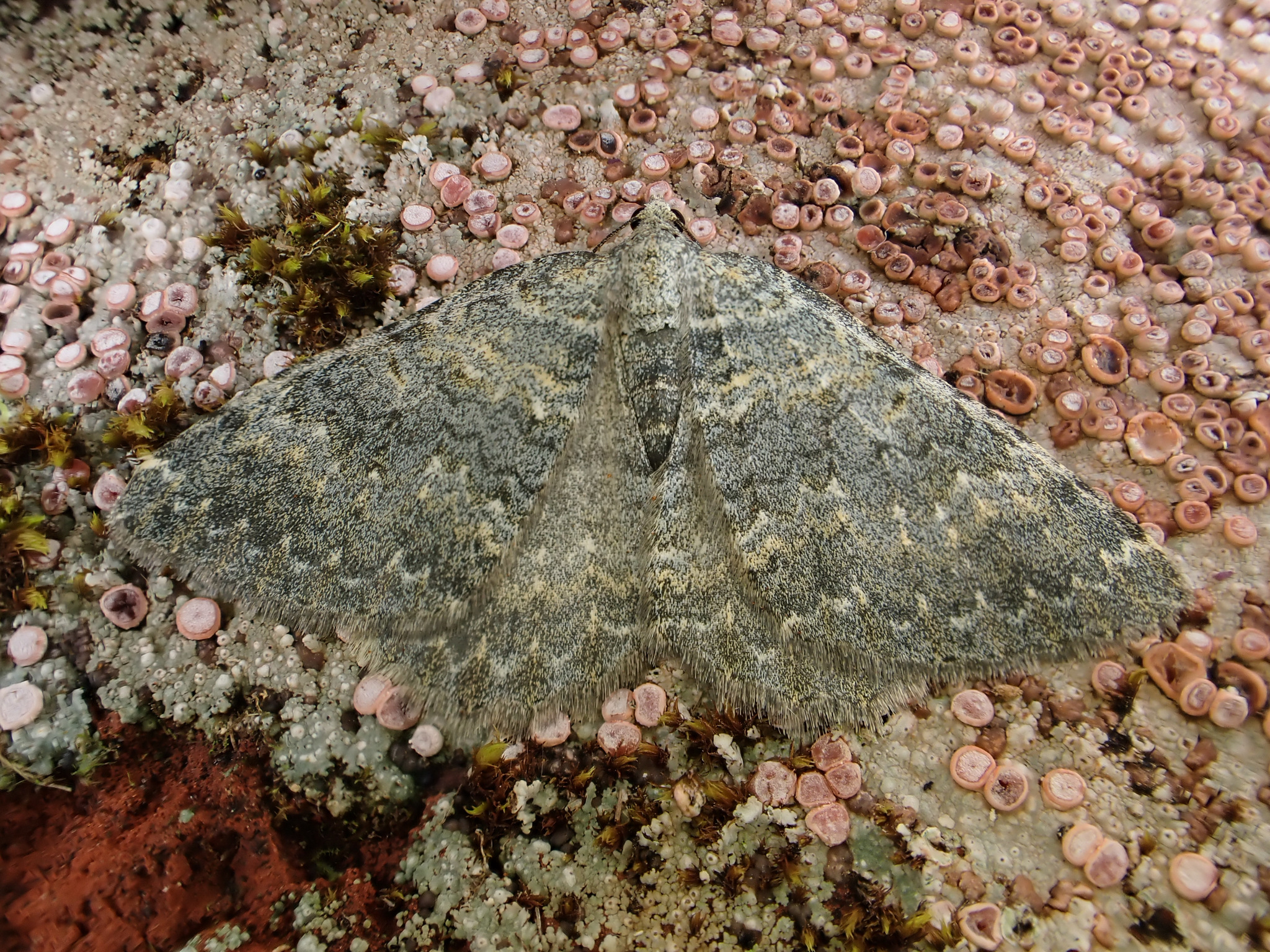
Observation of G. subobscurata

Larvae of this species are green and smooth.

Meyrick mentioned that the adults have a bluish tinge. Hudson described the adult moth as follows:

The expansion of the wings is 39mm. (1 1/2 inches). Fore-wings moderate, termen rounded dark grey, densely irrorated with bluish-whitish; costa broadly suffused with ochreous-whitish anteriorly; a very obscure curved ochreous-whitish line towards base, anteriorly dark-margined; two obscure curved subdentate adjacent whitish lines about one-third, followed by a dark line; a blackish discal dot; a very irregular dentate curved dark grey line beyond middle, followed by two adjacent whitish lines; a sharply dentate obscure whitish subterminal line, anteriorly dark-margined. Hind-wings moderate, termen rounded; markings as in fore-wings, but more obscure, paler and more suffused towards base.

== Distribution ==
G. subobscurata is endemic to New Zealand. This species has occurred in Nelson, Otira Gorge at Arthur's Pass, Queenstown, and at Bold Peak at Lake Wakatipu.

== Life cycle and behaviour ==
Adult moths are on the wing from January to March. They are rare but tend to frequent bare rocky areas approximately 600m or more above sea-level.

== Habitat and host plant ==
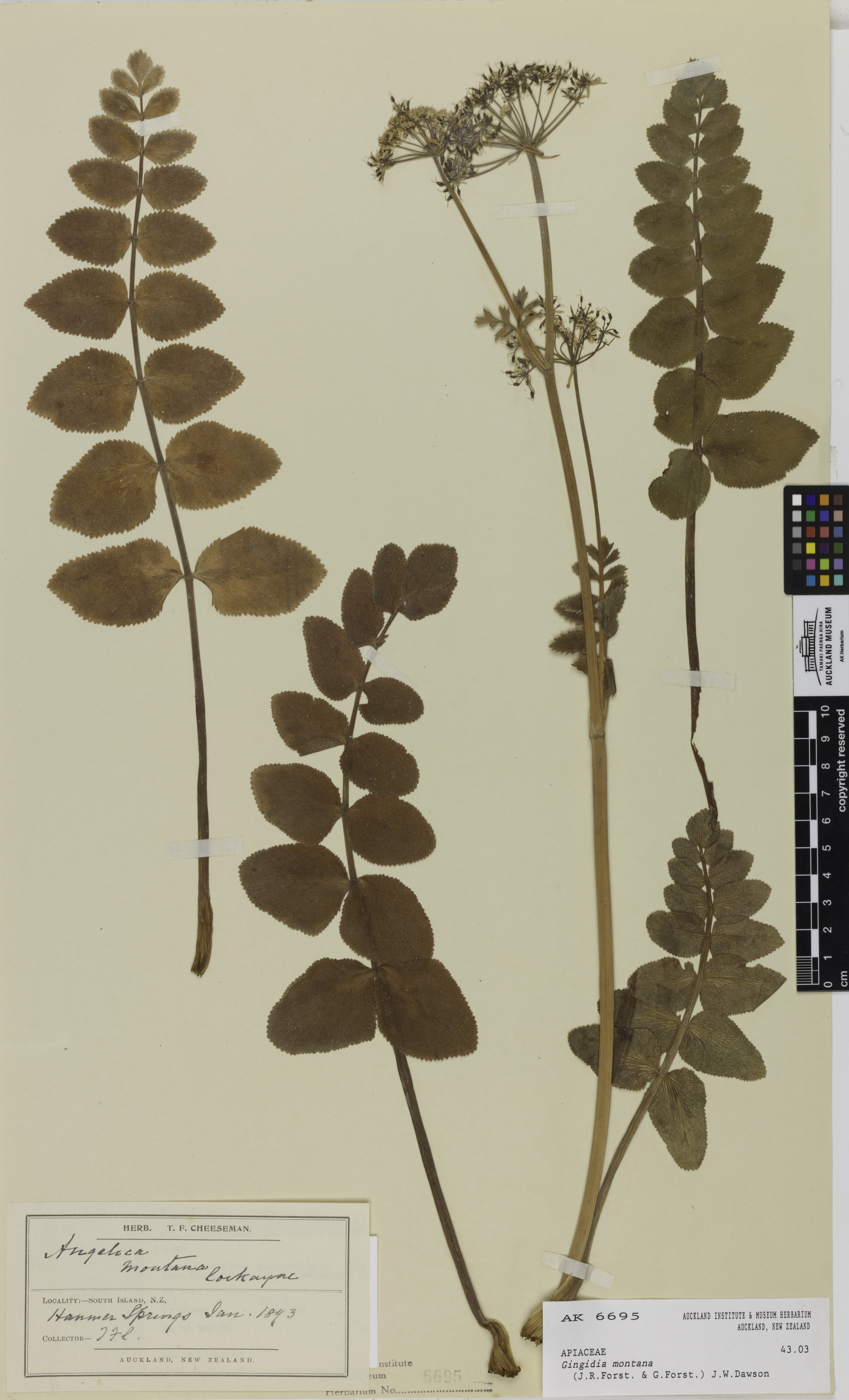
Gingidia montana, host species of G. subobscurata.

This species inhabits the higher-rainfall upland and montane sites of the South Island. Larvae feed on Gingidia montana, also known as mountain aniseed. This is a plant that has been declining as a result of its attractiveness to browsing animals.

== Conservation status ==
G. subobscurata has been given the "At Risk, Declining" conservation status under the New Zealand Threat Classification System.
