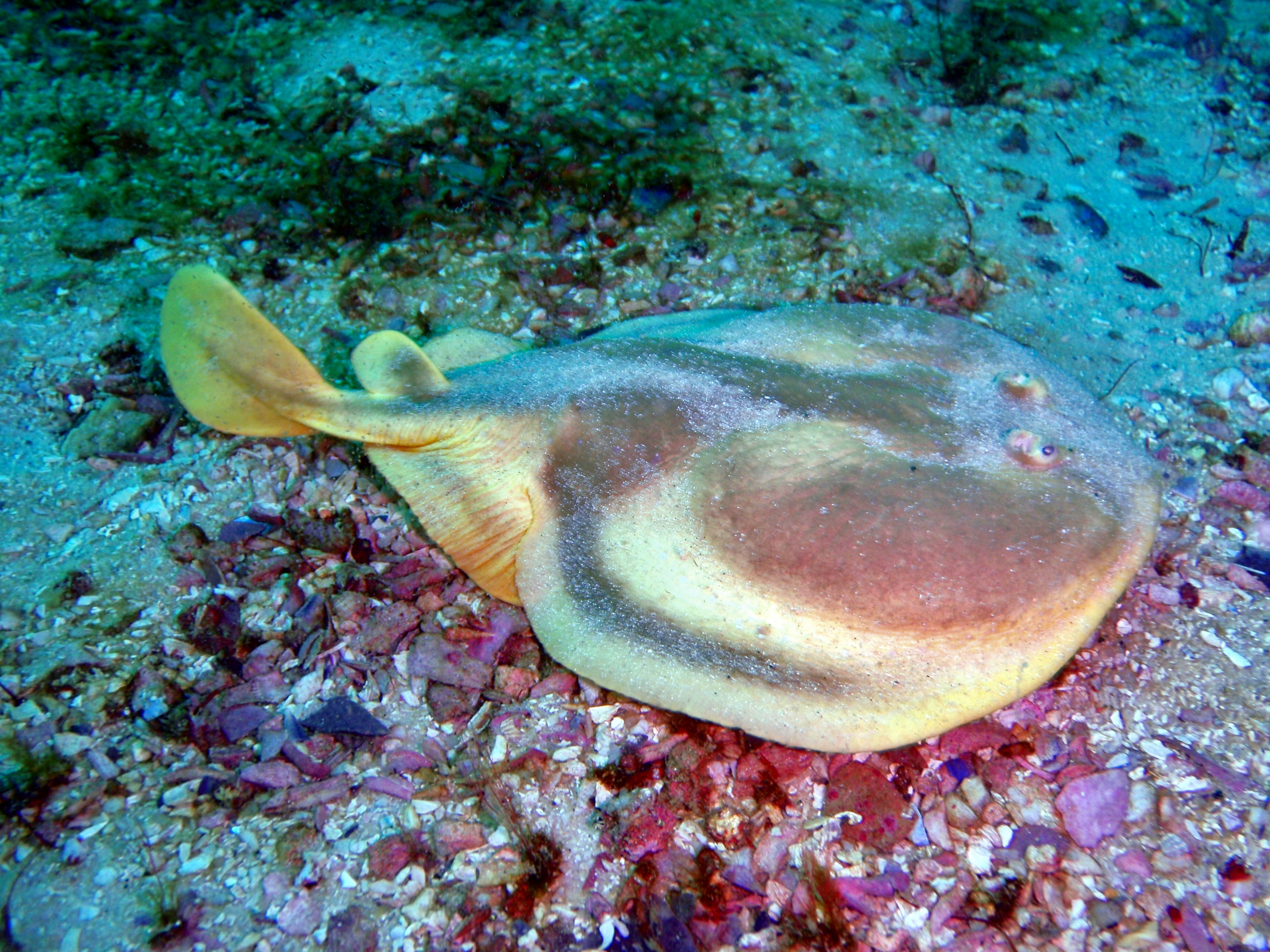
- Onefin electric ray (Narke capensis)

Scientific classification
- Kingdom: Animalia
- Phylum: Chordata
- Class: Chondrichthyes
- Subclass: Elasmobranchii
- Order: Torpediniformes
- Family: Narkidae; Fowler, 1934

= Narkidae =

Sleeper rays

Family of cartilaginous fishes

Members of the family Narkidae are commonly known as sleeper rays. They are restricted to the temperate and tropical Indo-West Pacific from South Africa to Japan to Indonesia, and are exclusively marine and are absent from freshwater habitats. They occur from the intertidal zone to the continental shelf and the upper continental slope to a depth of 350 meters, favoring soft-bottomed habitats.

== Description ==
Adult sleeper rays range in size from 8 to 46 cm in length and have flattened oval, circular, or pear-shaped pectoral fin discs. They have naked skin, without dermal denticles or thorns. The snout is moderately elongate and broadly rounded, with the rostral cartilage reduced to a slender medial rod. This distinguishes the narkids from the family Narcinidae, which have somewhat longer snouts supported by broad rostral cartilages. The mouth is straight, very narrow, and not highly protrusible, with strong labial folds and a weak groove around the periphery. The nostrils are placed just forward of the mouth and are connected to it by a broad nasoral groove; the nasal flaps are long and fused into a central nasal curtain that overlaps the mouth.

There are a pair of large kidney-shaped electric organs at the base of the pectoral fins, visible through the skin. The genera Heteronarce and Electrolux have two large dorsal fins, Narke, Crassinarke, and Typhlonarke have a single dorsal fin, and Temera has none. No other group of electric rays have genera with a variable number of dorsal fins. The tail is moderately long, with a large, rounded, symmetrical caudal fin. The color is usually brown or reddish brown above, white or brownish below. There may be spots, blotches, or bands on the dorsal surface, but most species lack complex color patterns or ocelli.

== Biology and ecology ==
Sleeper rays are bottom-dwelling, slow-moving fishes often found on soft mud or sand. From those species that have been examined, their diet may be restricted to small, soft-bodied, bottom invertebrates, such as polychaete worms. They can generate a strong electric shock as a defense mechanism. Reproduction is ovoviviparous, with eggs hatching inside the mother.

== Species ==
- Genus Crassinarke Takagi, 1951
  - Crassinarke dormitor Takagi, 1951 (Sleeper torpedo)
- Genus Electrolux Compagno & Heemstra, 2007
  - Electrolux addisoni Compagno & Heemstra, 2007 (Ornate sleeper-ray)
- Genus Heteronarce Regan, 1921
  - Heteronarce bentuviai (Baranes & Randall, 1989) (Elat electric ray)
  - Heteronarce garmani Regan, 1921 (Natal electric ray)
  - Heteronarce mollis (Lloyd, 1907) (Soft electric ray)
  - Heteronarce prabhui Talwar, 1981 (Quilon electric ray)
- Genus Narke Kaup, 1826
  - Narke capensis (Gmelin, 1789) (Onefin electric ray)
  - Narke dipterygia (Bloch & Schneider, 1801) (Numbray)
  - Narke japonica (Temminck & Schlegel, 1850) (Japanese sleeper ray)
- Genus Temera J. E. Gray, 1831
  - Temera hardwickii J. E. Gray, 1831 (Finless sleeper ray)
- Genus Typhlonarke Waite, 1909
  - Typhlonarke aysoni (A. Hamilton, 1902) (Blind electric ray)
  - Typhlonarke tarakea Phillipps, 1929 (Oval electric ray)
