= Heteronarce bentuviai =

Conservation status
- Data Deficient (IUCN 3.1)

Scientific classification
- Kingdom: Animalia
- Phylum: Chordata
- Class: Chondrichthyes
- Subclass: Elasmobranchii
- Order: Torpediniformes
- Family: Narkidae
- Genus: Heteronarce; Regan, 1921
- Species: H. bentuviai

Binomial name
- Heteronarce bentuviai Baranes & J. E. Randall, 1989

Species of cartilaginous fish

Heteronarce bentuviai, also known as the Eilat electric ray, Ben-Tuvia's sleeper ray or the Eilat sleeper Ray, is a species of ray in the family Narkidae.

== Distribution ==
H. bentuviai can be found in the Western Indian Ocean, in the Gulf of Aden and the Red Sea at depths of up to 200 m (660 ft). It can be found along the coasts of several countries, including Yemen, Israel, Egypt, Saudi Arabia and Jordan.

== Habitat and behaviour ==
H. bentuviai likes to live in the outer continental shelf of marine environments. It likes soft substrate, like sand or mud. When hunting, the ray likes to bury itself in the sand to hide from its prey. When it sees a prey item, it quickly pounces on it, wrapping its fins around the animal and delivering a powerful electric shock.

== Diet ==
Not much is known about the feeding habits of this species, but it probably feeds on invertebrates like crustaceans and polychaete worms.

== Size and appearance ==
It has a flat, disc-shaped body with a short tail, it measures around 17.6 cm (6.9 in). On its short tail, it has its caudal and dorsal fins. It is a light brown, with large dark spots around the back of the body.

== Conservation status ==
H. bentuviai is given the status of Data Deficient as not enough is known about the species to give a status. There are also no known threats or population trends of the species.
