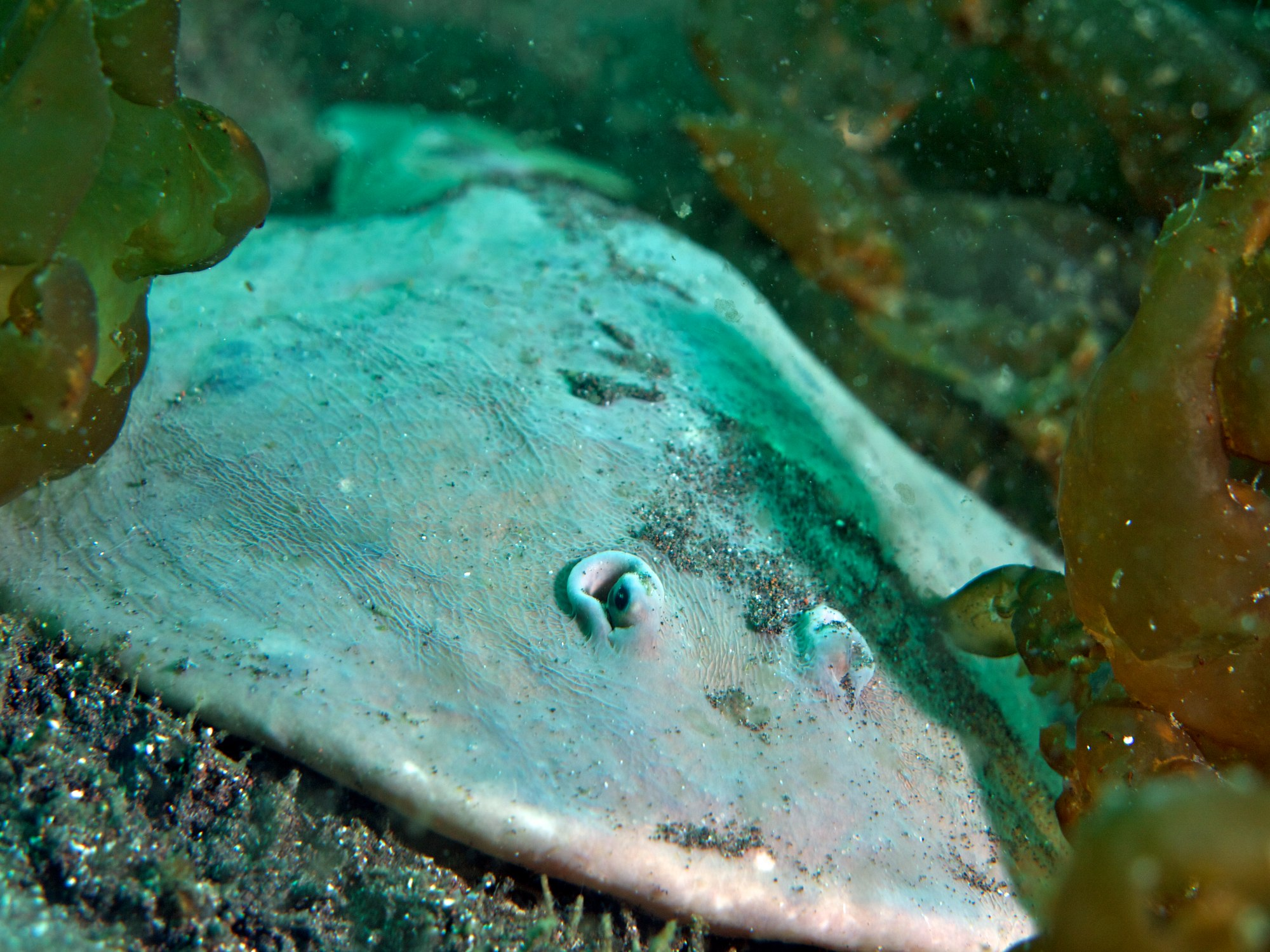
- Japanese sleeper ray (N. japonica)

Scientific classification
- Kingdom: Animalia
- Phylum: Chordata
- Class: Chondrichthyes
- Subclass: Elasmobranchii
- Order: Torpediniformes
- Family: Narkidae
- Genus: Narke; Kaup, 1826

Type species
- Raja capensis Gmelin, 1789

Synonyms
- Astrape Müller & Henle, 1837; Bengalichthys Annandale, 1909

= Narke (fish) =

Genus of cartilaginous fishes

Narke (from ancient Greek ναρκῶ narkō, "to make numb") is a genus of electric rays in the family Narkidae, found in the western Indo-Pacific and off southern Africa. They have nearly circular pectoral fin discs and short, thick tails with large caudal fins, and can be identified by their single dorsal fin (a trait shared only by Typhlonarke within the family). There are three described species, as well as a fourth undescribed dwarf species from Taiwan.

== Species ==
- Narke capensis J. F. Gmelin, 1789 (Onefin electric ray)
- Narke dipterygia Bloch & Schneider, 1801 (Numbray)
- Narke japonica Temminck & Schlegel, 1850 (Japanese sleeper ray)
