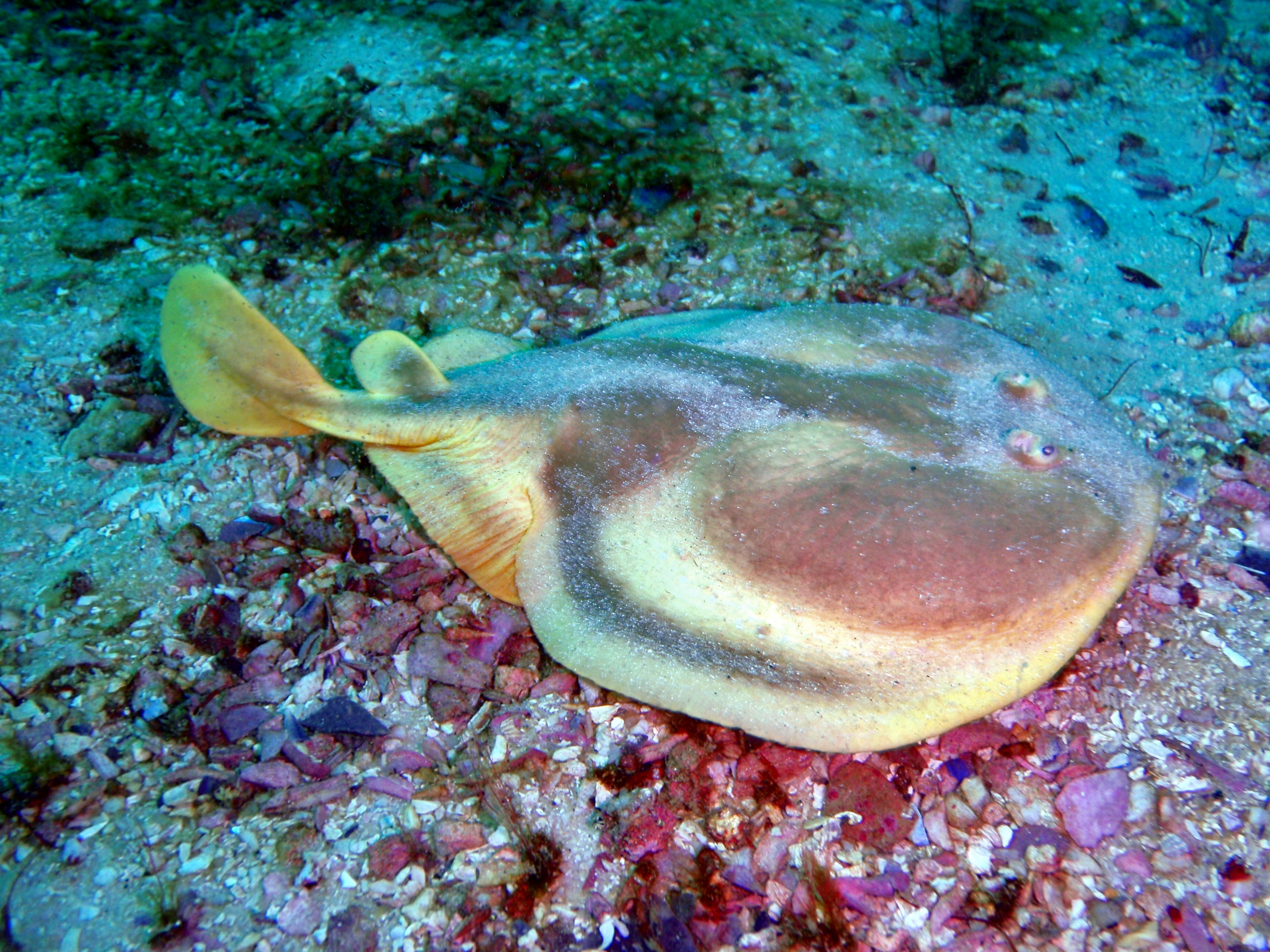

Conservation status
- Least Concern (IUCN 3.1)

Scientific classification
- Kingdom: Animalia
- Phylum: Chordata
- Class: Chondrichthyes
- Subclass: Elasmobranchii
- Order: Torpediniformes
- Family: Narkidae
- Genus: Narke
- Species: N. capensis

Binomial name
- Narke capensis (Gmelin, 1789)
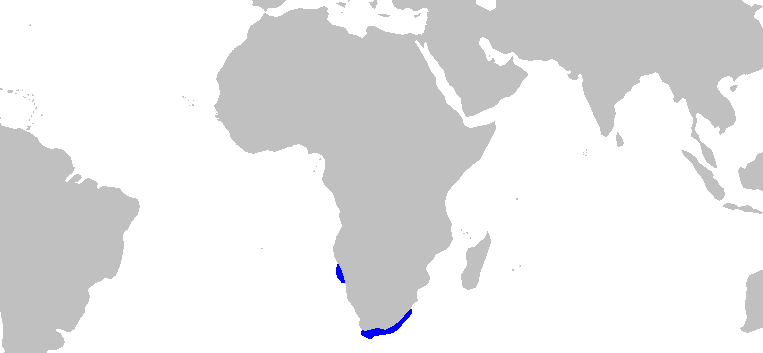
- Range of the onefin electric ray

Synonyms
- Raja capensis Gmelin, 1789

= Onefin electric ray =

Species of cartilaginous fish

The onefin electric ray or Cape numbfish (Narke capensis) is a common but little-known species of electric ray in the family Narkidae, native to South Africa and Namibia. It is a benthic fish found in shallow coastal bays over sandy or muddy bottoms. This small species reaches 38 cm (15 in) in length, and has a nearly circular pectoral fin disc and a short, muscular tail that supports a large caudal fin. It can be identified by its single dorsal fin, which is located over the large pelvic fins. Its dorsal coloration is yellowish to dusky brown.

Like other members of its family, the onefin electric ray can defend itself with a strong electric shock produced from a pair of kidney-shaped electric organs beside its head. It feeds mainly on polychaete worms, and likely gives birth to live young. The International Union for Conservation of Nature (IUCN) presently lacks enough information to assess the conservation status of this species. It is often caught incidentally by bottom trawl fisheries off South Africa, and may also be impacted by pollution from coastal development.

== Taxonomy ==
The onefin electric ray was described by German naturalist Johann Friedrich Gmelin in 1789, in the 13th edition of Systema Naturae. Gmelin's name for the species was printed as Raja capensis in some copies of the book, and as Raja rapensis in others. The original spelling was probably rapensis, which modern taxonomists regard as a typesetting error as the etymology of capensis ("of the Cape [of Good Hope]") is far more reasonable. Later sources have consistently used capensis, though to officially fix the specific epithet under that spelling would require a decision by the International Commission on Zoological Nomenclature (ICZN). Gmelin did not refer to any type specimens. In 1826, German naturalist Johann Jakob Kaup created the new genus Narke for this species, separating it from the other electric rays known at the time on the basis of its curved back and single dorsal fin. Later, more species were assigned to Narke.

== Description ==
The pectoral fin disc of the onefin electric ray is wider than long and almost circular in shape. The two large, kidney-shaped electric organs are visible beneath the skin on either side of the head. The eyes are small and protruding; the larger spiracles lie closely behind and have three small finger-like projections on their rims. The nostrils are placed rather close together, and between them is a long skirt-like flap of skin that reaches the mouth. The small and protrusible mouth is nearly straight and surrounded by prominent furrows. The teeth are tiny and pointed. There are five pairs of small gill slits on the underside of the disc.

The large and broad pelvic fins have convex margins and originate beneath the pectoral fins. Adult males have stubby claspers. There is a single rounded dorsal fin positioned over the pelvic fins. The short and thick tail has a skin fold running along either side and terminates in a large triangular caudal fin with rounded corners, which is almost symmetrical above and below. The soft skin is completely devoid of dermal denticles. This species varies from yellowish brown to dusky brown above; parts of the tail's upper surface are yellowish. The underside is white to yellow with brown fin margins. It grows up to 38 cm (15 in) long and 26 cm (10 in) across, though individuals of this size are rare.

== Distribution and habitat ==
The onefin electric ray is common off the Eastern and Western Cape Provinces of South Africa. Its range extends to central Namibia, with a single specimen recorded from Meob Bay and a second unconfirmed sighting from Walvis Bay. A historical record of this species from Madagascar may be a misidentification. Bottom-dwelling in nature, the onefin electric ray mainly inhabits bays with sandy or muddy bottoms. It is most often found in waters shallower than 50–100 m (160–330 ft), though it has been recorded from as deep as 183 m (600 ft).

== Biology and ecology ==
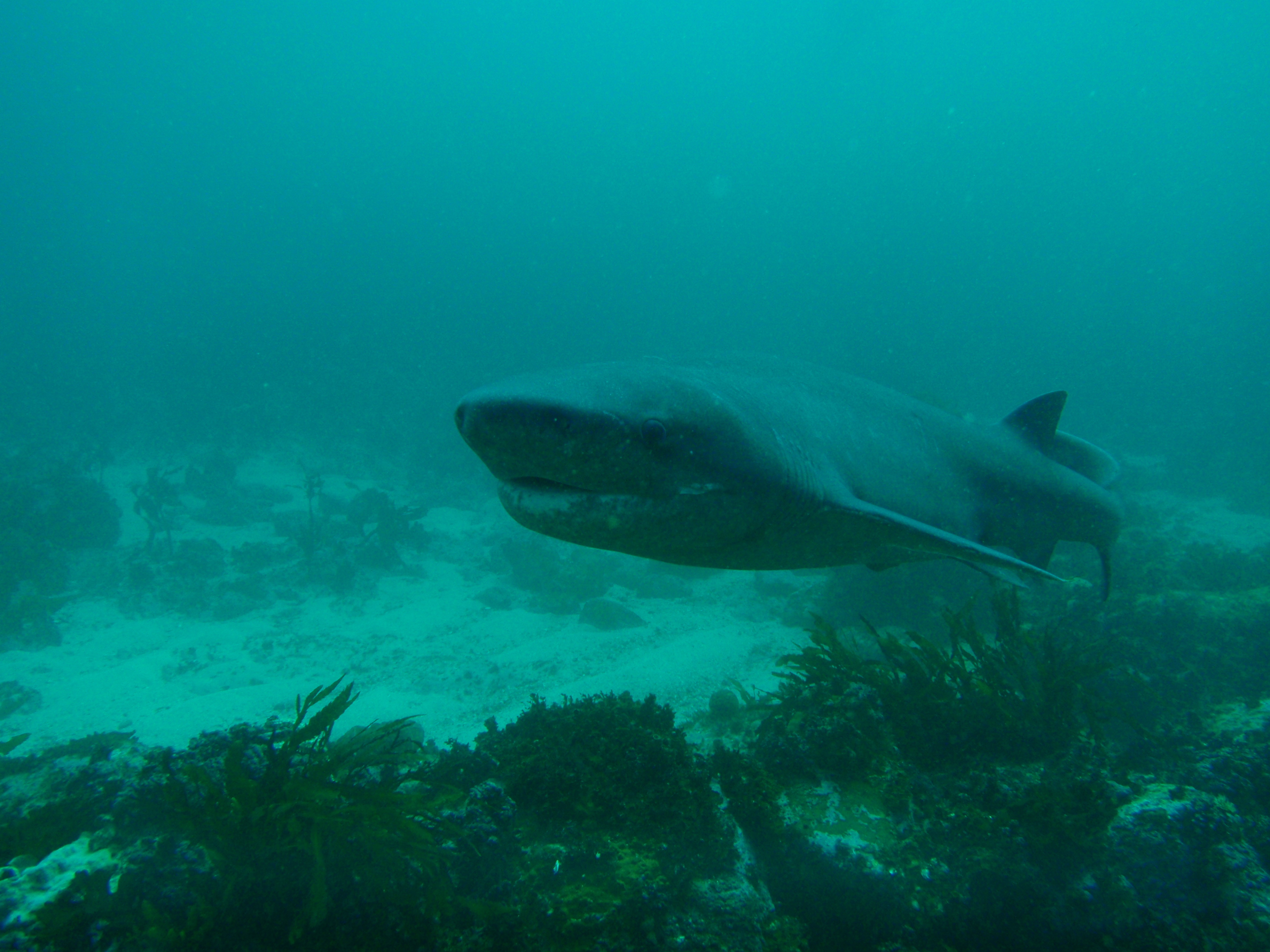
The broadnose sevengill shark preys on the onefin electric ray.

Relative to its small size, the onefin electric ray can deliver an extremely powerful electric shock to defend itself against predators, which include the broadnose sevengill shark (Notorynchus cepedianus). It propels itself using its muscular tail rather than its pectoral fins. The diet of this species consists mainly of polychaete worms. The reproductive biology of the onefin electric ray has not been documented; presumably it is viviparous like other electric rays. Males mature sexually at somewhere between 11 and 17 cm (4.3 and 6.7 in) long, while females mature at around 16 cm (6.3 in) long.

== Human interactions ==
The shock produced by the onefin electric ray can be painful, but is not substantially dangerous to humans. Though not utilized economically, this ray is frequently caught as bycatch in bottom trawls in South African waters. Because of its inshore habits, it may also be negatively affected by water pollution from coastal development.
