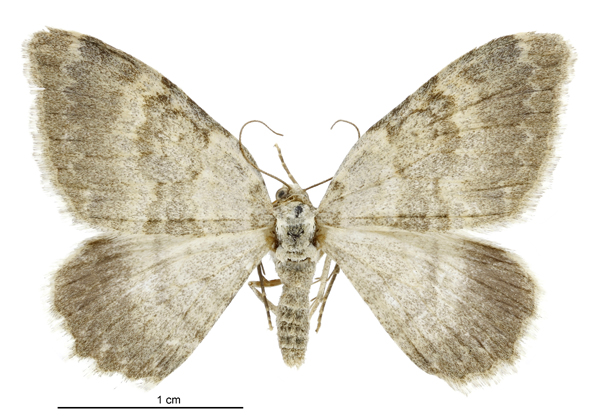
- Female Gingidiobora nebulosa

Scientific classification
- Kingdom: Animalia
- Phylum: Arthropoda
- Class: Insecta
- Order: Lepidoptera
- Family: Geometridae
- Subfamily: Larentiinae
- Genus: Gingidiobora; Craw, 1987

= Gingidiobora =

Genus of moths

Gingidiobora is a genus of moths in the family Geometridae described by Robin C. Craw in 1987. This genus is endemic to New Zealand.

== Species ==
- Gingidiobora nebulosa (Philpott, 1917)
- Gingidiobora subobscurata (Walker, 1862)
