= Sleeper torpedo =

Conservation status
- Data Deficient (IUCN 3.1)

Scientific classification
- Domain: Eukaryota
- Kingdom: Animalia
- Phylum: Chordata
- Class: Chondrichthyes
- Subclass: Elasmobranchii
- Order: Torpediniformes
- Family: Narkidae
- Genus: Crassinarke; Takagi, 1951
- Species: C. dormitor

Binomial name
- Crassinarke dormitor Takagi, 1951

Species of cartilaginous fish

The sleeper torpedo (Crassinarke dormitor) is a species of electric ray in the family Narkidae. It is the only species in the genus Crassinarke. It occurs in relatively shallow water off the coasts of southern Japan, China and Taiwan. It may be the same species as the Japanese sleeper ray (Narke japonica)
