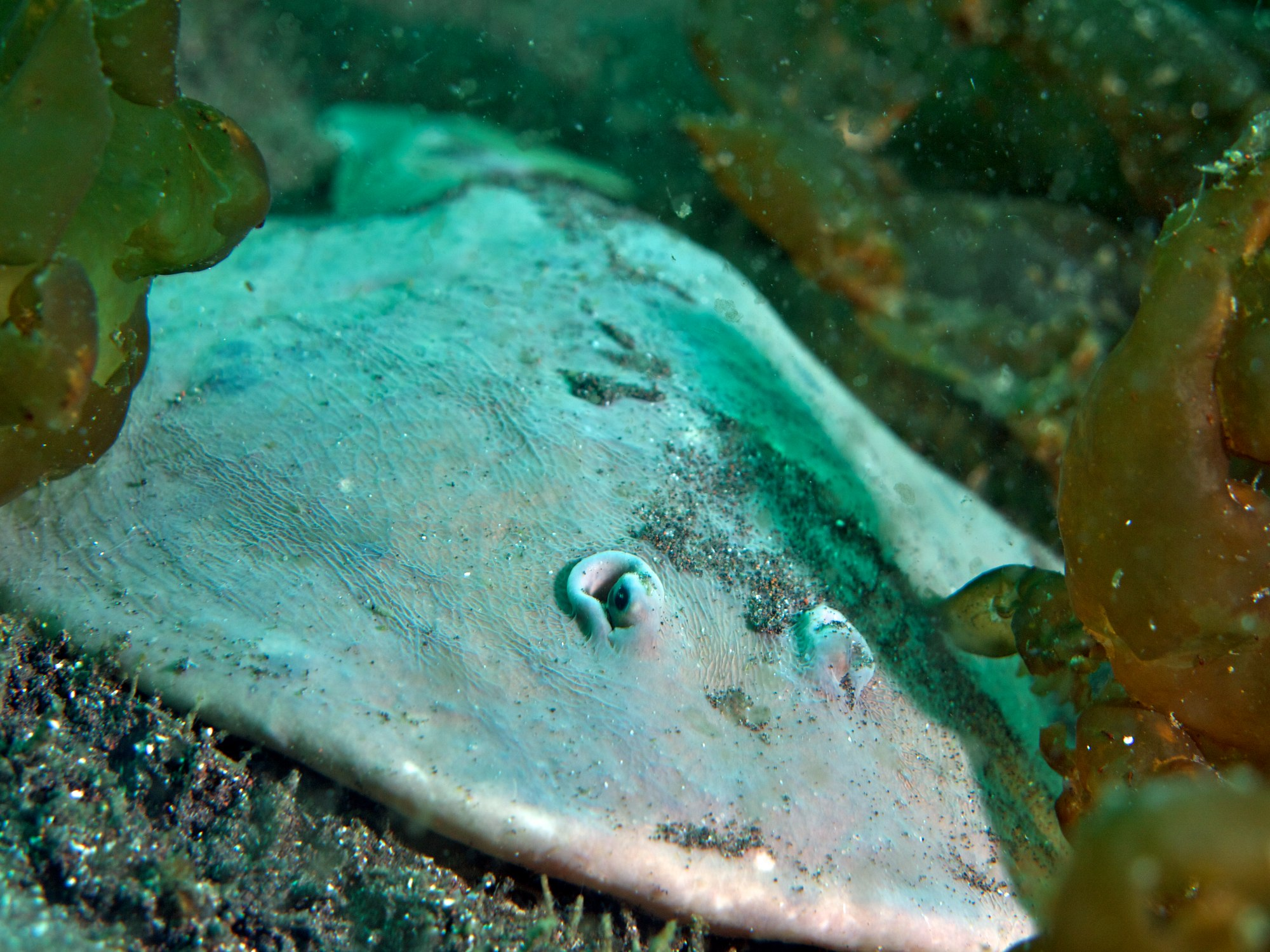

Conservation status
- Vulnerable (IUCN 3.1)

Scientific classification
- Kingdom: Animalia
- Phylum: Chordata
- Class: Chondrichthyes
- Subclass: Elasmobranchii
- Order: Torpediniformes
- Family: Narkidae
- Genus: Narke
- Species: N. japonica

Binomial name
- Narke japonica (Temminck & Schlegel, 1850)
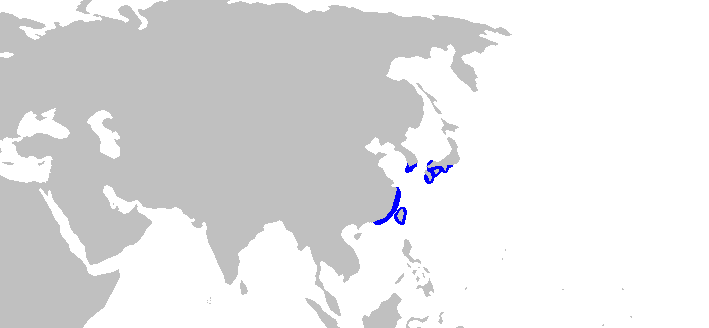
- Geographic range

Synonyms
- Torpedo japonica Temminck & Schlegel, 1850

= Japanese sleeper ray =

Species of cartilaginous fish

The Japanese sleeper ray (Narke japonica) is a species of electric ray in the family Narkidae. It is common in the inshore and offshore waters of the northwestern Pacific Ocean from southern Japan to southern China. Growing up to 40 cm (16 in) long, the Japanese sleeper ray has a nearly circular pectoral fin disc colored reddish to chocolate brown above, sometimes with darker or lighter spots, and lighter brown below. The spiracles behind its small eyes have raised, smooth rims. Its short and muscular tail bears a single dorsal fin positioned aft of the rounded pelvic fins, and terminates in a large caudal fin.

Inhabiting shallow, sandy areas near rocky reefs, the Japanese sleeper ray is a bottom-dwelling predator of invertebrates. Like other members of its family, it can produce a strong electric shock from its electric organs for defensive purposes. Females give live birth to litters of up to five pups. The gestating young are sustained at first by yolk, and later by histotroph ("uterine milk"). The International Union for Conservation of Nature (IUCN) has listed this species as Vulnerable, due to its susceptibility to trawl fisheries that operate intensively throughout its range.

== Taxonomy ==
The first specimens of the Japanese sleeper ray known to science were four fish collected from Japan by German naturalists Philipp Franz von Siebold and Heinrich Burger during the second quarter of the 19th century. The specimens were stuffed and deposited at the National Museum of Natural History in Leiden; three of them were labeled as "Narcine spec." and one as "Narcine timlei". This material formed the basis for a description authored by Coenraad Jacob Temminck and Hermann Schlegel, which was published in 1850 as part of Fauna Japonica, a series of monographs on Japanese zoology. Temminck and Schlegel assigned the new species to the subgenus Astrape of the genus Torpedo; later authors would synonymize Astrape with Narke. In 1947, Marinus Boeseman reexamined the four original specimens and designated the largest, 27 cm (11 in) long, as the species lectotype. Other common names for this ray are Japanese electric ray and Japanese spotted torpedo. Some taxonomists believe that the sleeper torpedo (Crassinarke dormitor) may be conspecific with the Japanese sleeper ray, as their morphology is virtually identical.

== Description ==
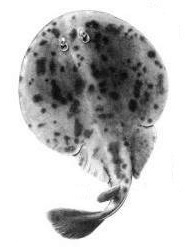
Illustration of a Japanese sleeper ray from the Sagami Sea; this specimen was unusual in having dark spots both above and below.

The Japanese sleeper ray has an almost circular pectoral fin disc wider than long. Two large, kidney-shaped electric organs are visible under the skin on either side of the head. The small, protruding eyes are immediately followed by larger spiracles with prominently raised, smooth rims. The nostrils are small and placed close together, and between them is a curtain of skin that overlaps the mouth. The protrusible mouth forms a short, transverse line and is surrounded by a deep groove. There are fewer than 25 tooth rows in each jaw, arranged into bands; the teeth are small with oval bases and pointed crowns. Five pairs of short gill slits are located on the underside of the disc.

The pelvic fins are large and broad with convex margins, and originate beneath the pectoral fins; adult males have stubby claspers that do not extend past the pelvic fin margins. The tail is short and thick, with a fold of skin along either side. There is a single rounded dorsal fin positioned behind the pelvic fins. The large caudal fin is nearly symmetrical above and below the caudal peduncle and has rounded corners. The skin is soft and lacks dermal denticles. The Japanese sleeper ray is reddish to chocolate brown above and paler brown below; some individuals are plain, while others have dark or light spots over their dorsal (rarely also ventral) surfaces. The maximum known length of this species is 40 cm (16 in).

== Distribution and habitat ==
The Japanese sleeper ray inhabits continental shelf waters in the northwestern Pacific Ocean, from southern Japan and Korea to southeastern China and Taiwan. This common, bottom-dwelling species can be found in sandy areas, often near rocky reefs, both close to and far from shore. Off the Izu Peninsula, it has been reported from 12–23 m (39–75 ft) in depth.

== Biology and ecology ==
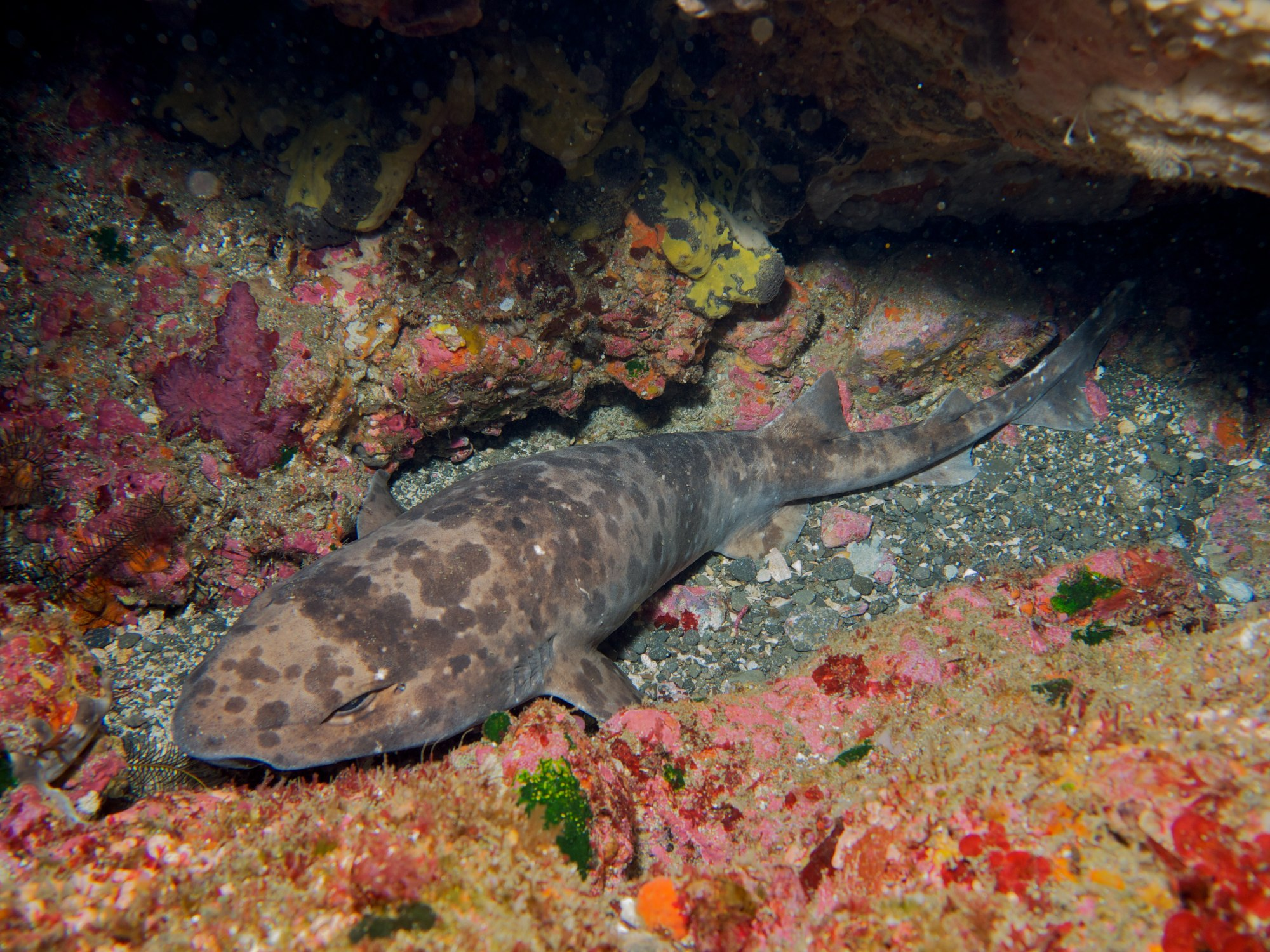
The blotchy swell shark is a predator of the Japanese sleeper ray.

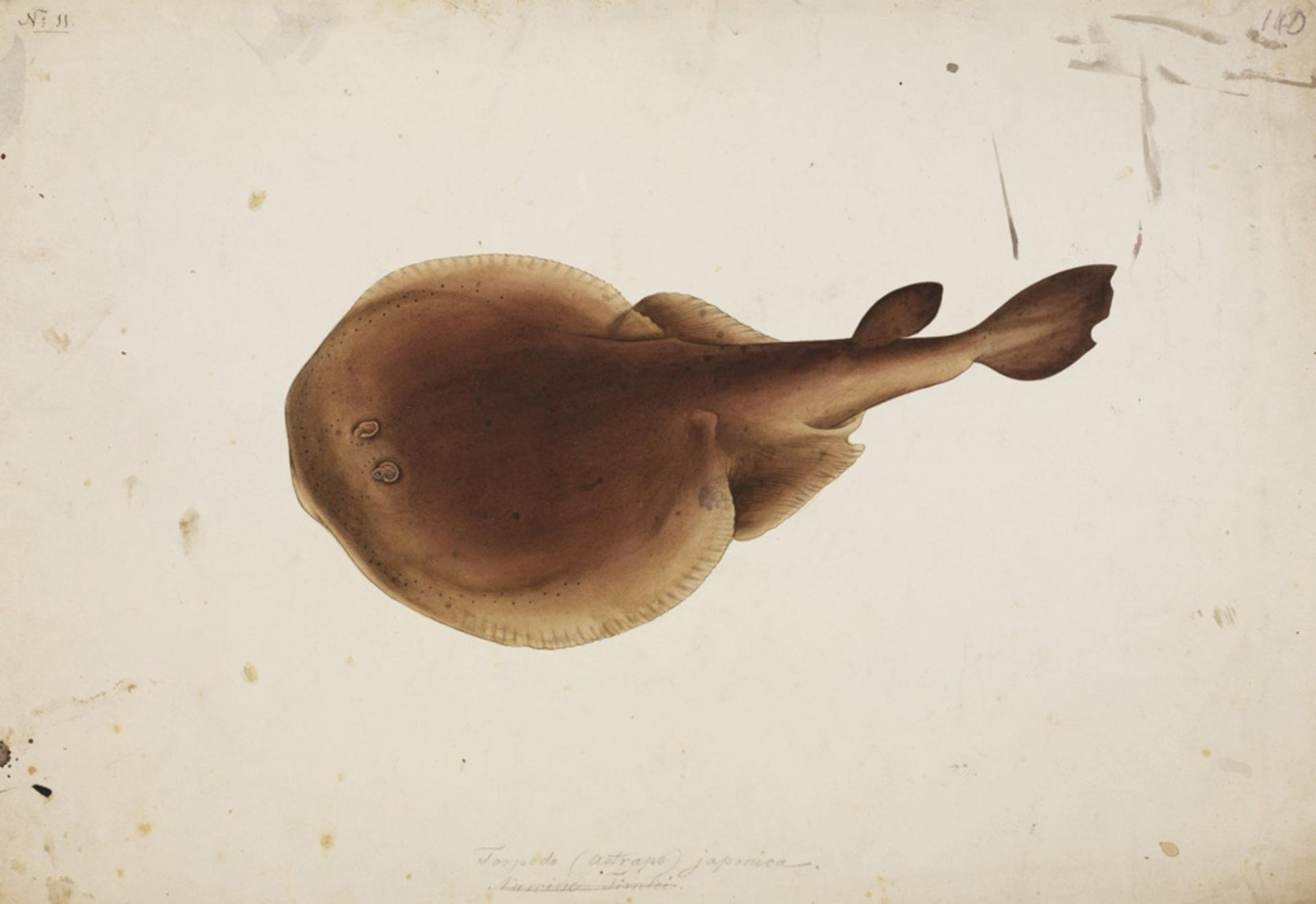
Narke japonica (Temminck and Schlegel) drawn and painted by Kawahara Keiga, 1823 - 1829.

Fairly inactive in nature, the Japanese sleeper ray spends much of its time lying buried on the sea floor. It can produce an electric shock of 30–80 volts to ward off predators, which include the blotchy swell shark (Cephaloscyllium umbratile). Its electric organs are composed of electrocytes, which are specialized cells derived from muscle fibers that are filled with a jelly-like substance. These electrocytes are stacked in vertical columns, with many columns making up each electric organ; this arrangement functions essentially like batteries connected in parallel. The diet of the Japanese sleeper ray includes benthic invertebrates. A parasite of this species is the tapeworm Anteropora japonica (Yamaguti, 1934) Subhapradha, 1955.

The Japanese sleeper ray is viviparous, with the developing embryos nourished initially by yolk and later by histotroph ("uterine milk") produced by the mother. Females bear litters of up to five pups in early summer; the newborns measure 10 cm (3.9 in) long and are lighter and more uniform in color than the adults. Sexual maturity is reached at a length between 23–37 cm (9.1–14.6 in) for males, and at around 35 cm (14 in) for females.

== Human interactions ==
The shock from the Japanese sleeper ray is strong but not life-threatening to humans. There is an observation of a ray that reacted to being touched with a camera by rubbing its back against the camera port, suggesting that it may actively defend itself if disturbed. The Japanese sleeper ray adapts poorly to captivity. This and other species of electric rays are used in biomedical research because their electric organs have an abundance of ion channels and acetylcholine receptors, and can serve as a model for the human nervous system.

Though little specific data are available, the Japanese sleeper ray is believed to be caught incidentally in shrimp trawls and other demersal fishing gear throughout its range. It is not utilized economically; however, electric rays tend not to survive being caught and discarded, and shrimp trawling is known to have caused marked population declines in other electric ray species elsewhere. Given the high intensity of fishing activity off East Asia, the International Union for Conservation of Nature (IUCN) has assessed this species as Vulnerable.
