= Ornate sleeper-ray =

Conservation status
- Least Concern (IUCN 3.1)

Scientific classification
- Kingdom: Animalia
- Phylum: Chordata
- Class: Chondrichthyes
- Subclass: Elasmobranchii
- Order: Torpediniformes
- Family: Narkidae
- Genus: Electrolux; Compagno & Heemstra, 2007
- Species: E. addisoni

Binomial name
- Electrolux addisoni Compagno & Heemstra, 2007

Species of cartilaginous fish

The ornate sleeper-ray (Electrolux addisoni) is a species of electric ray in the family Narkidae, and the only member of the genus Electrolux. It lives on reefs feeding on polychaete worms and small crustaceans, it has only been seen by divers to feed during the daytime. It is endemic to the coast of South Africa. It was first recorded in 1984 but was not described until 2007. It was ranked as the number one newly described species of 2007 by the International Institute for Species Exploration.

In an episode of Extinct or Alive, an ornate-sleeper ray was caught on footage feeding.

== Description ==
Electrolux addisoni is easily distinguished from other narkids by its striking colour pattern consisting of a dark brown dorsal surface of the disc with numerous small pale yellow spots and a series of concentric stripes. It can also be distinguished by its large spiracular papillae. It and Heteronarce are the only genera in the family Narkidae that have two dorsal fins. The conspicuous colour pattern of the species may act as a warning signal to other animals, when closely approached the ray has been seen to make a possible threat display. The holotype pictured weighed 1.8 kg and had a total length of 515 mm. This makes it one of the largest species of Narkidae recorded, although no female specimens have been collected and measured.

== Distribution ==
Electrolux addisoni has been recorded in four locations along a 300 km strip of coastline from Coffee Bay, Eastern Cape Province, to just north of Durban, KwaZulu-Natal in water less than 50 m deep.

== Discovery ==
Despite being first photographed in 1984 by Peter Chrystal on Aliwal Shoal, KwaZulu-Natal the species evaded capture (and therefore classification) until 2007. Experts immediately realised that this was a new species but were unsure to which order it belonged. It was filmed by nature film producers Stephania and Peter Lamberti off Shelly Beach, KwaZulu-Natal in 1997 and they sent this clip to Phil Heemstra. Heemstra sighted a live specimen in 2001 but unfortunately could not capture it. Mark Addison finally managed to capture a live specimen in September 2003 and he donated this to the South African Institute of Aquatic Biodiversity. Another specimen was collected by Mark's father, Brent Addison, and this specimen is held in the fish collection of the South African Museum. Examination of the specimens confirmed that it was a new species and that it was also of a new genus.

== Conservation ==
Its habitat is intensively used for recreational diving, commercial fishing and there is increasing development along the coastline which means that it may be at risk from pollution, habitat degradation and from being disturbed by divers. The describing authors tentatively suggest that it may possibly be critically endangered but conclude that more observations need to be made before its conservation status can be properly assessed.

== Etymology ==
The species was named after the Electrolux vacuum cleaner company. The name alludes to the well-developed electrogenic properties of this ray and to the "vigorous sucking action displayed on the videotape of the feeding ray that...may rival a well-known electrical device used to suck the detritus from carpets, furniture, and other dust-gathering surfaces in modern home." The species is named after Mark Addison, who collected the holotype.
