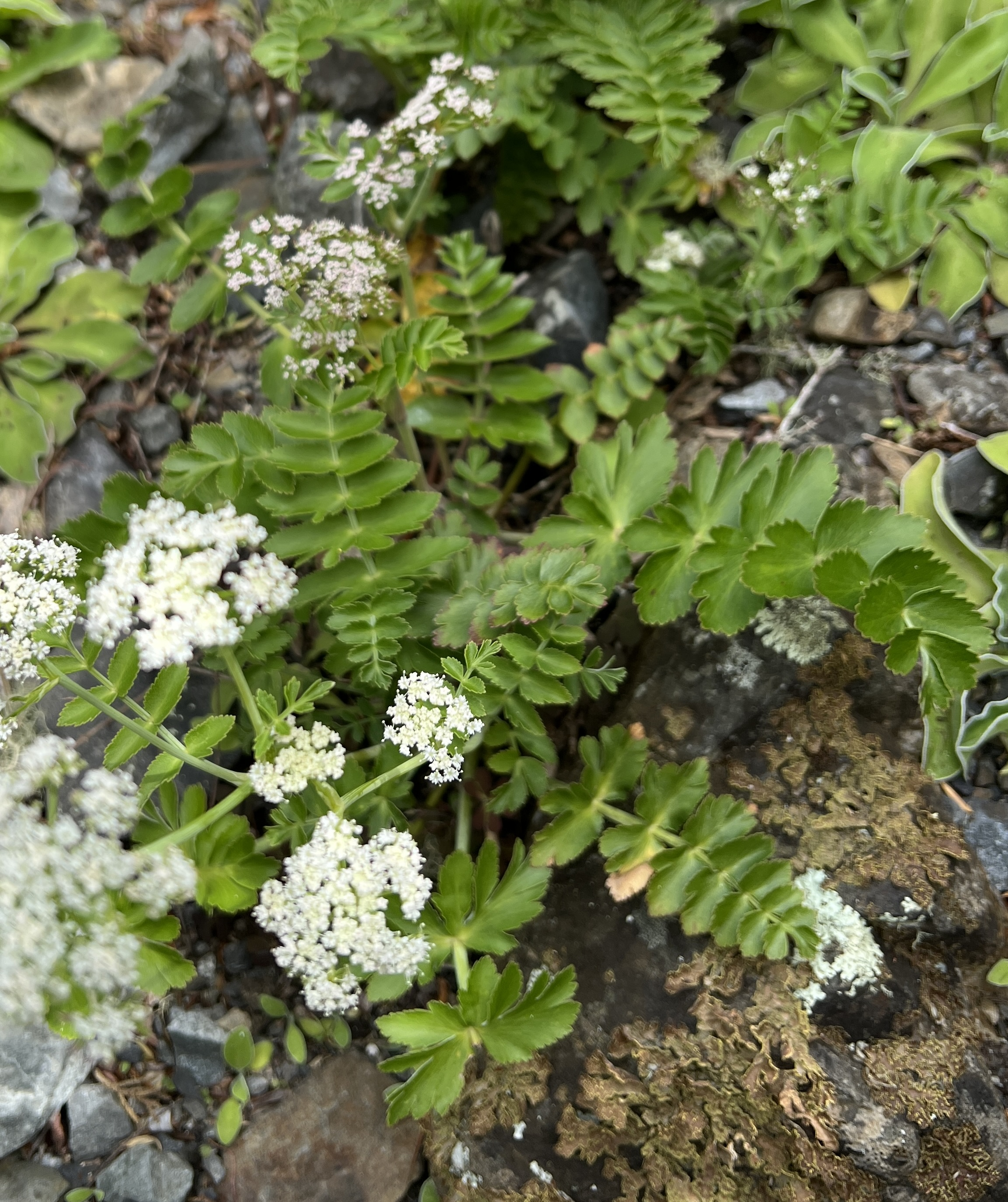
- Gingidia montana at Otari-Wilton's Bush

Scientific classification
- Kingdom: Plantae
- Clade: Tracheophytes
- Clade: Angiosperms
- Clade: Eudicots
- Clade: Asterids
- Order: Apiales
- Family: Apiaceae
- Subfamily: Apioideae
- Tribe: Aciphylleae
- Genus: Gingidia; J.W.Dawson

= Gingidia =

Genus of plants

Gingidia is a genus of flowering plants belonging to the family Apiaceae.

Its native range is Southeastern Australia, New Zealand.

Species:

- Gingidia algens (F.Muell.) J.W.Dawson
- Gingidia amphistoma Heenan
- Gingidia baxteri (J.W.Dawson) C.J.Webb
- Gingidia decipiens (Hook.f.) J.W.Dawson
- Gingidia enysii (Kirk) J.W.Dawson
- Gingidia flabellata (Kirk) J.W.Dawson
- Gingidia grisea Heenan
- Gingidia haematitica Heenan
- Gingidia harveyana (F.Muell.) J.W.Dawson
- Gingidia montana (J.R.Forst. & G.Forst.) J.W.Dawson
- Gingidia rupicola I.Telford & J.J.Bruhl
- Gingidia trifoliolata (Hook.f.) J.W.Dawson
