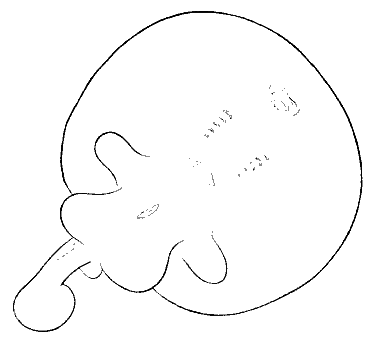
- Blind electric ray (T. aysoni)

Scientific classification
- Kingdom: Animalia
- Phylum: Chordata
- Class: Chondrichthyes
- Subclass: Elasmobranchii
- Order: Torpediniformes
- Family: Narkidae
- Genus: Typhlonarke; Waite, 1909

Type species
- Astrape aysoni A. Hamilton, 1902

= Typhlonarke =

Genus of cartilaginous fishes

Typhlonarke is a genus of sleeper ray in the family Narkidae, containing two poorly known species. The group is known for producing electric shocks for defense. Both species are deep-sea rays endemic to the waters off New Zealand. They are not to be confused with the blind electric rays of the genus Benthobatis.

== Taxonomy ==
Typhlonarke was created by Edgar R. Waite, in a 1909 issue of the scientific journal Records of the Canterbury Museum.

== Species ==
- Typhlonarke aysoni A. Hamilton, 1902 (Blind electric ray)
- Typhlonarke tarakea Phillipps, 1929 (Oval electric ray)

== Distribution and habitat ==
Both Typhlonarke species are native to New Zealand; the exact distribution of each species is uncertain due to confusion between the two. They have been caught by trawls off the east coast of North Island south of East Cape, South Island, Stewart Island / Rakiura, Chatham Rise (Mernoo Bank and Chatham Islands), and the Snares Shelf. They occur at a depth of 46–800 meters, but most are found between 300 and 400 meters.

== Description ==
The blind electric rays are small, flat cartilaginous fish with the round pectoral fin disc characteristic of electric rays, a short, fleshy tail, and one dorsal fin. The front part of their pelvic fins are modified for walking, while the back is fused to the disk. Their eyes are not visible externally and are practically useless, hence the name. The coloration is dark brown above and lighter below. T. aysoni grows to a maximum length of 38 cm and T. tarakea to 35 cm.

== Biology and ecology ==
The flabby disc and rudimentary tail of the blind electric rays suggest that they are poor swimmers. Instead, examination of their anatomy suggests that they may push themselves along the bottom using the modified forward lobes of their pelvic fins, called "crurae". These structures have also evolved independently in other benthic rays, including species of Raja, Cruriraja and Anacanthobatis, and are believed to be an adaptation for feeding on invertebrates in the substrate. The diet of Typhlonarke includes polychaete worms. Reproduction is likely ovoviviparous, as with the other species in the family, with litters of up to 11 pups. The young measure 9–10 cm at birth.

== Human interactions ==
The IUCN Red List assesses both species as Data Deficient (DD); although they are apparently rare, confusion between the two species has made their distribution and population status uncertain. As they are benthic fishes, blind electric rays are potentially vulnerable to bottom trawling as their range coincides with major commercial trawling fisheries. No current conservation measures are in place for the genus.
