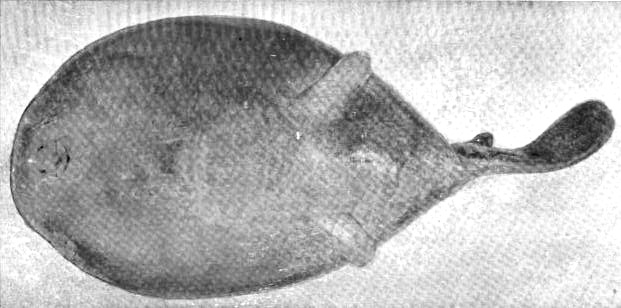

Conservation status
- Data Deficient (IUCN 3.1)

Scientific classification
- Kingdom: Animalia
- Phylum: Chordata
- Class: Chondrichthyes
- Subclass: Elasmobranchii
- Order: Torpediniformes
- Family: Narkidae
- Genus: Typhlonarke
- Species: T. tarakea

Binomial name
- Typhlonarke tarakea Phillipps, 1929

= Oval electric ray =

Species of cartilaginous fish

The oval electric ray (Typhlonarke tarakea) is a little-known species of sleeper ray in the family Narkidae. It is endemic to New Zealand, where it is generally found on the sea floor at a depth of 300–400 m (980–1,310 ft). Seldom exceeding 30 cm (12 in) in length, this species has a thick, oval pectoral fin disc and a short, stout tail with a single dorsal fin. It is blind, as its tiny eyes are covered by skin. Its pelvic fins are divided in two, with the anterior portion forming a limb-like appendage. These appendages likely allow the ray, which may not be able to swim at all, to "walk" along the bottom. The claspers of adult males extend beyond the disc. Polychaete worms are known to be part of its diet, and its reproduction is aplacental viviparous. It can produce an electric shock for defense. The International Union for Conservation of Nature presently lacks the data to assess its conservation status.

== Taxonomy ==
The oval electric ray was described by William John Phillipps of the Dominion Museum, in a 1929 volume of the New Zealand Journal of Science and Technology. The type specimen was collected off Island Bay, Wellington. A specimen of this ray had been illustrated earlier by Augustus Hamilton, in his 1909 description of the related T. aysoni. Hamilton obtained the specimen at the fish market at Dunedin and made note of its different shape, but did not recognize it as a distinct species.

The IUCN Red List considers Typhlonarke tarakea a poorly preserved specimen of the blind electric ray (Typhlonarke aysoni), which is given a conservation status of Least Concern. However, other authorities recognise the two species.

== Distribution and habitat ==
Confusion between the two Typhlonarke species has led to uncertainty regarding the extent of the oval electric ray's distribution. Both species are found off the eastern coast of New Zealand, between the East Cape of North Island and the Snares Shelf south of South Island, including the Cook and Foveaux Straits and the Stewart and Chatham Islands. Bottom-dwelling in nature, this species is generally found at a depth of 300–400 m (980–1,310 ft) but has been recorded from as shallow as 46 m (151 ft) and as deep as 800 m (2,600 ft).

== Description ==
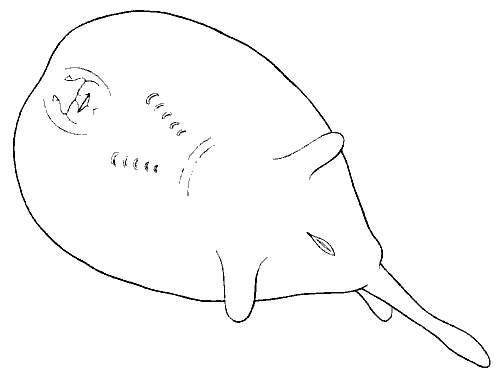
The oval electric ray differs in disc shape from the related T. aysoni.

The pectoral fin disc of the oval electric ray is ovoid in shape, tapering smoothly towards the rear, and has a very thick margin. The eyes are minute and located 2–3 mm (0.079–0.118 in) beneath the surface of the skin; though not visible externally, their positions are marked by small white patches. The spiracles follow the eyes and are oval with smooth rims. The nostrils are closely together, with their outer rims curled to nearly form tubes and their inner rims expanded and fused together into a fleshy skirt-shaped curtain, that nearly conceals the small, deeply recessed mouth. The teeth number 11 rows in either jaw and are arranged with a quincunx pattern to form narrow plates restricted to the front of the jaws. The teeth in the back have a single sharp cusp, while those at the front are worn down and blunt. There are five pairs of short, curved gill slits, with the first and fifth pairs smaller than the others.

Each pelvic fin is divided: the anterior portion is formed into a long appendage resembling a finger, while the posterior portion is merged smoothly with the pectoral fin to form part of the disc. The trailing margins of the pelvic fins join the body evenly, without a notch. Adult males have cylindrical claspers that extend past the disc margin. The single dorsal fin has a rounded margin and originates just ahead of where the disc margin meets the body. The tail is short and thick, with faint lateral skin folds running along the sides, and ends in a nearly circular caudal fin. The skin is completely smooth. The oval electric ray is dark brown above, lightening towards the disc margins and on the underside. The area around the mouth and nostrils, and the underside of the pelvic appendages, are white. This species can grow to 36 cm (14 in) long, but most do not exceed 30 cm (12 in).

== Biology and ecology ==
Thick and flabby with a rudimentary tail, the oval electric ray seems virtually incapable of swimming. Instead, it likely relies on its mobile pelvic fin appendages, which are better developed than those of T. aysoni, to push it along the bottom. Like other electric rays, it can produce a defensive electric shock from a pair of kidney-shaped electric organs placed on either side of its head. Each organ consists of 180–200 relatively large, fluid-filled hexagonal columns, which essentially act as batteries connected in parallel. The oval electric ray is sightless and captures prey via suction; it is known to feed on polychaete worms. It is aplacental viviparous, with females bearing litters of up to 11 pups. The newborns measure 9–10 cm (3.5–3.9 in) long.

== Human interactions ==
The oval electric ray is susceptible to capture in bottom trawls, and the presence of major commercial fishing activity within its range may merit concern. However, given insufficient data the International Union for Conservation of Nature (IUCN) has listed it under Data Deficient. In June 2018 the New Zealand Department of Conservation classified the oval electric ray as "Not Threatened" with the qualifier "Data Poor" under the New Zealand Threat Classification System.
