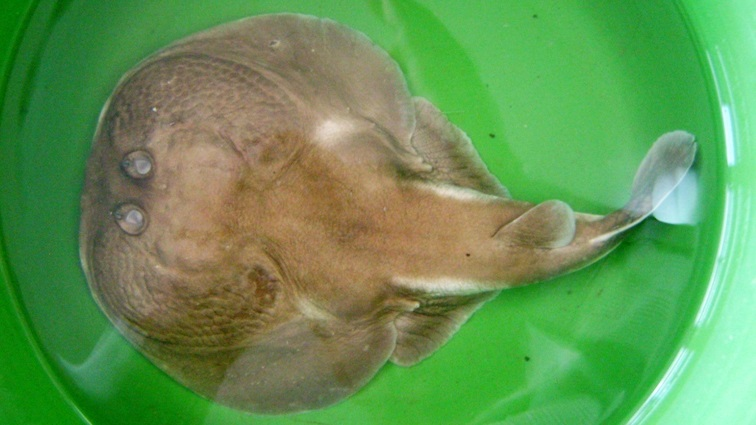

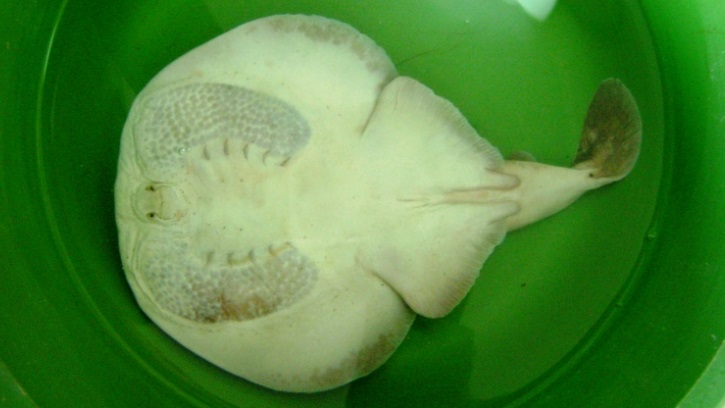

Conservation status
- Vulnerable (IUCN 3.1)

Scientific classification
- Kingdom: Animalia
- Phylum: Chordata
- Class: Chondrichthyes
- Subclass: Elasmobranchii
- Order: Torpediniformes
- Family: Narkidae
- Genus: Narke
- Species: N. dipterygia

Binomial name
- Narke dipterygia (Bloch & Schneider, 1801)
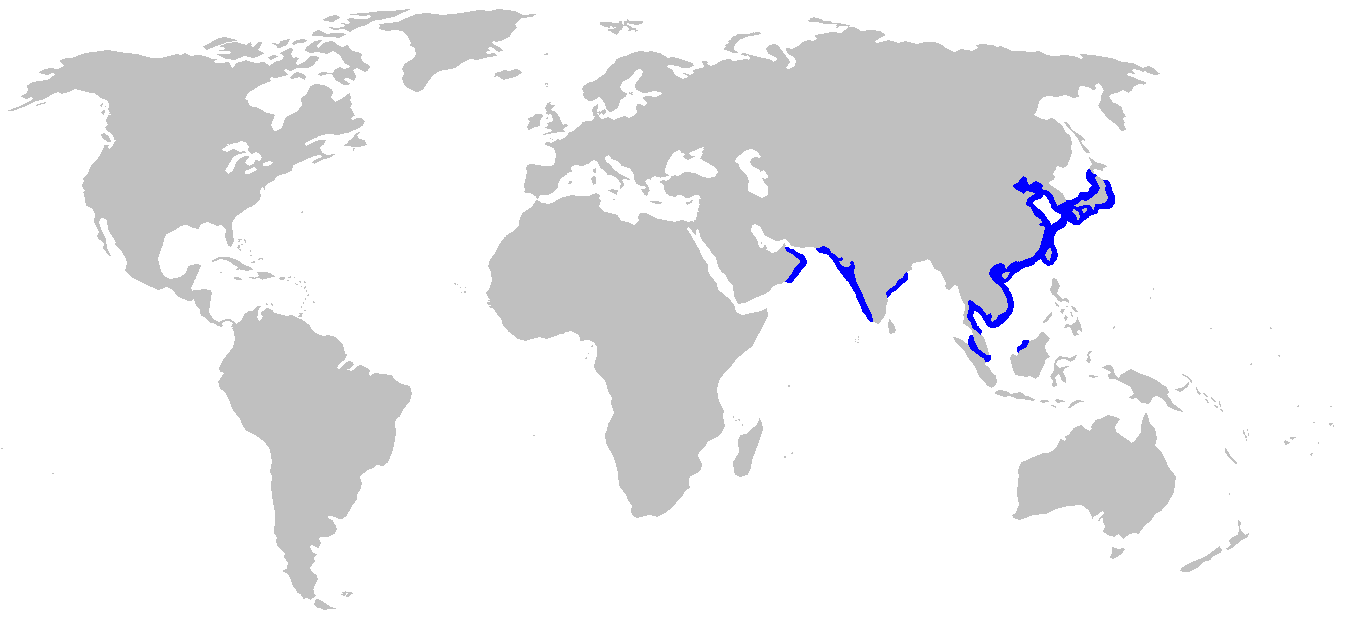
- Geographic range

Synonyms
- Raja dipterygia Bloch & Schneider, 1801

= Numbray =

Species of cartilaginous fish

The numbray or spottail sleeper ray (Narke dipterygia) is a species of electric ray in the family Narkidae. It may be found in shallow muddy estuaries or offshore depths. It is a weak swimmer that lies on the bottom, commonly buried. It eats small marine invertebrates and fish. It pounces on its prey and wraps its body around its prey, killing or stunning it with electrical shocks. It has been observed that Numbrays are not as common as other types of rays in the area around the Indian Ocean. This can be attributed to the relatively large doubling time for a population, reaching up to 18 years.
