= Heteronarce =

Scientific classification
- Kingdom: Animalia
- Phylum: Chordata
- Class: Chondrichthyes
- Subclass: Elasmobranchii
- Order: Torpediniformes
- Family: Narkidae
- Genus: Heteronarce; Regan, 1921

Genus of cartilaginous fishes

Heteronarce is a genus of sleeper rays in the family Narkidae. This genus is found only in the western Indian Ocean along the coasts of Africa, the Arabian Peninsula and India.

== Species ==
There are currently four recognized species in this genus:

- Heteronarce bentuviai Baranes & J. E. Randall, 1989 (Eilat electric ray)
- Heteronarce garmani Regan, 1921 (Natal electric ray)
- Heteronarce mollis Lloyd, 1907 (Soft electric ray)
- Heteronarce prabhui Talwar, 1981 (Quilon electric ray)
