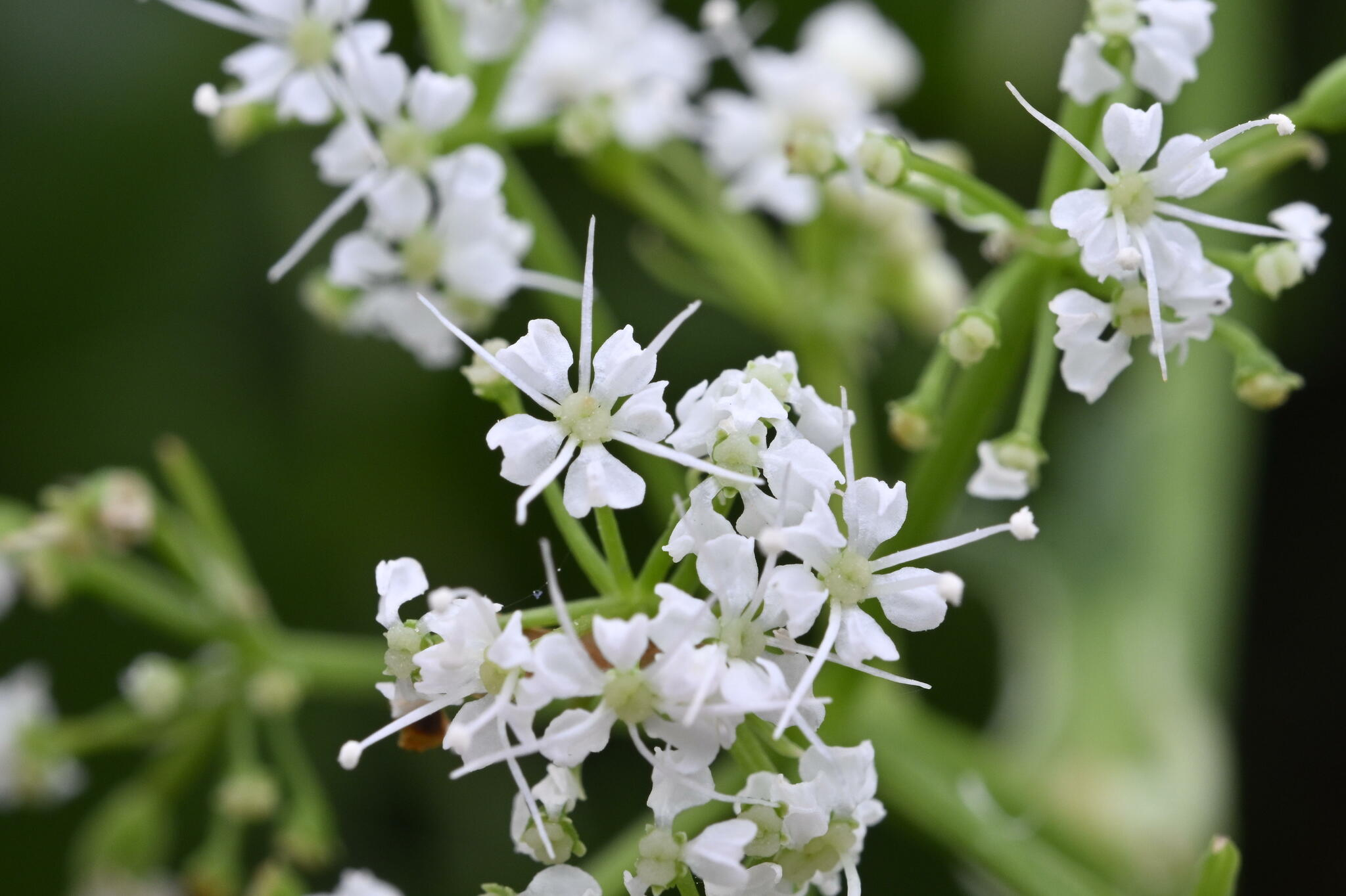
- Gingidia montana in Southland

Conservation status
- Declining (NZ TCS)

Scientific classification
- Kingdom: Plantae
- Clade: Tracheophytes
- Clade: Angiosperms
- Clade: Eudicots
- Clade: Asterids
- Order: Apiales
- Family: Apiaceae
- Genus: Gingidia
- Species: G. montana

Binomial name
- Gingidia montana (J.R.Forst. & G.Forst.) J.W.Dawson

= Gingidia montana =

Species of flowering plant

Gingidia montana, or mountain aniseed, New Zealand aniseed, koheriki, Māori anise, native angelica, or naupiro, is a species of flowering plant,endemic to New Zealand. It used to exist across the North and South Islands, but is now quite rare in the North Island due to heavy grazing by introduced herbivores.

== Description ==
The leaves are green, gray underneath, and has 5-10 opposite leaflets. The stout habit and large leaves and leaflets distinguish it from Gingidia grisea, and by the lanceolate secondary bracts (as opposed to broad-elliptic or long-acuminate).

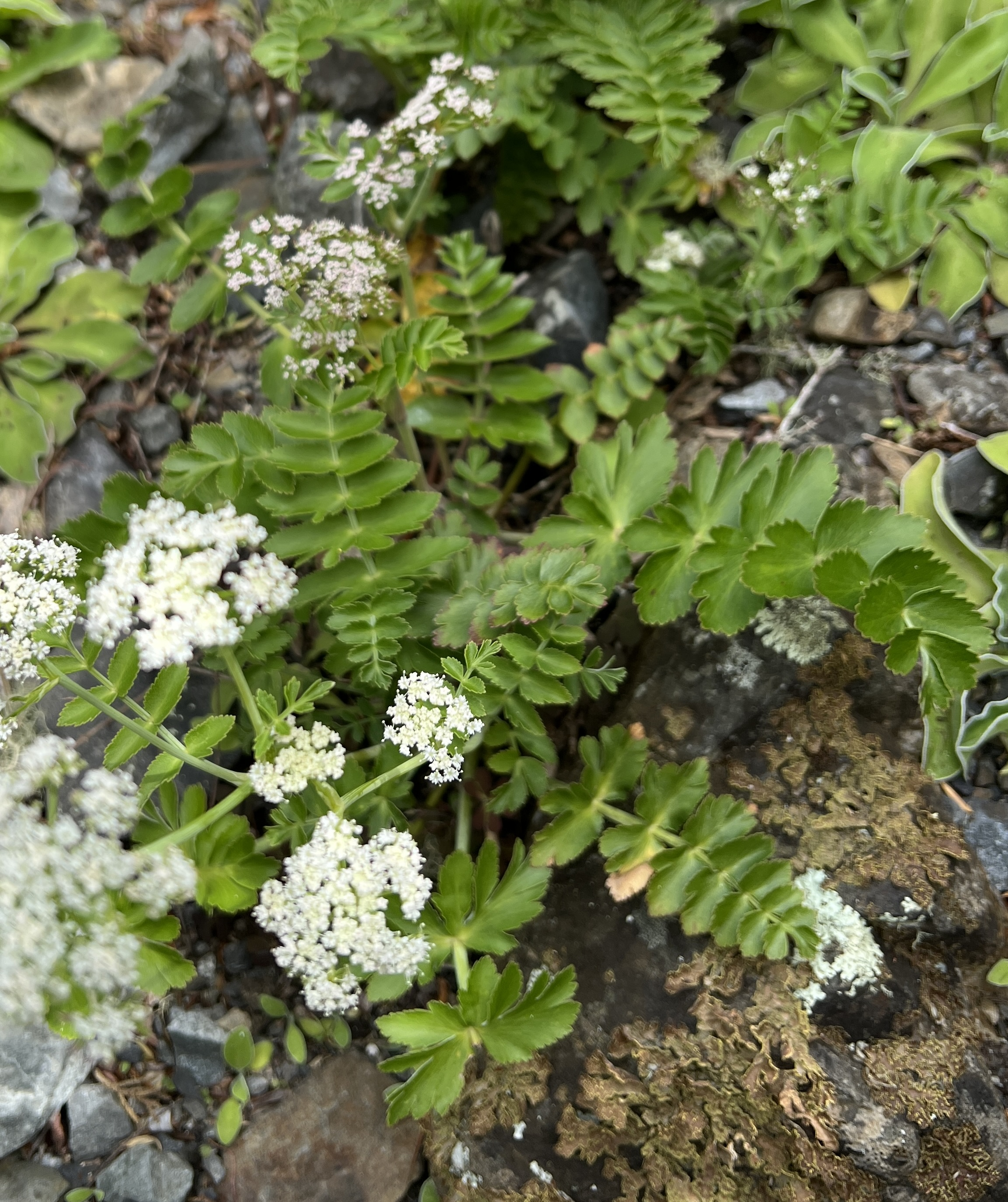
The leaves and flowers of G. montana

== Range and habitat ==
Found in both the North and South Island of New Zealand. It occurs from the sea to the subalpine biome, and prefers open grassland and riparian areas, although it is now mainly seen on rocky slopes in the North Island where it is safe from browsing. The species was recently downgraded to Declining status, in part due to its fragmented range.

== Taxonomy ==
Gingidia is related to Aciphylla, and the relationship remains unresolved. G. montana was only split out from three other species in Australia and New Zealand in 2013, and from G. grisea in 2004.
