= Augustus Hamilton =

New Zealand ethnologist, biologist and museum director (1853–1913)

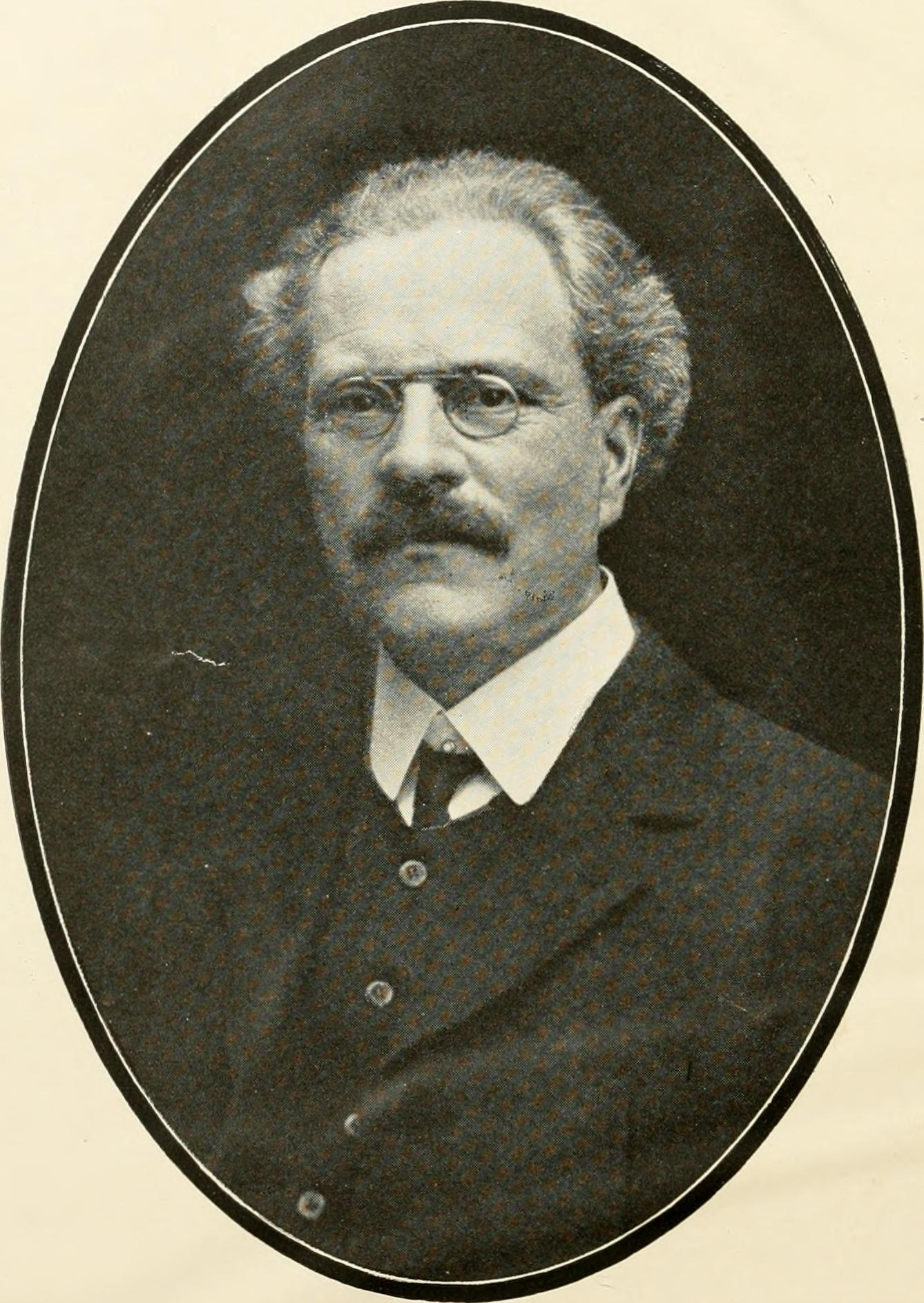
Portrait of Augustus Hamilton (1913)

Augustus Hamilton (1 March 1853 – 12 October 1913) was a New Zealand ethnologist, biologist and museum director. He was born in Poole, Dorset, England on 1 March 1853. He wrote on the fishing and seafoods of the ancient Māori people. He also wrote on the art and workmanship of the Māori in New Zealand with a series of illustrations (from photographs).

Hamilton became the second director of the Colonial Museum in Wellington, following James Hector, in 1903. He was one of the principal ethnologists in New Zealand at the time; he helped develop the Māori Antiquities Act in 1901 and was the main proponent for building a National Māori Museum. Hamilton was President of the Royal Society of New Zealand between 1909 and 1911; preceded by G. M. Thomson and followed by Thomas Frederic Cheeseman.

Hamilton's scientific specimens and other collection items are at Te Papa and other New Zealand institutions.

== Family life ==
Hamilton married Hope Ellen McKain in Napier on 22 September 1882. He had a daughter, Pearl, and a son, Harold who served as a biologist in the Australasian Antarctic Expedition (1911-14).

Hamilton died suddenly and prematurely in Russell, Bay of Islands, New Zealand in 1913.
