= Frederic Wayne King =

American herpetologist (1936–2022)

F. Wayne King
- Born: Frederic Wayne King; May 20, 1936; West Palm Beach, Florida, U.S.
- Died: November 7, 2022 (aged 86); Gainesville, Florida, U.S.
- Education: University of Florida (B.Sc., M.Sc.); University of Miami (Ph.D.)
- Known for: Research on reptiles, especially lizards and crocodiles
- Scientific career
- Fields: Herpetology, Conservation biology
- Workplaces: University of Florida, Florida Museum of Natural History
- Thesis: Competition between two South Florida Lizards of the Genus Anolis (1968)

Frederic Wayne King (May 20, 1936 – November 7, 2022), usually cited as F. Wayne King, was an American herpetologist, conservationist, university professor, and museum director. He specialized in the study and conservation of reptiles, particularly lizards and crocodiles.

== Life ==
King was the son of Frederic Worthington and Vera Hilda King (née Ashburner). He earned a Bachelor of Science degree in 1957 and a Master of Science degree in 1961 from the University of Florida. In 1965 he married Sharon Ray Frances Ryther, with whom he had one son. In 1968 he received his Ph.D. from the University of Miami with the dissertation Competition between two South Florida Lizards of the Genus Anolis.

His early research focused on the systematics and ecology of lizards in the Caribbean and Southeast Asia. From 1962 to 1963 he conducted fieldwork in Sarawak, collecting reptiles and amphibians, and worked closely with the local Iban people. From 1966 to 1967 he was a research associate at the Florida State Museum in Gainesville.

In 1967 he joined the New York Zoological Society (now the Wildlife Conservation Society), where he became chair of the education program (1971–1973), later serving as associate curator and then curator of herpetology, and from 1975 to 1979 as director of conservation, environmental education, and zoological conservation. From 1972 to 1979 he was a scientific advisor and editorial board member of the International Zoo Yearbook.

From 1973 to 1979, and again from 1981 to 1990, King chaired the IUCN Crocodile Specialist Group (CSG). From 1979 to 1997 he was curator of reptiles and director of the Florida Museum of Natural History, and until his retirement in 2007 he held a professorship in zoology, wildlife, and Latin American studies at the University of Florida. His major publications include Identification of Commercial Crocodile Skins (1971, with Peter Brazaitis), The Audubon Guide to North American Reptiles and Amphibians (1979, with John Behler), and Crocodilians, Tuataras and Turtle Species of the World (1989, with Russel Burke).

During the 1980s and 1990s, King participated in crocodile field research and surveys in Venezuela, Guyana, Colombia, Nicaragua, the Solomon Islands, and Palau. His most significant influence, however, was in conservation policy and its international implementation.

Initially, King argued that commercial exploitation was the primary cause of crocodile declines and should be stopped. Later, influenced by colleagues such as Harry Messel, Grahame Webb, and John Hutton, he supported regulated, sustainable use. He advised U.S. authorities, the CITES, and programs in Colombia, Paraguay, and Nicaragua on management, trade regulation, and monitoring. He also maintained ties with the U.S. reptile leather industry.

King played a central role in founding the Crocodile Specialist Group in 1971 and hosted its first meeting at the New York Zoological Society. The conservation status assessments discussed there became the basis for the IUCN Red List. He was part of the U.S. delegation to the Washington, D.C. conference that drafted the CITES agreement.

King described several reptile taxa, including Cyrtodactylus cavernicolus, Sphaerodactylus parvus, Xenosaurus agrenon, and Xenosaurus platyceps.

== Memberships and awards ==
King was a member of numerous organizations, including the Herpetologists’ League, the American Society of Ichthyologists and Herpetologists (board member 1975–1977, 1979–1983; chair of the Environmental Quality Committee 1973–1975), the American Alliance of Museums, the International Council of Museums, the Society for the Study of Amphibians and Reptiles, and the Association of Zoos and Aquariums (chair of the Wildlife Conservation Committee 1972–1974). He also held leadership roles in the IUCN, the Association of Systematics Collections, the U.S. National Committee of the IUCN, the Sea Turtle Conservancy, and the Sierra Club, among others.

In 1975 King received the American Motors Corporation Conservation Award. In 1981 he was awarded the Order of the Golden Ark by Prince Bernhard of the Netherlands.

== Selected bibliography ==
- Identification of Commercial Crocodile Skins (1971, with Peter Brazaitis)
- The Audubon Guide to North American Reptiles and Amphibians (1979, with John Behler)
- Crocodilians, Tuataras and Turtle Species of the World (1989, with Russel Burke)
