= Xenosaurus penai =

Conservation status
- Least Concern (IUCN 3.1)

Scientific classification
- Kingdom: Animalia
- Phylum: Chordata
- Class: Reptilia
- Order: Squamata
- Suborder: Anguimorpha
- Family: Xenosauridae
- Genus: Xenosaurus
- Species: X. penai

Binomial name
- Xenosaurus penai Pérez Ramos, L. de la Riva & Campbell, 2000

Species of lizard

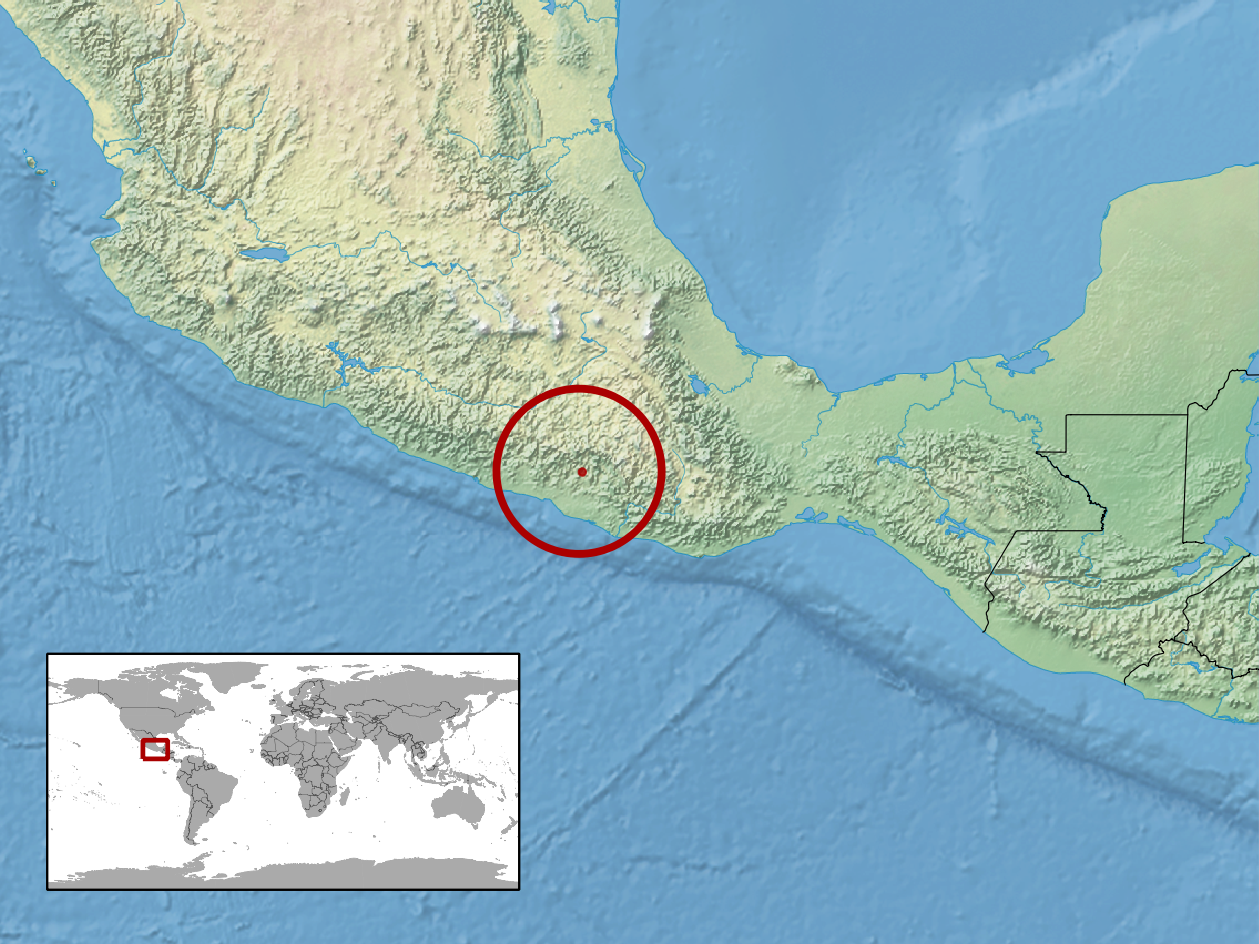
Geographic distribution of Xenosaurus penai

Xenosaurus penai, also known commonly as Pena's knob-scaled lizard, the Pico de Aguila knob-scaled lizard, and el xenosauro de Peña in Mexican Spanish, is a species of lizard in the family Xenosauridae. The species is native to Mexico.

== Etymology ==
The specific name, penai, is in honor of Mexican herpetologist Zeferino Uribe Peña.

== Description ==
Xenosaurus penai has widely scattered dorsal tubercles, which are separated from each other by a distance of two to four times their diameter. These dorsal tubercles are low and flattened, unlike the dorsal tubercles of other species of Xenosaurus which are conical and protuberant.

== Geographic distribution ==
Xenosaurus penai is endemic to the Mexican state of Guerrero.

== Habitat ==
The preferred natural habitat of Xenosaurus penai is rocky areas in pine-oak forest, at elevations around 1,800 m (5,900 ft).

== Reproduction ==
Xenosaurus penai is ovoviviparous.
