= List of amphibians and reptiles of Saint Barthélemy =

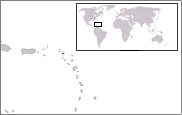
Location of Saint Barthélemy in the Caribbean

This is a list of amphibians and reptiles found on the island of Saint Barthélemy, in the Lesser Antilles chain in the Caribbean. It is taken from the last updated list of the fauna of Saint Barthélemy.

== Amphibians ==
There are four species of amphibian on Saint Barthélemy, three of which were introduced.

=== Frogs (Anura) ===
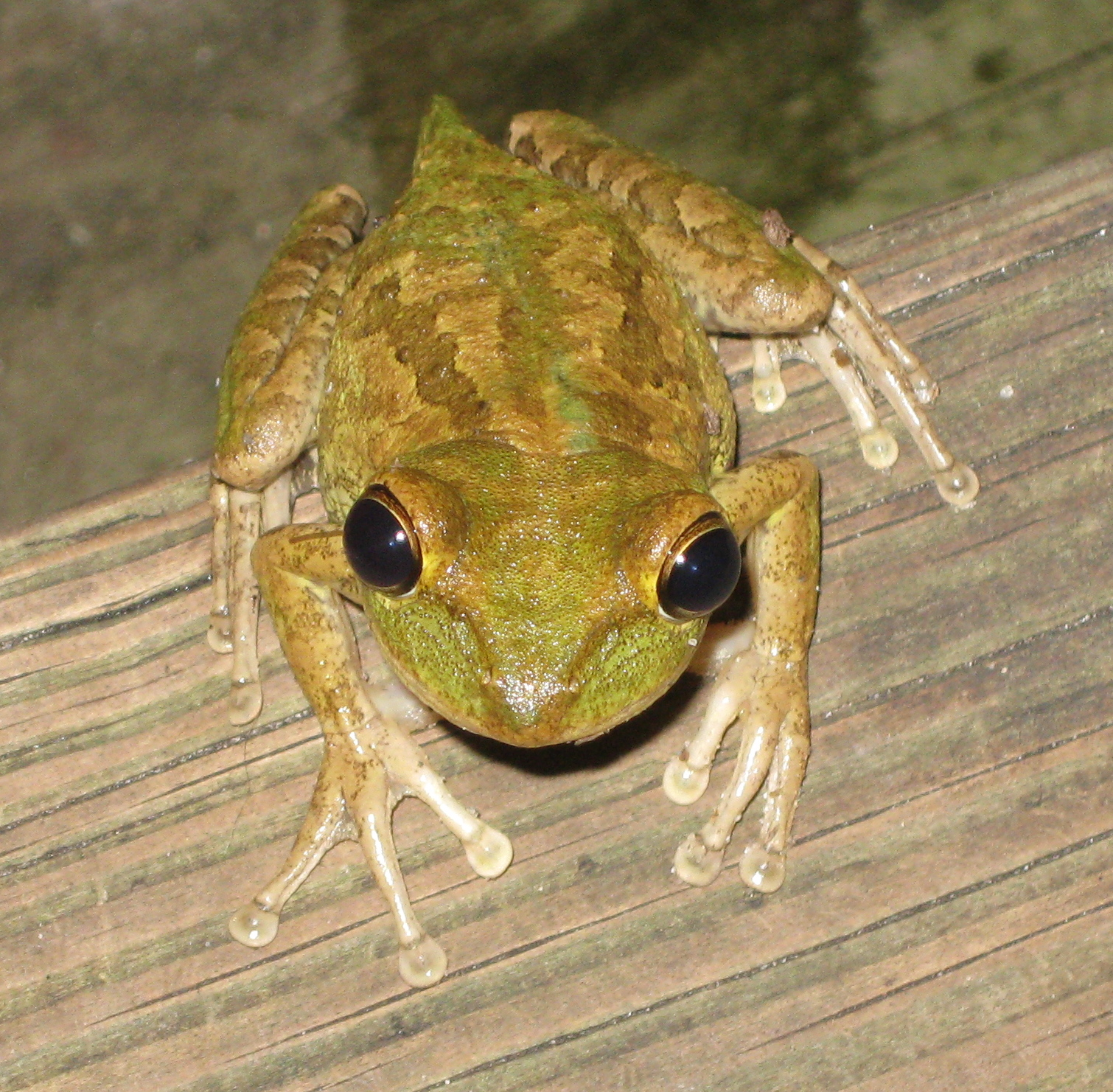
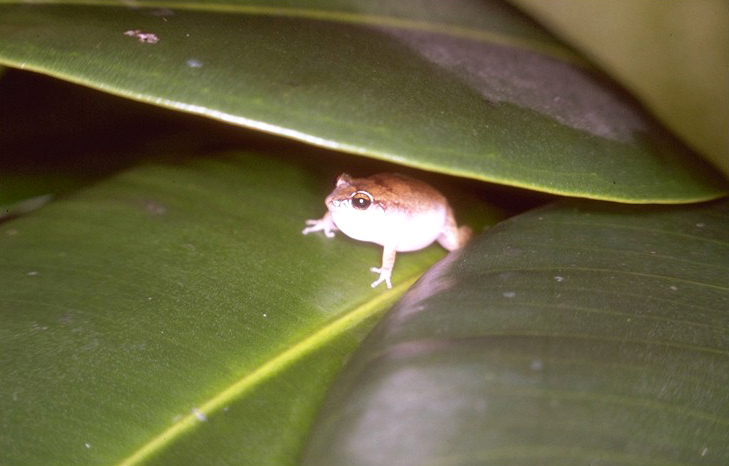
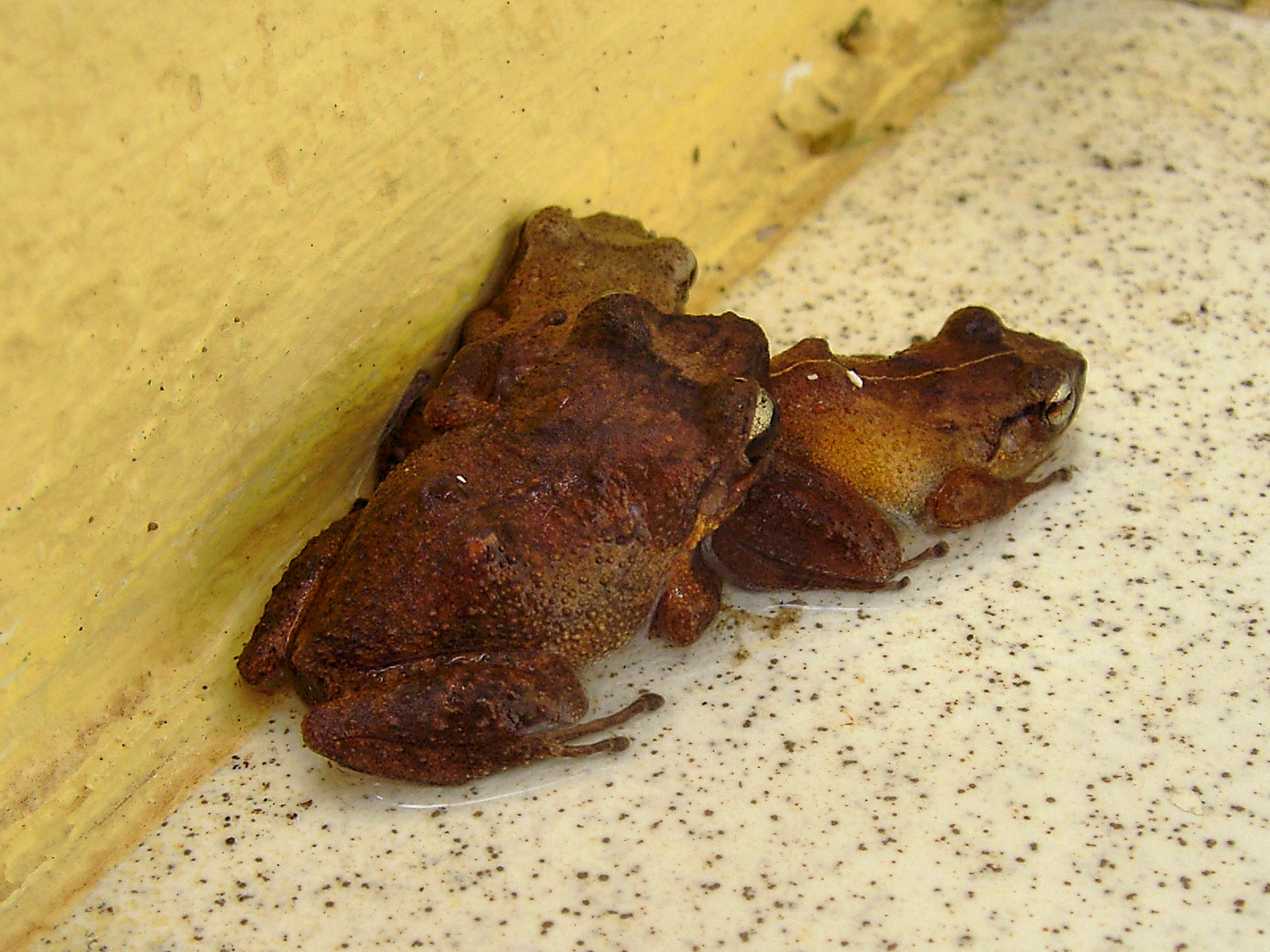
Tree frogs (Hylidae)
Species	Common name(s)	Notes	Image
Osteopilus septentrionalis	Cuban tree frog	Native to Cuba. First recorded on Saint Barthélemy by Breuil in 1996. Arrived on the island with plants from Florida, after Hurricane Luis in 1995.
Whistling frog (Eleutherodactylidae)
Species	Common name(s)	Notes	Image
Eleutherodactylus johnstonei	Lesser Antillean whistling frog, coqui Antillano, Johnstone's whistling frog	Endemic to the Lesser Antilles. First recorded on Saint Barthélemy by Breuil in 1996.
Eleutherodactylus martinicensis	Tink frog, Martinique tree frog	Endemic to the Lesser Antilles. First recorded on Saint Barthélemy by Magras in 1992 in Breuil 2002. Arrived on the island in the early 1980s.
Eleutherodactylus sp.	St-Bart whistling frog	Endemic to Saint Barthélemy. First recorded on Saint Barthélemy by l'Herminier in 1815, then Plée in 1821 in Breuil 2002. Now extinct.

== Reptiles ==
Including marine turtles and introduced species, there are 20 reptile species reported on Saint Barthélemy. One species, the blind snake Typhlops annae, is endemic to Saint Barthélemy.

=== Turtles (Testudines) ===
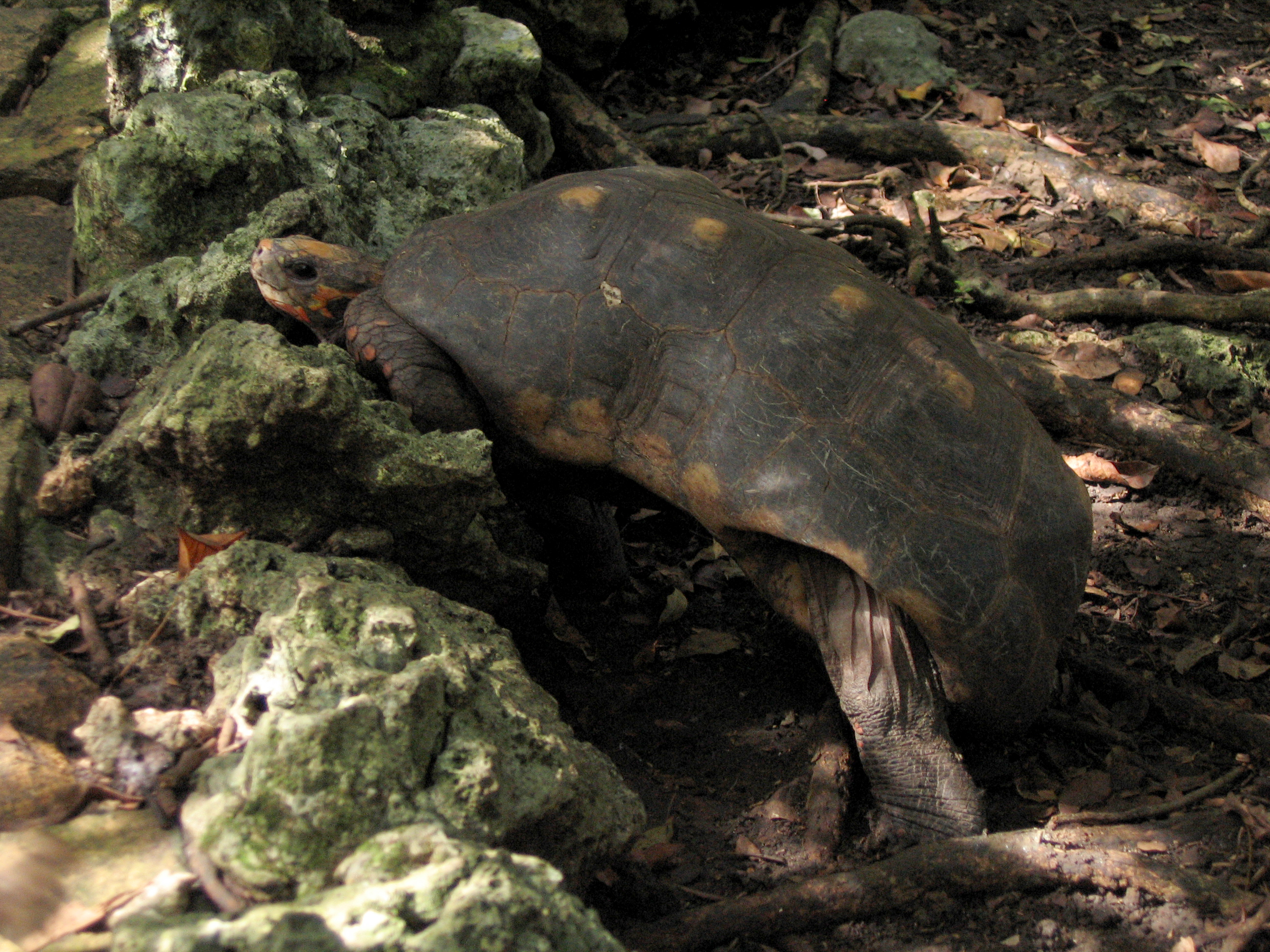
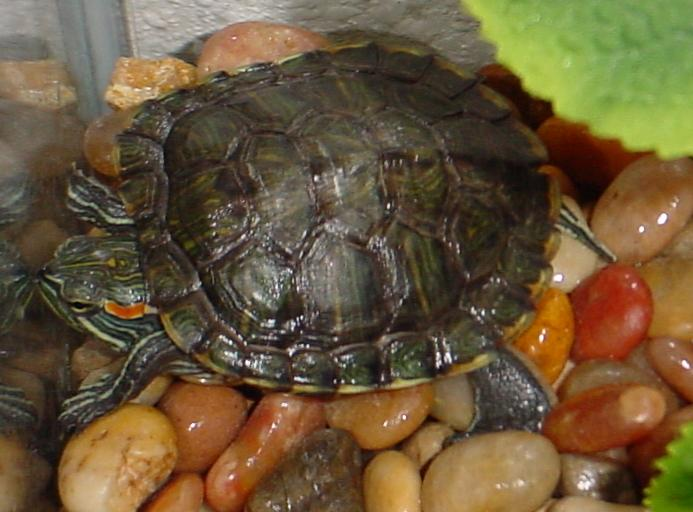
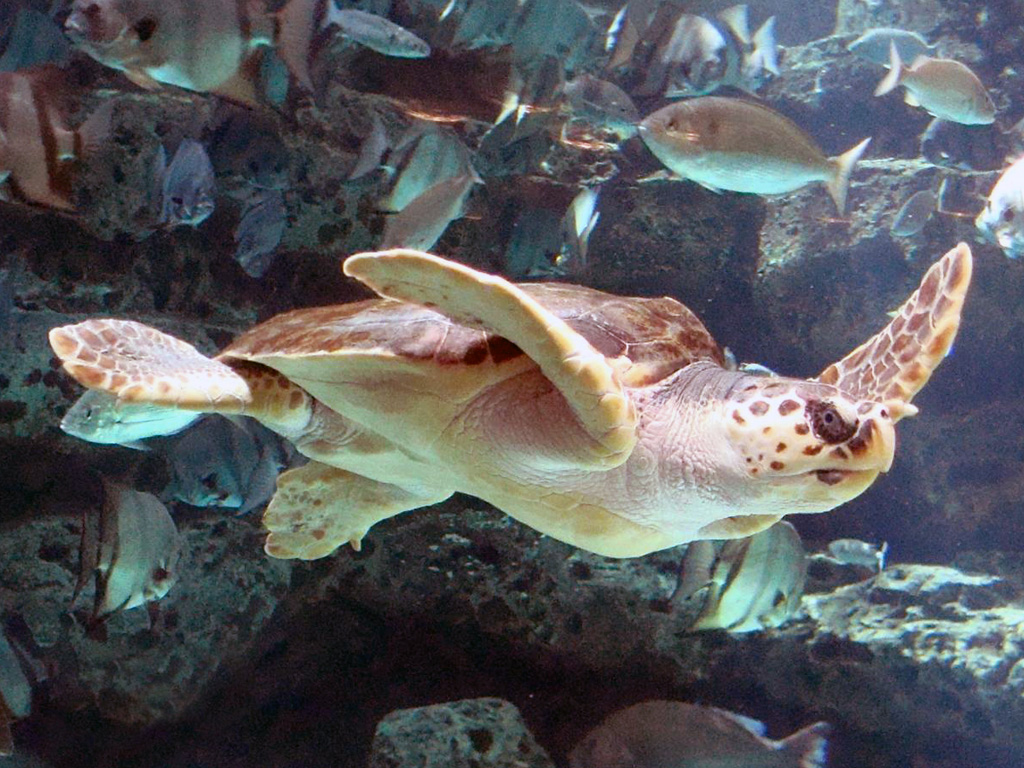
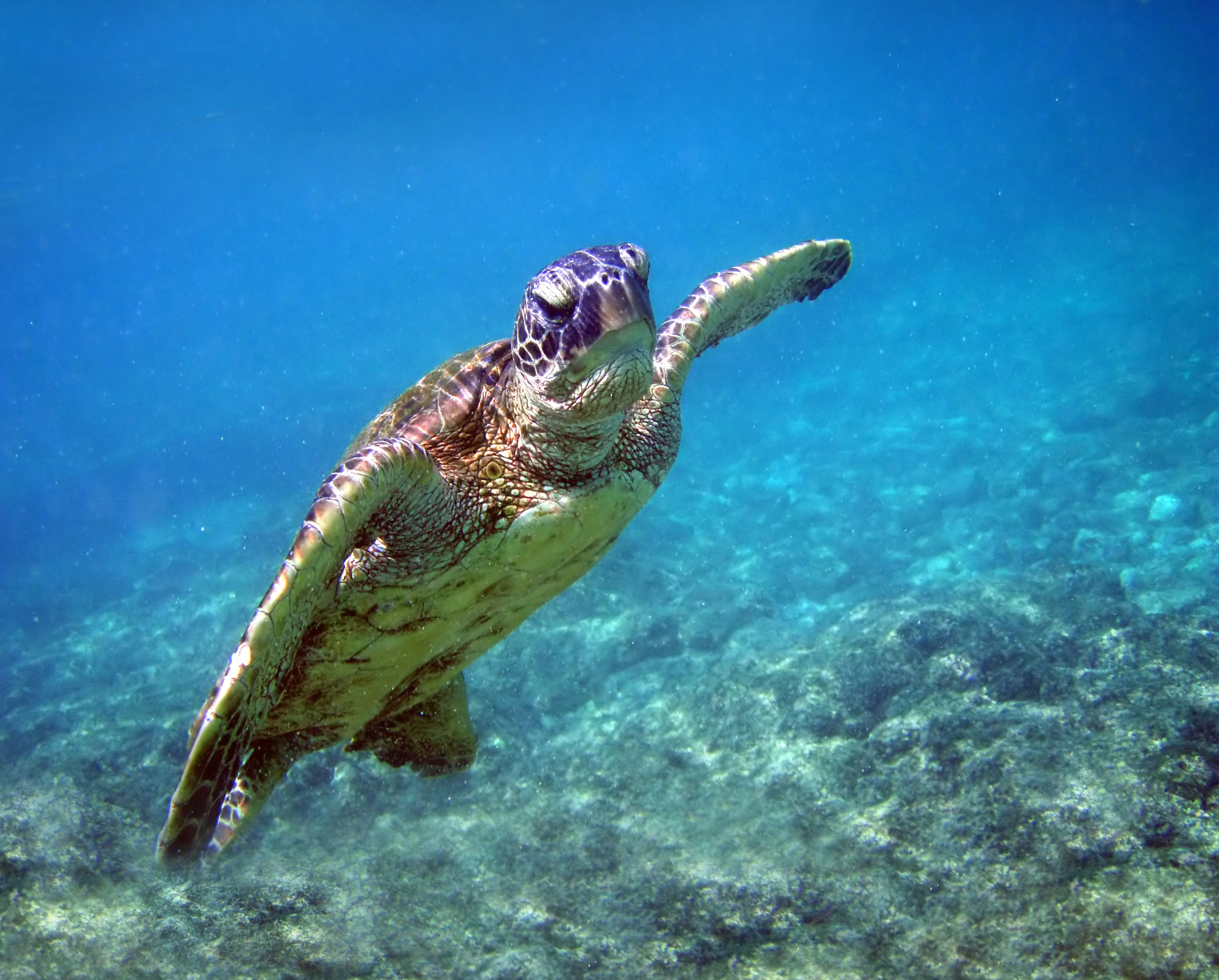
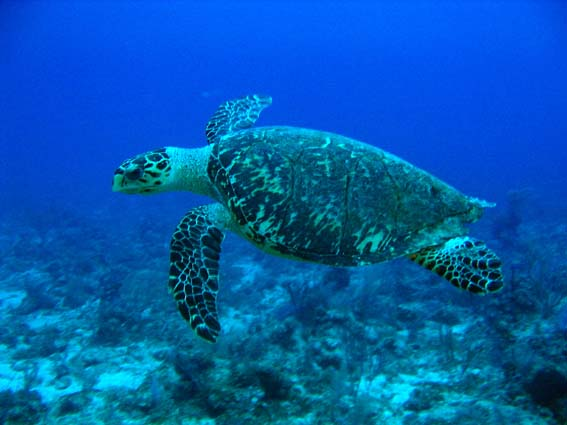
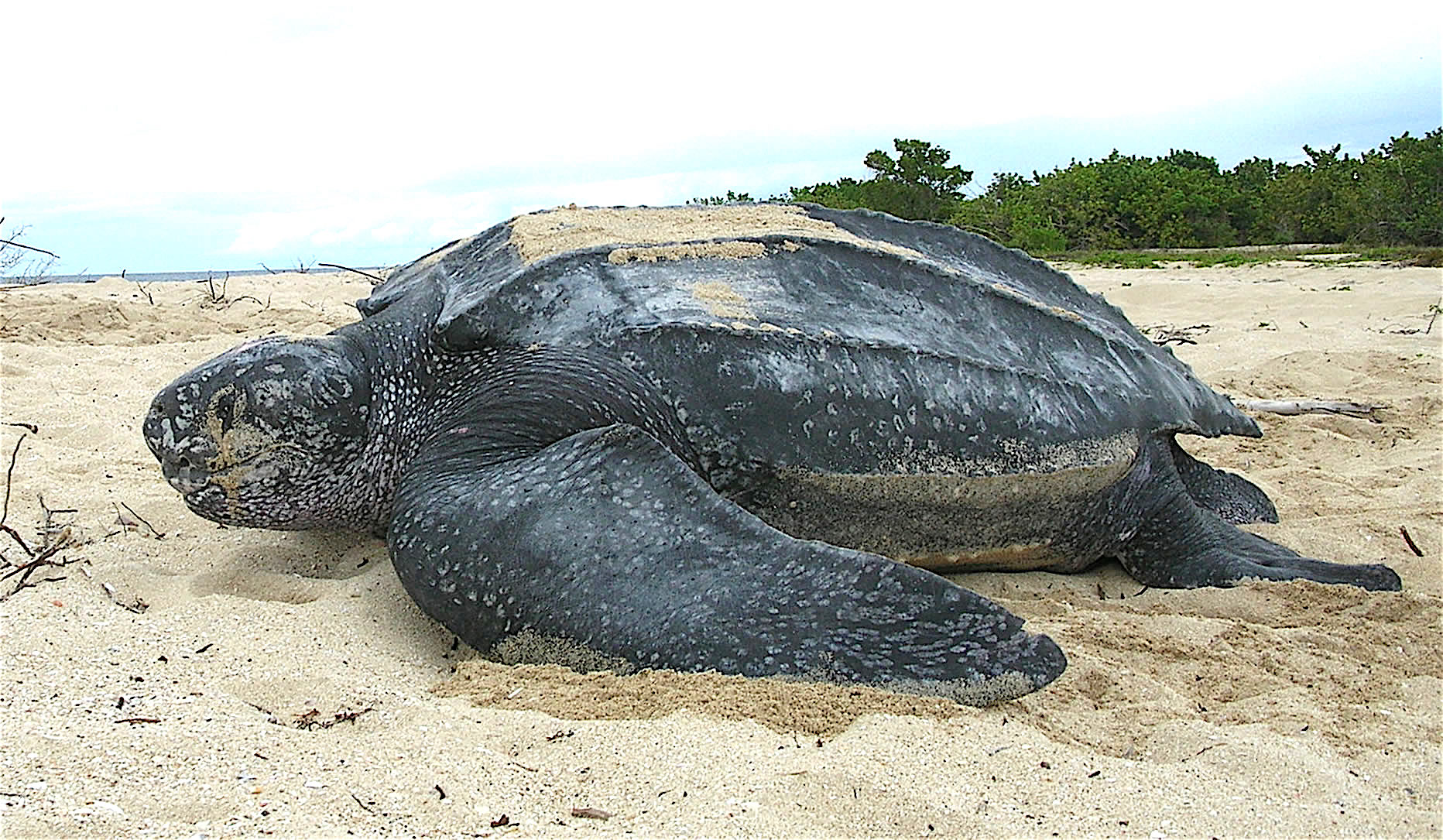
Tortoises (Testudinidae)
Species	Common name(s)	Notes	Image
Chelonoidis carbonarius	Red-footed tortoise	Native to South America, introduced and very common. The first mention of this species on Saint-Barthélemy was made by l'Herminier in 1815.
Pond turtles (Emydidae)
Species	Common name(s)	Notes	Image
Trachemys scripta elegans	Red-eared slider	Native to South America, introduced inside the St-Jean pond
Scaly sea turtles (Cheloniidae)
Species	Common name(s)	Notes	Image
Caretta caretta	Loggerhead turtle	Endangered.
Chelonia mydas	Green turtle	Endangered.
Eretmochelys imbricata	Hawksbill turtle	Critically endangered.
Leathery sea turtles (Dermochelyidae)
Species	Common name(s)	Notes	Image
Dermochelys coriacea	Leatherback turtle	Critically endangered.

=== Lizards and snakes (Squamata) ===
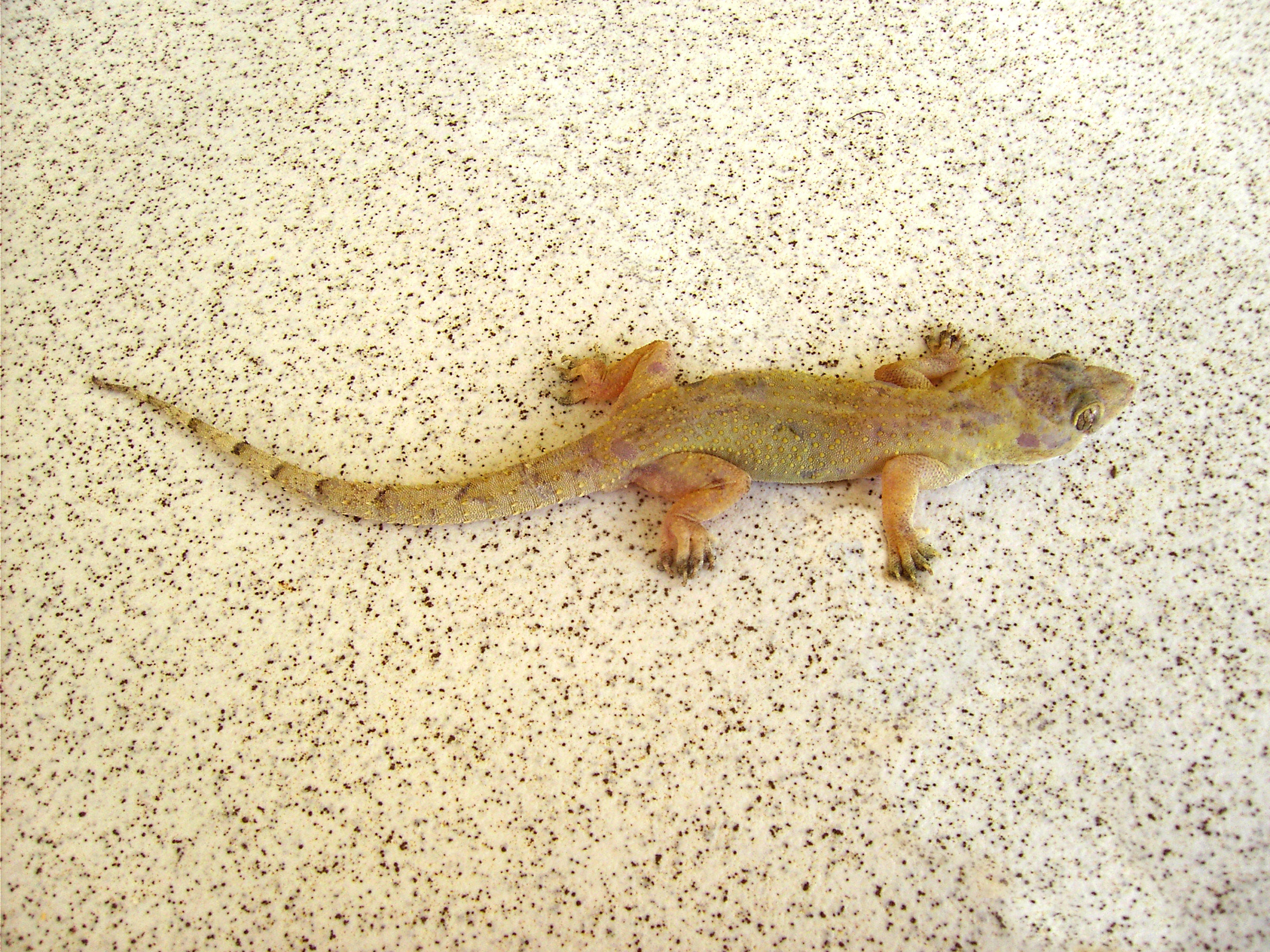
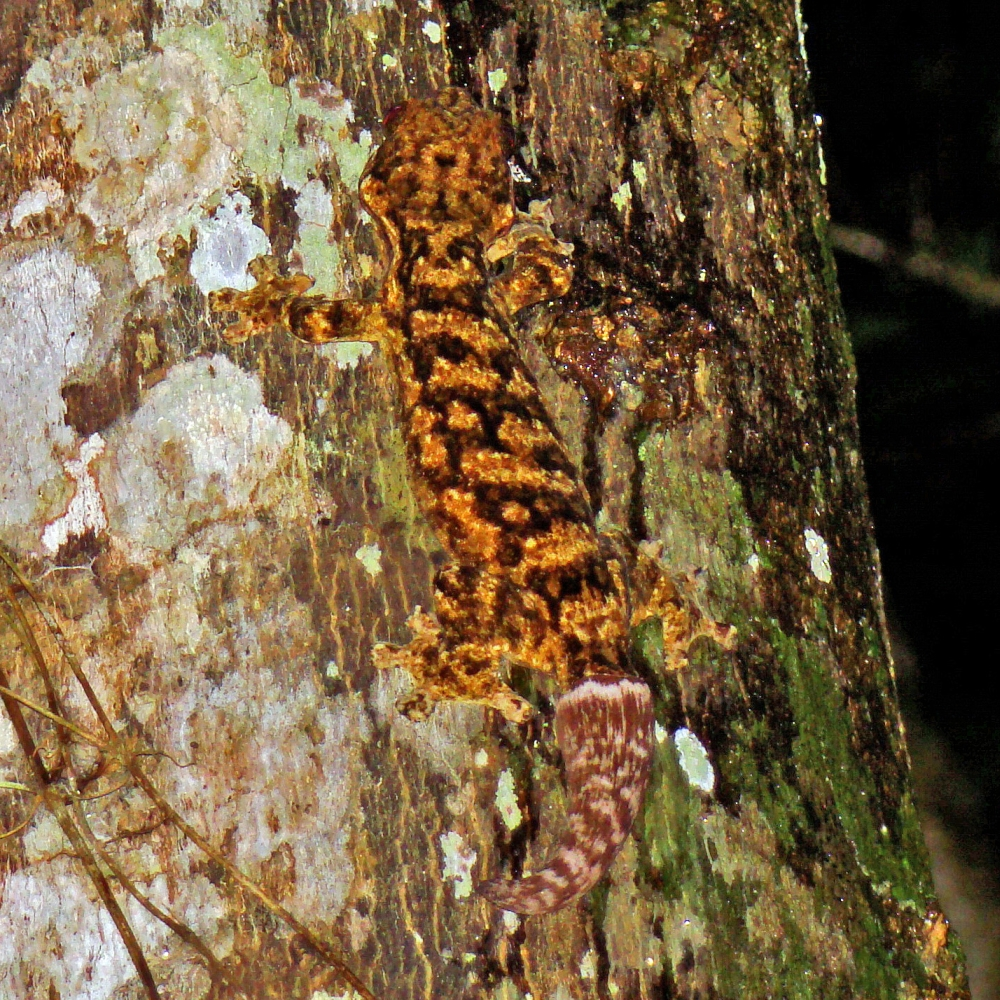
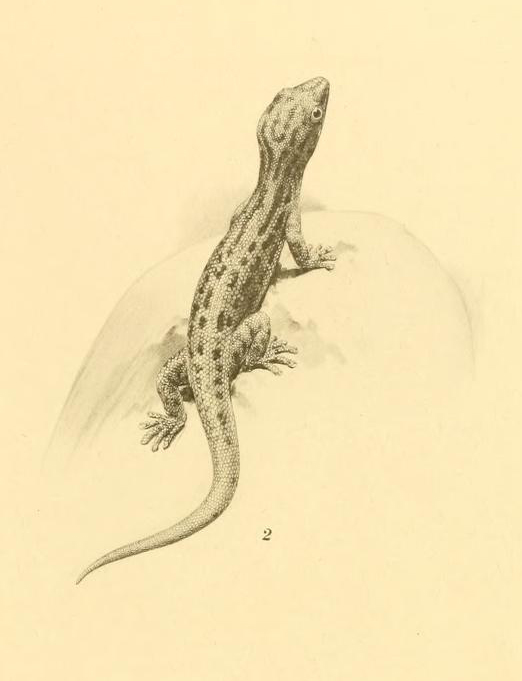
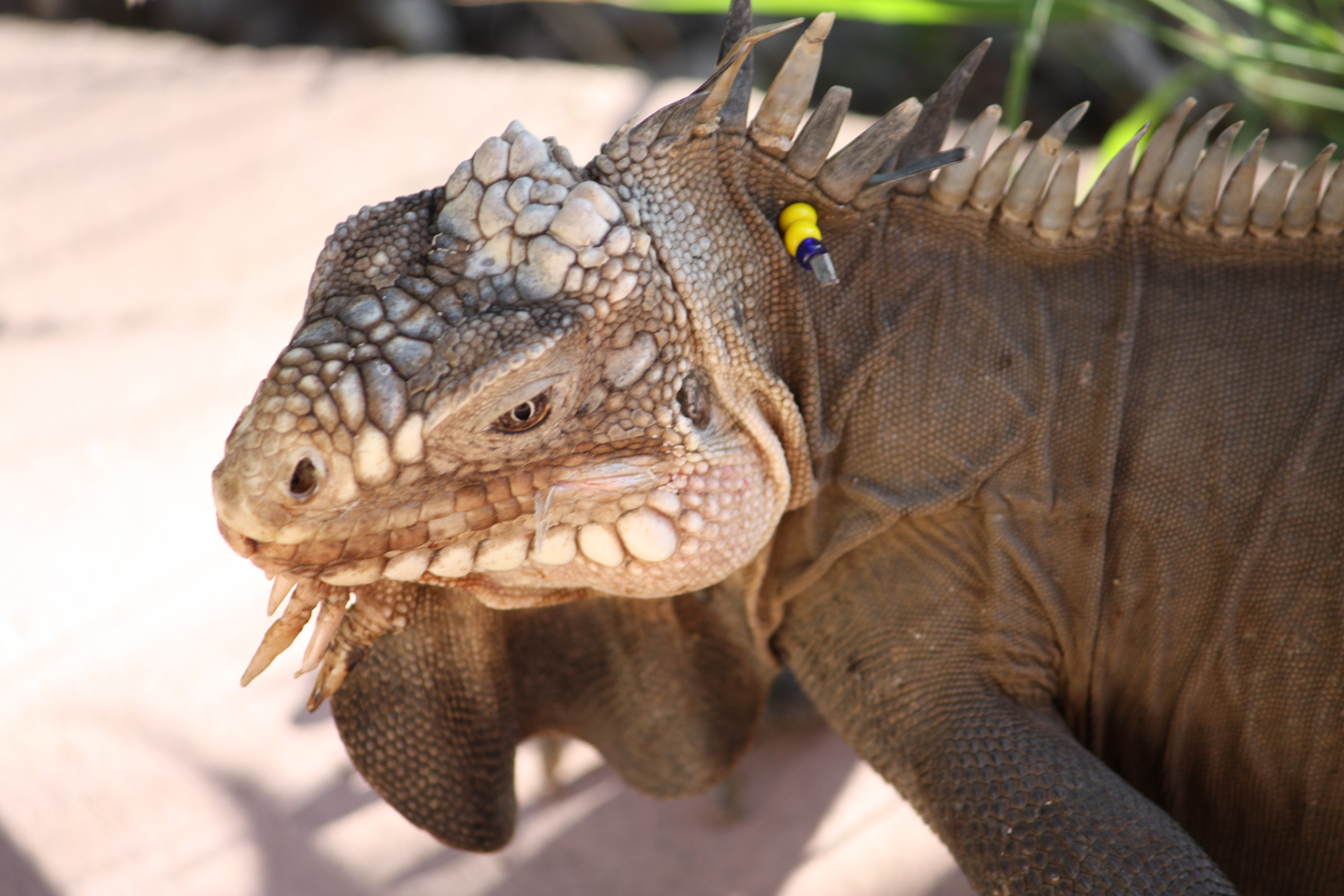
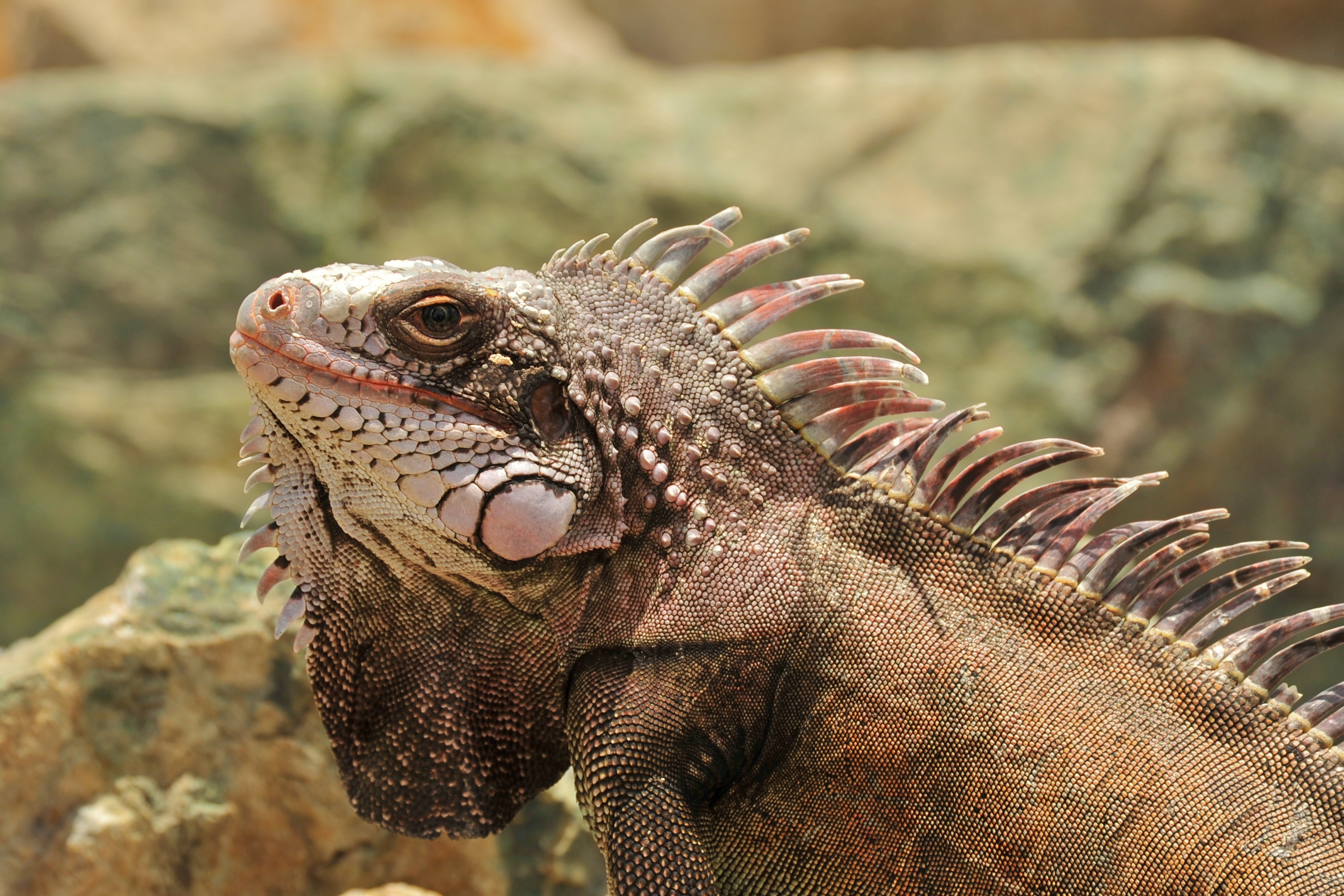
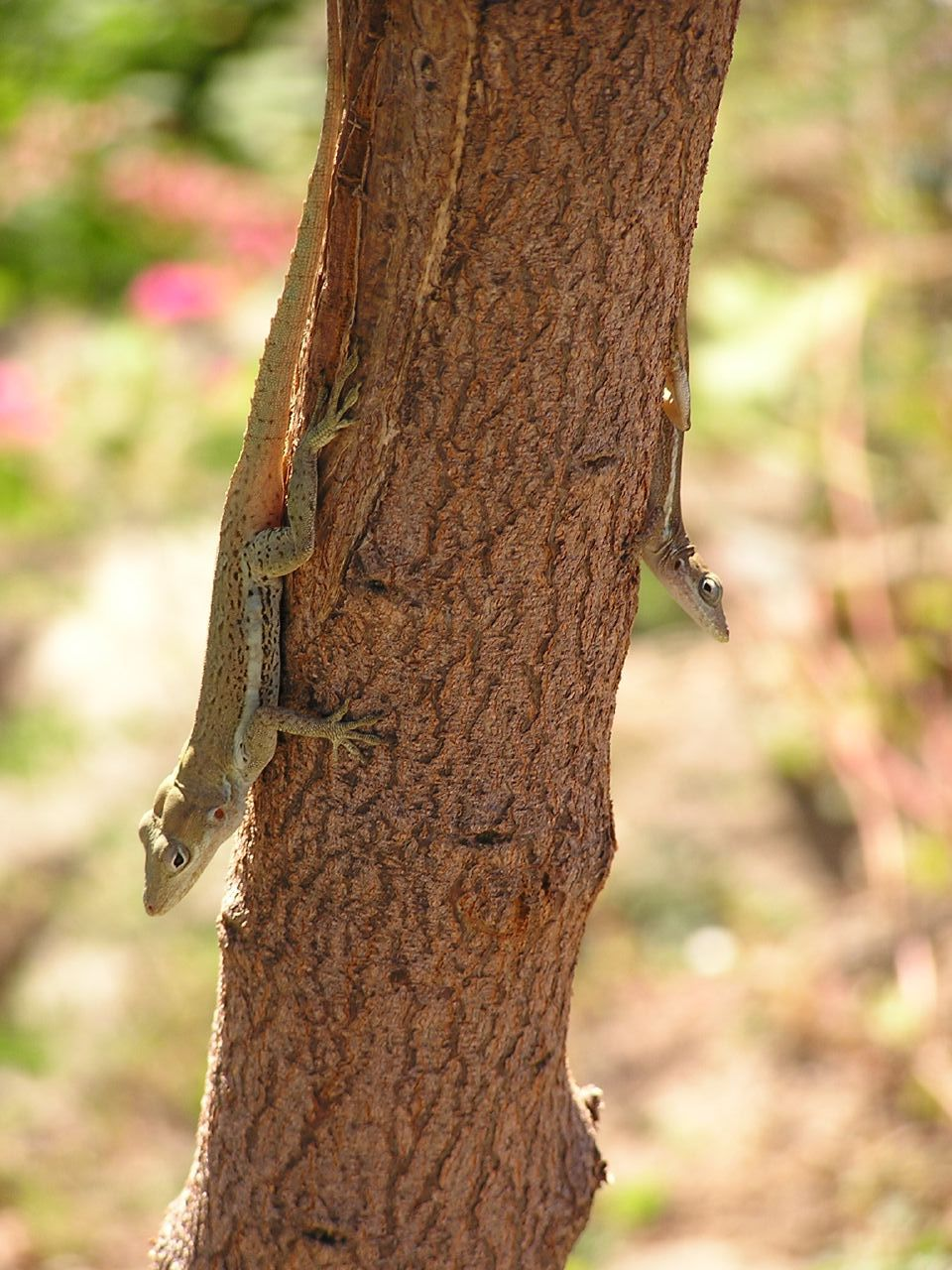
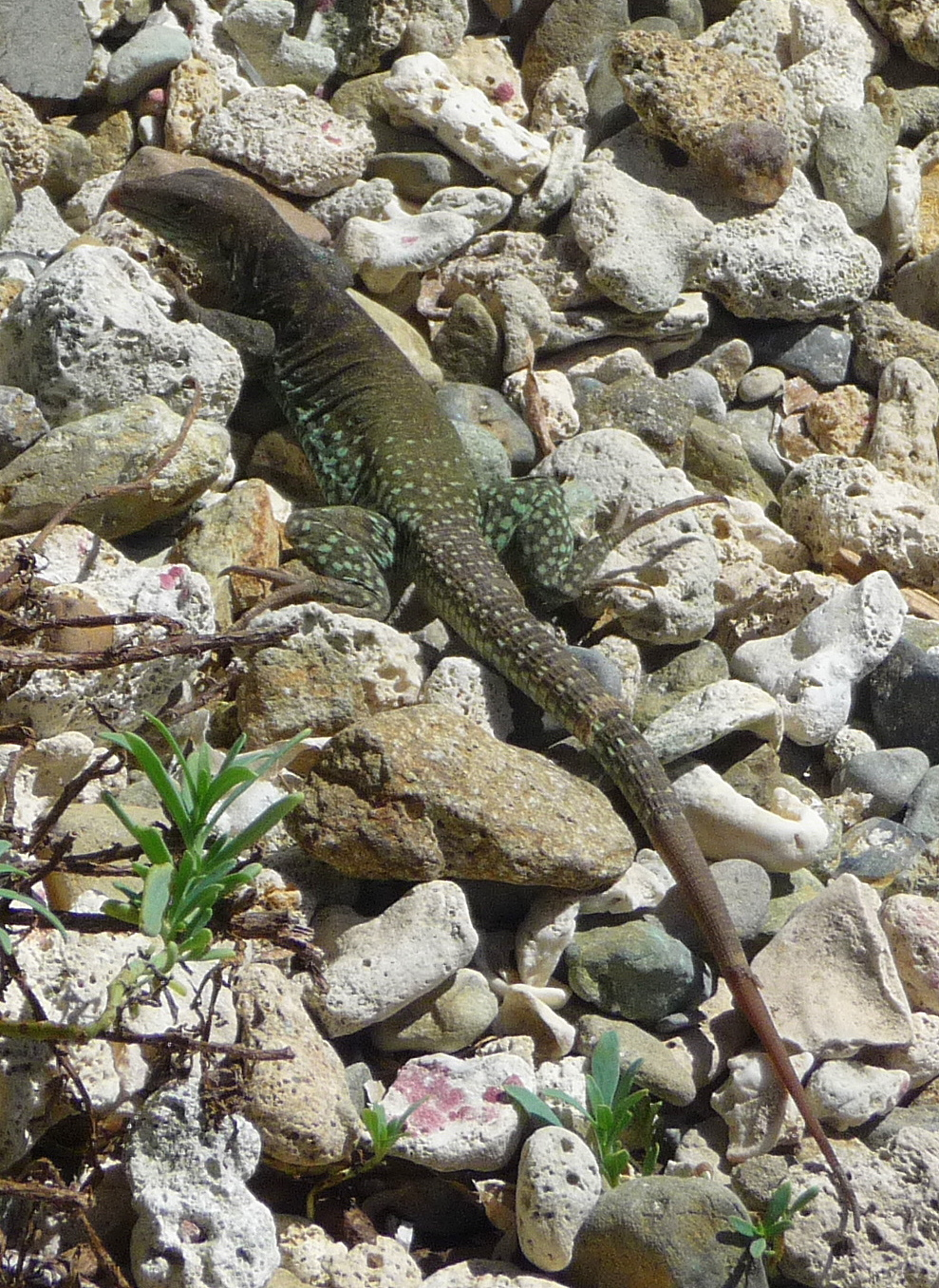
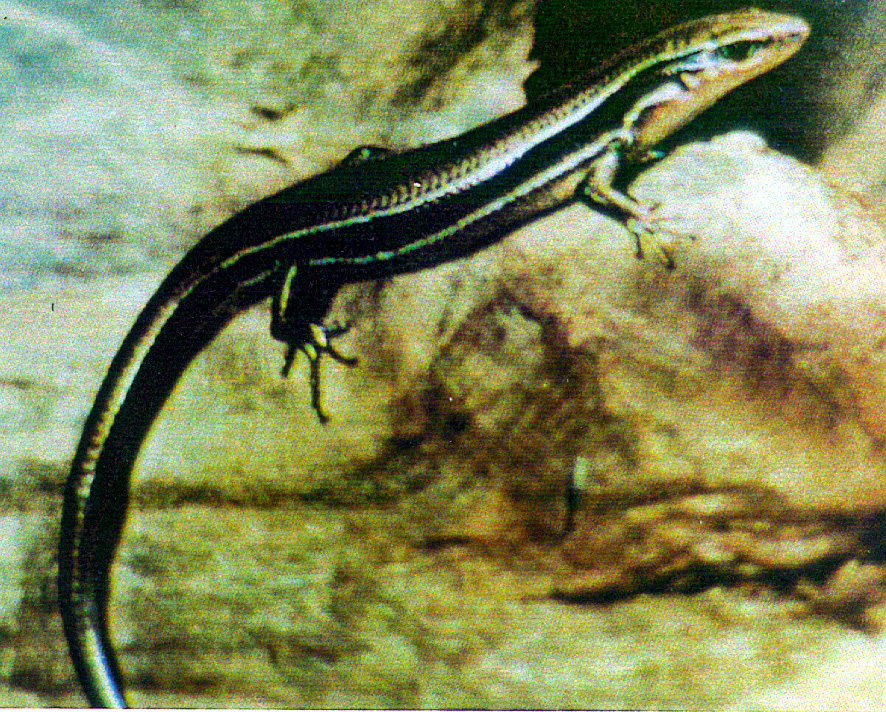
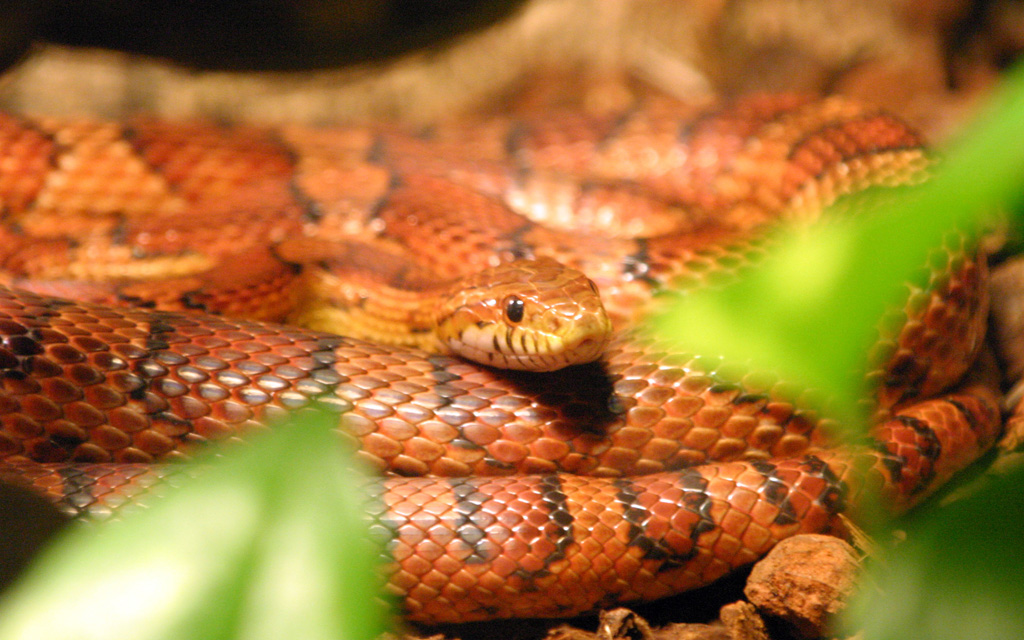
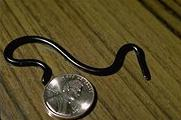
Geckos (Gekkonidae)
Species	Common name(s)	Notes	Image
Hemidactylus mabouia	House gecko	Native to Africa. The first mention of this species on Saint Barthélemy was made by Breuil in 1996.
Turnip-tailed gecko (Phyllodactylidae)
Species	Common name(s)	Notes	Image
Thecadactylus rapicauda	Turnip-tailed gecko	Native to Lesser Antilles and South America. The first mention of this species on Saint Barthélemy was made by Barbour in 1914.
Sphaero (Sphaerodactylidae)
Species	Common name(s)	Notes	Image
Sphaerodactylus parvus	Anguilla Bank sphaero	Endemic to Anguilla Bank (Saint Barthélemy, Saint Martin and Anguilla). The first mention of this species on Saint Barthélemy was made by King in 1962.
Sphaerodactylus sputator	Leeward banded sphaero	Endemic to Anguilla Bank (Saint Barthélemy, Saint Martin and Anguilla) and to Sint Eustatius bank (Sint Eustatius, Saint Kitts and Nevis). The first mention of this species on Saint Barthélemy was made by King in 1962.
Iguanas (Iguanidae)
Species	Common name(s)	Notes	Image
Iguana delicatissima	Lesser Antillean iguana	Endangered. Endemic to the Lesser Antilles. The first mention of this species on Saint Barthélemy was made by Euphrasen in 1788 in Tingbrand 1995.
Iguana iguana	Green iguana, common iguana	Introduced in Saint Barthélemy from Central America through Saint Martin, threatens the Lesser Antillean iguana by hybridization. The confirmation of hybridization between Iguana delicatissima and Iguana iguana on Saint Barthélemy was made in 2007 by Gregory Moulard.
Anoles (Dactyloidae)
Species	Common name(s)	Notes	Image
Anolis gingivinus	Anguilla Bank anole	Endemic to Anguilla Bank (Saint Barthélemy, Saint Martin and Anguilla). The first mention of this species on Saint Barthélemy was made by Cope in 1869.
Ameivas (Teiidae)
Species	Common name(s)	Notes	Image
Pholidoscelis plei	Anguilla Bank ameiva	Endemic to Anguilla Bank (Saint Barthélemy, Saint Martin and Anguilla). Cited on Martinique in error by Dumeril and Bibron in 1839, relocated correctly by Barbour and Noble 1915.
Antillean skinks (Mabuyidae)
Species	Common name(s)	Notes	Image
Spondylurus powelli	Anguilla Bank skink	Endemic to Saint Barthélemy and Anguilla. The first mention of this species on Saint Barthélemy was made by l'Herminier in 1815. Confirmed by Breuil in 1996 under the name Mabuya sloanii. And finally renamed Spondylurus powelli by Hedge and Conn in 2012.
Worm lizard (Gymnophthalmidae)
Species	Common name(s)	Notes	Image
Gymnophthalmus underwoodi	Smooth-scaled worm lizard	Native of South America. The first mention of this species on Saint Barthélemy was made by Questel and Boggio in 2012 to Petit Cul-de-Sac.
Dispadids snakes (Dipsadidae)
Species	Common name(s)	Notes	Image
Alsophis rijgersmaei	Anguilla Bank racer	Endangered. Endemic to Anguilla Bank (Saint Barthélemy, Saint Martin and Anguilla). The first mention of this species on Saint Barthélemy was made by l'Herminier in 1815.
Colubrids snakes (Colubridae)
Species	Common name(s)	Notes	Image
Pantherophis guttatus	Corn snake	Native to North America. The first mention of this species on Saint Barthélemy was made by Breuil en 1996. Naturalization confirmed by Questel and Vitry in 2012.
Worm snakes (Typhlopidae)
Species	Common name(s)	Notes	Image
Ramphotyphlops braminus	Brahminy blind snake, flowerpot blind snake	Native to Asia. The first mention of this species on Saint Barthélemy was made by Breuil and Magras in 2001.
Typhlops annae	Typhlops de St-Barth	Endemic to Saint Barthélemy. The first mention of this species on Saint Barthélemy was made by l'Herminier in 1815 and described by Breuil in 1996.
