= Xenosaurus arboreus =

Scientific classification
- Kingdom: Animalia
- Phylum: Chordata
- Class: Reptilia
- Order: Squamata
- Suborder: Anguimorpha
- Family: Xenosauridae
- Genus: Xenosaurus
- Species: X. arboreus

Binomial name
- Xenosaurus arboreus Lynch & Smith, 1965

Species of lizard

Xenosaurus arboreus, the arboreal knob-scaled lizard, is a lizard found in Oaxaca of Mexico.
