= Xenosaurus sanmartinensis =

Scientific classification
- Domain: Eukaryota
- Kingdom: Animalia
- Phylum: Chordata
- Class: Reptilia
- Order: Squamata
- Family: Xenosauridae
- Genus: Xenosaurus
- Species: X. sanmartinensis

Binomial name
- Xenosaurus sanmartinensis Werler & Shannon, 1961

Species of lizard

Xenosaurus sanmartinensis, the San Martin knob-scaled lizard, is a lizard found in Mexico.
