= Blutwurstia =

Blutwurstia Temporal range: Cenozoic (Eocene), ~50 Ma

Scientific classification
- Domain: Eukaryota
- Kingdom: Animalia
- Phylum: Chordata
- Class: Reptilia
- Order: Squamata
- Family: Xenosauridae
- Genus: †Blutwurstia; Smith et al., 2022
- Species: †B. oliviae

Binomial name
- †Blutwurstia oliviae Smith et al., 2022

Extinct genus of lizards

Blutwurstia is an extinct genus of lizards from the Eocene of Wyoming. The type and only species is Blutwurstia oliviae. It is closely related to the modern lizard Xenosaurus. The genus name is derived from the German for blood sausage.
