= Carusioidea =

Carusioidea Temporal range: Late Cretaceous – Present

Scientific classification
- Domain: Eukaryota
- Kingdom: Animalia
- Phylum: Chordata
- Class: Reptilia
- Order: Squamata
- Infraorder: Neoanguimorpha
- Clade: Carusioidea; Gao and Norell, 1998

Subgroups
- †Carusia; Xenosauridae

Clade of lizards

Carusioidea is a clade of lizards that includes the family Xenosauridae (knob-scaled lizards) from Central America and the extinct genus Carusia from the Late Cretaceous of Mongolia. It was named in 1998 after a sister-group relationship was found between Carusia and Xenosauridae. Phylogenetic analysis indicates that Carusioidea is the most basal clade within Anguimorpha. Features that help define Carusioidea include closely spaced orbits or eye sockets separated by fused frontal bones, a connection between the jugal and squamosal bones below the supratemporal arch, and a covering of bony osteoderms over the skull roof. Below is a cladogram showing the phylogenetic relationships of carusioids from Gao and Norell (1998):

- Squamata (lizards)
  - Iguania
  - - Scincomorpha
    - - Gekkota
      - Anguimorpha
        - Carusioidea
          - †Carusia
          - Xenosauridae
            - Shinisaurus*
            - Xenosaurus
        - - Anguidae
          - Varanoidea
  *Shinisaurus is no longer considered a xenosaurid but rather a varanoid lizard
