= Xenosaurus mendozai =

Scientific classification
- Kingdom: Animalia
- Phylum: Chordata
- Class: Reptilia
- Order: Squamata
- Suborder: Anguimorpha
- Family: Xenosauridae
- Genus: Xenosaurus
- Species: X. mendozai

Binomial name
- Xenosaurus mendozai Nieto-Montes de Oca, García-Vázquez, Zúñiga-Vega & Schmidt-Ballardo, 2013

Species of lizard

Xenosaurus mendozai is a lizard found in Mexico.
