= Xenosaurus manipulus =

Scientific classification
- Kingdom: Animalia
- Phylum: Chordata
- Class: Reptilia
- Order: Squamata
- Suborder: Anguimorpha
- Family: Xenosauridae
- Genus: Xenosaurus
- Species: X. manipulus

Binomial name
- Xenosaurus manipulus Nieto-Montes de Oca, Castresana-Villanueva, Canseco-Márquez, & Campbell, 2022

Species of lizard

Xenosaurus manipulus is a lizard found in Mexico.
