= Xenosaurus tzacualtipantecus =

Scientific classification
- Domain: Eukaryota
- Kingdom: Animalia
- Phylum: Chordata
- Class: Reptilia
- Order: Squamata
- Family: Xenosauridae
- Genus: Xenosaurus
- Species: X. tzacualtipantecus

Binomial name
- Xenosaurus tzacualtipantecus Woolrich-Piña & Smith, 2012

Species of lizard

Xenosaurus tzacualtipantecus, the Zacualtipá́n knob-scaled lizard, is a lizard found in Mexico.
