= Xenosaurus rackhami =

Scientific classification
- Kingdom: Animalia
- Phylum: Chordata
- Class: Reptilia
- Order: Squamata
- Suborder: Anguimorpha
- Family: Xenosauridae
- Genus: Xenosaurus
- Species: X. rackhami

Binomial name
- Xenosaurus rackhami Stuart, 1941

Species of lizard

Xenosaurus rackhami, also known as Rackham's knob-scaled lizard, is a species of lizard found in Mexico and Guatemala.
