= Xenosaurus phalaroanthereon =

Conservation status
- Data Deficient (IUCN 3.1)

Scientific classification
- Kingdom: Animalia
- Phylum: Chordata
- Class: Reptilia
- Order: Squamata
- Suborder: Anguimorpha
- Family: Xenosauridae
- Genus: Xenosaurus
- Species: X. phalaroanthereon

Binomial name
- Xenosaurus phalaroanthereon Nieto-Montes de Oca, Campbell, & Flores-Villela, 2001
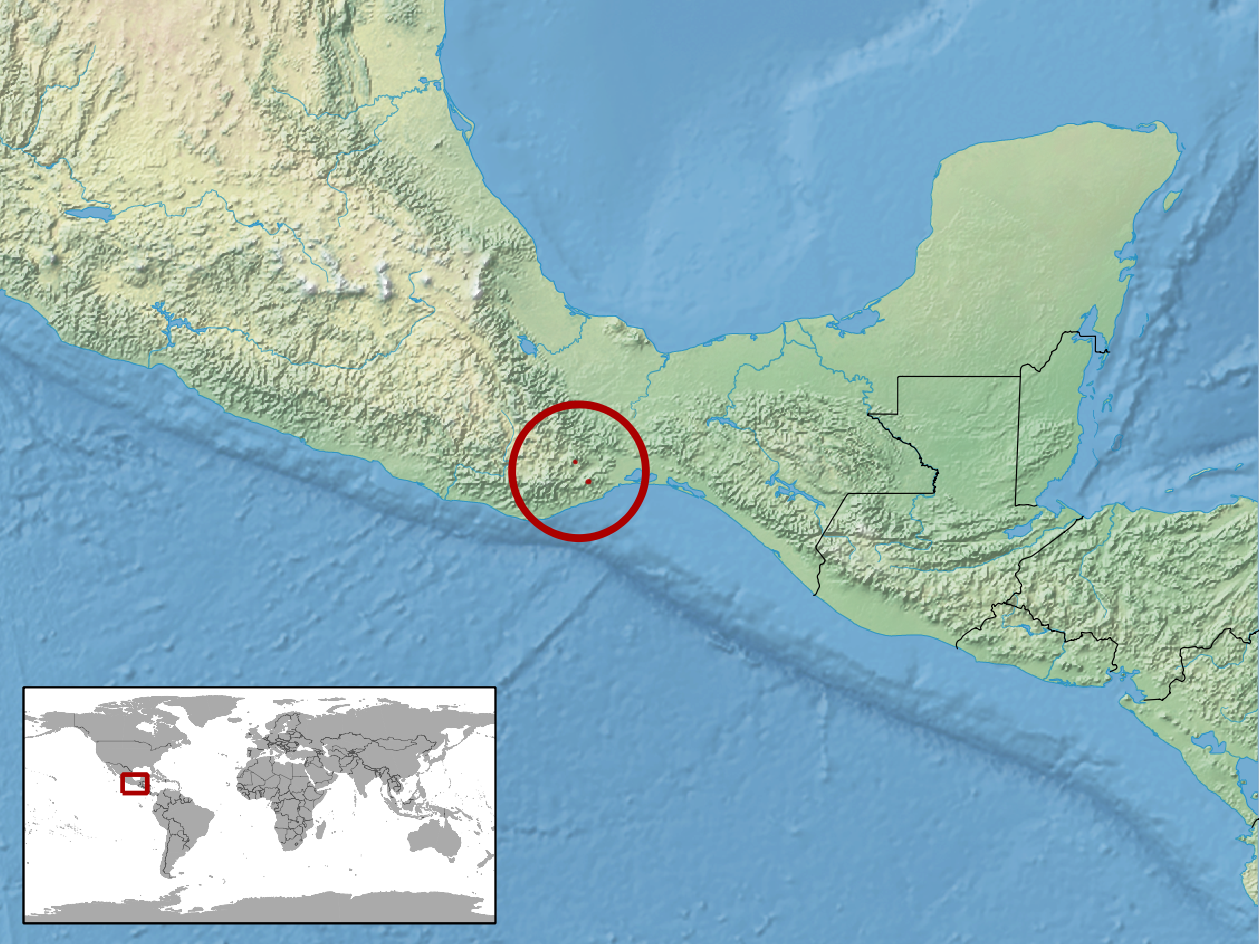

Species of lizard

Xenosaurus phalaroanthereon, the chin-spotted knob-scaled lizard, is a lizard found in Mexico.
