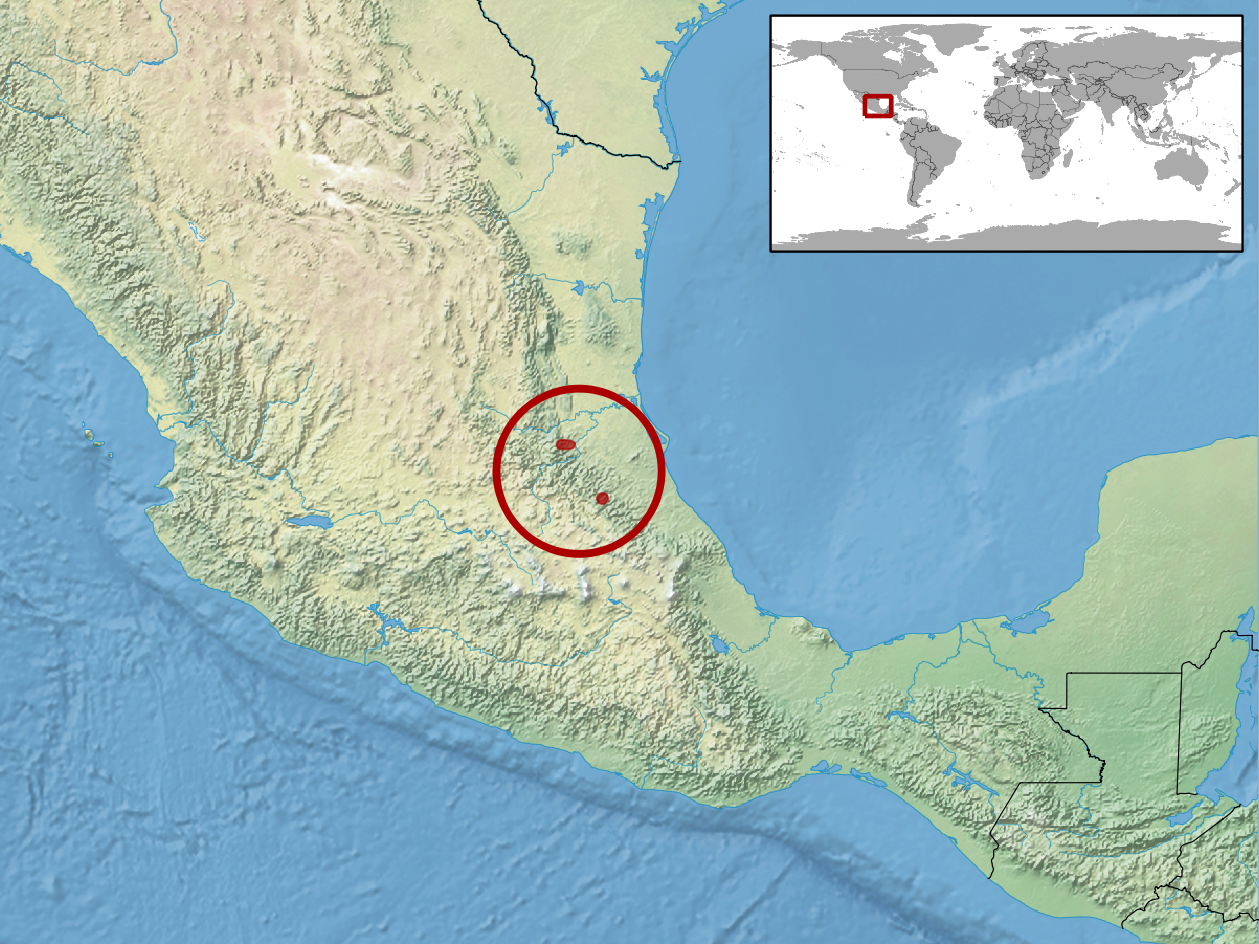
- Geographic distribution of Xenosaurus newmanorum

Conservation status
- Endangered (IUCN 3.1)

Scientific classification
- Kingdom: Animalia
- Phylum: Chordata
- Class: Reptilia
- Order: Squamata
- Suborder: Anguimorpha
- Family: Xenosauridae
- Genus: Xenosaurus
- Species: X. newmanorum

Binomial name
- Xenosaurus newmanorum Taylor, 1949

Synonyms
- Xenosaurus grandis newmanorum Taylor, 1949

= Xenosaurus newmanorum =

Species of lizard

Xenosaurus newmanorum, also known commonly as Newman's knob-scaled lizard, is a species of lizard in the family Xenosauridae. The species is endemic to Mexico.

== Etymology ==
The specific name, newmanorum (Latin, genitive, plural), is in honor of American zoologist Robert J. Newman and his wife Marcella Newman.

== Habitat ==
The preferred natural habitat of Xenosaurus newmanorum is rocky areas in forest, at elevations of 1,100–2,000 m (3,600–6,600 ft), but it has also been found in plantations of citrus fruits and coffee.

== Reproduction ==
The mode of reproduction of Xenosaurus newmanorum has been described as viviparous and as ovoviviparous. Litter size is only one or two young. The gestation period lasts approximately one year, and the female only bears young every other year.
