= Xenosaurus rectocollaris =

Conservation status
- Least Concern (IUCN 3.1)

Scientific classification
- Kingdom: Animalia
- Phylum: Chordata
- Class: Reptilia
- Order: Squamata
- Suborder: Anguimorpha
- Family: Xenosauridae
- Genus: Xenosaurus
- Species: X. rectocollaris

Binomial name
- Xenosaurus rectocollaris Smith and Iverson, 1993
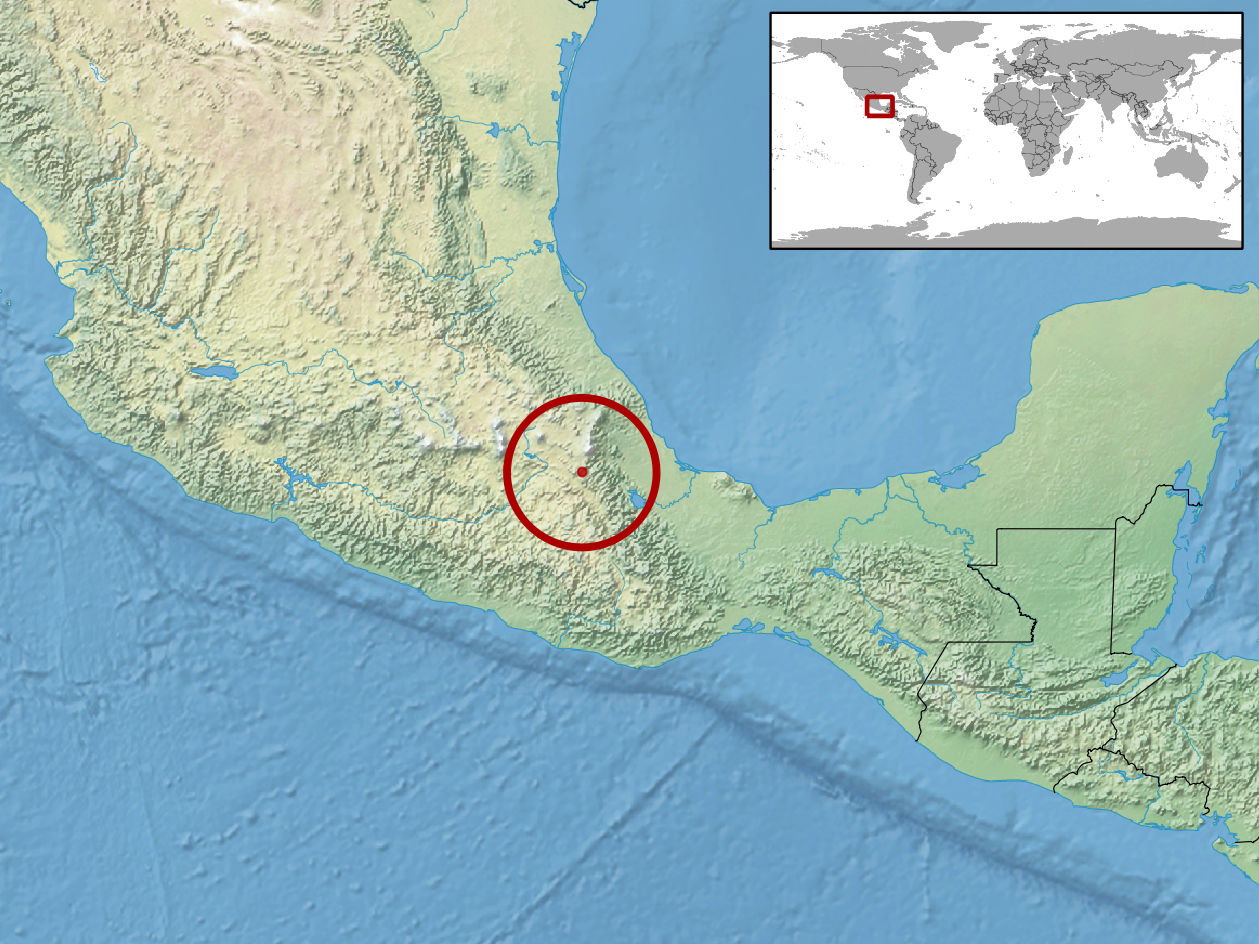

Species of lizard

Xenosaurus rectocollaris, sometimes known as the pallid knob-scaled lizard, is a species of viviparous lizard. It is endemic to Mexico where it is known from the Sierra Madre de Oaxaca of Oaxaca and Puebla states. It is a rare species occurring in rock crevices in pristine semi-arid areas.
