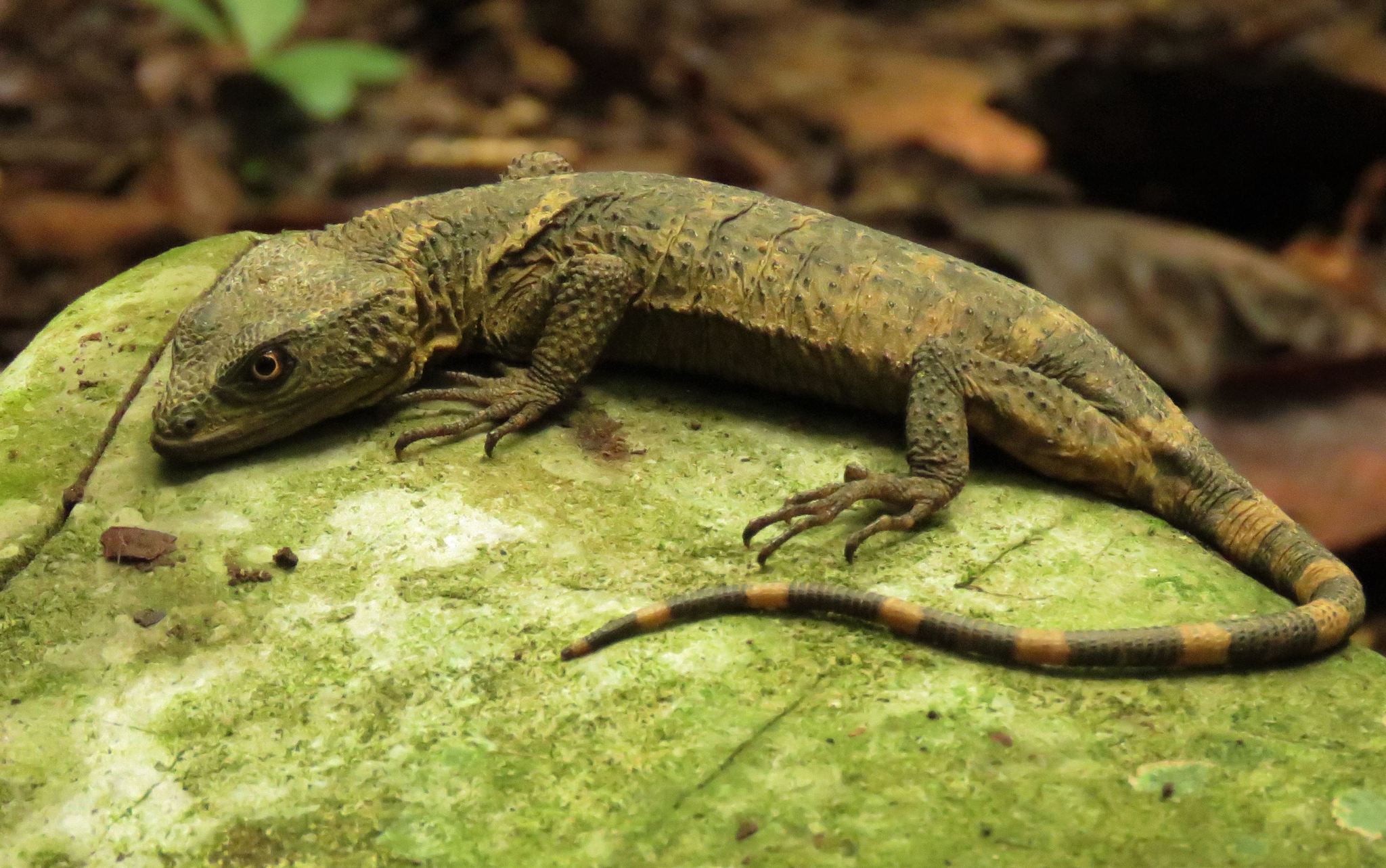

Conservation status
- Vulnerable (IUCN 3.1)

Scientific classification
- Kingdom: Animalia
- Phylum: Chordata
- Class: Reptilia
- Order: Squamata
- Suborder: Anguimorpha
- Family: Xenosauridae
- Genus: Xenosaurus
- Species: X. grandis

Binomial name
- Xenosaurus grandis (Gray, 1856)
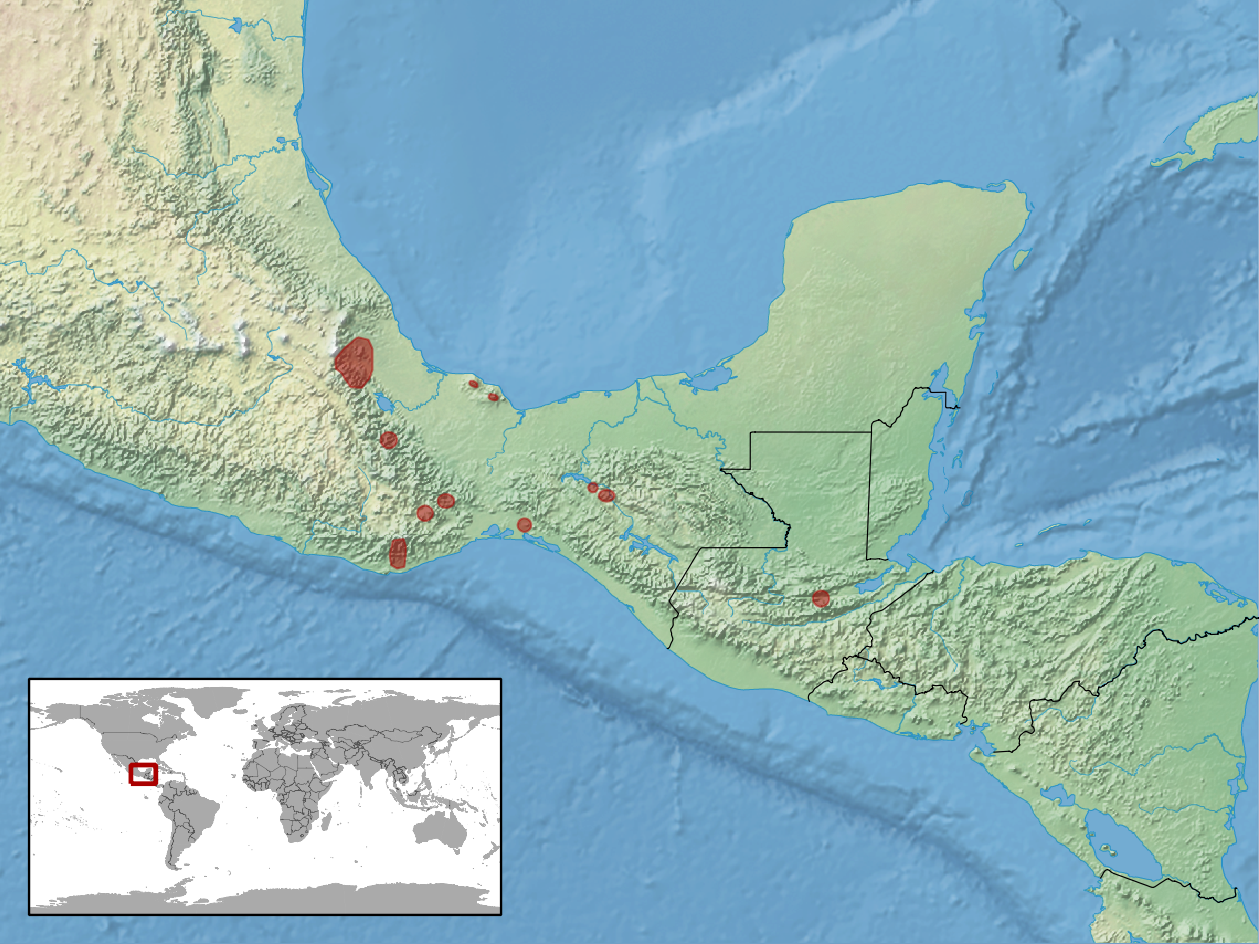

Synonyms
- Cubina grandis Gray, 1856; Xenosaurus fasciatus W. Peters, 1861; Xenosaurus grandis — Cope, 1867

= Xenosaurus grandis =

Species of lizard

Xenosaurus grandis, commonly known as the knob-scaled lizard, is a species of diurnal, terrestrial lizard endemic to Mexico and Guatemala. It primarily inhabits tropical rainforests. It dwells in rock crevices and eats insects.

== Etymology ==
The scientific name, Xenosaurus grandis, comes from the Greek words xenos, meaning “alien”, “stranger”, or “foreigner”, saurus, meaning “lizard”, and grandis, meaning “grand” or “great”. Its common name, “knob-scaled lizard”, refers to the bumpy, “knob-like” scales found on the upper portion of its body.

== Taxonomy ==
There are five recognized subspecies, which are spread throughout the species’ range, and the species complex is being reevaluated. Some of the subspecies are currently in the process of being elevated to species status. The species as a whole is listed as vulnerable by the IUCN Red List and its population is currently decreasing.

== Physiology ==
=== Appearance ===
Xenosaurus grandis has a flattened head and body and is nearly always found in rock crevices, or at least with a portion of the body in a crevice. Its flattened physiology is most likely an adaptation to allow it to squeeze into narrow crevices. Its color ranges from dark grey to dark brown, with lighter bands or blotches. It has a forked tongue, and small, sharp, fang-like teeth.

=== Body size ===
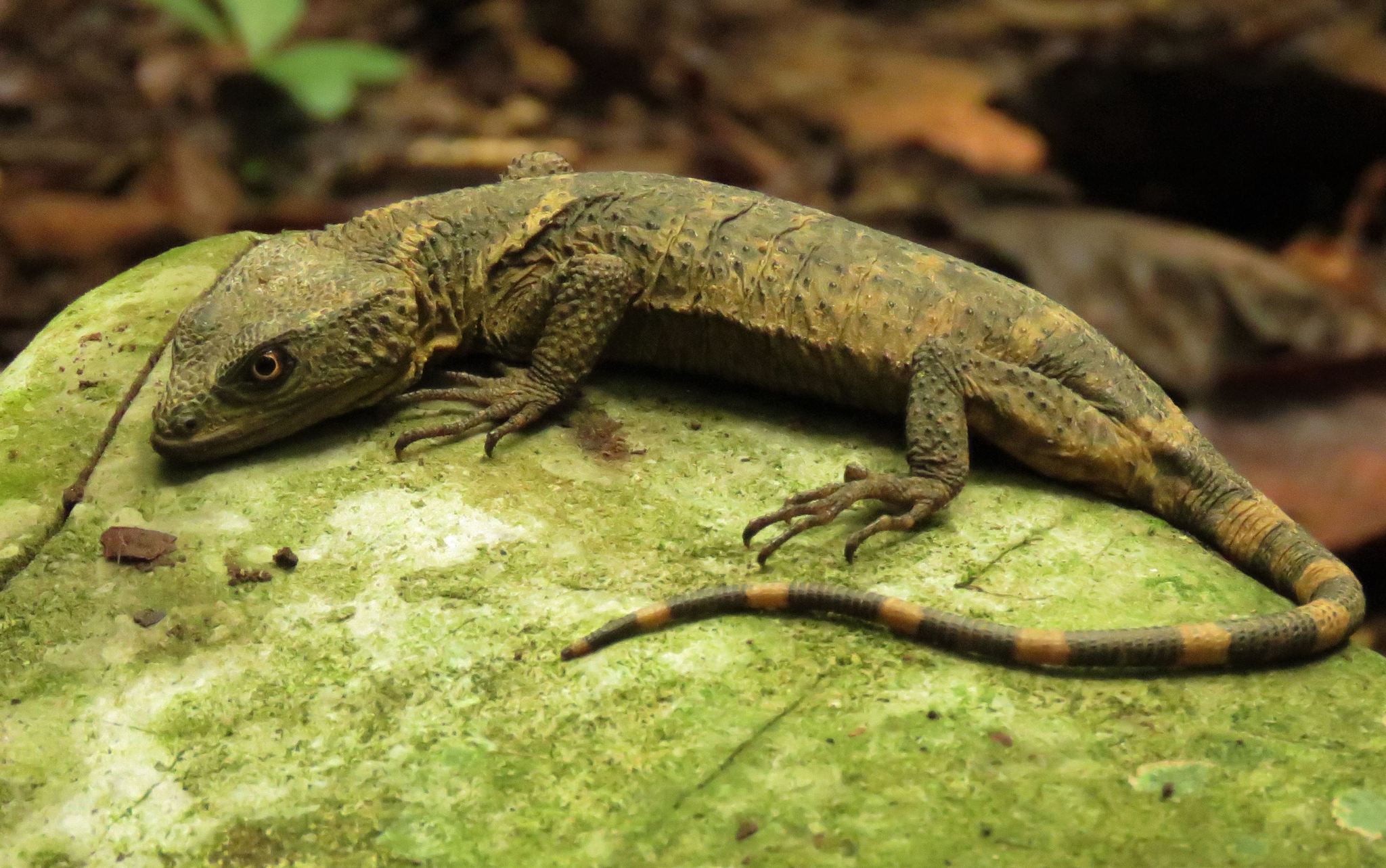
In Mexico

On average, the snout-vent length (SVL) of Xenosaurus grandis is 6.8 - 12.9 cm.

While some species of Xenosaurus do not exhibit sexual dimorphism, Xenosaurus grandis, among other species, is one that does. In Xenosaurus grandis, males and females do not differ significantly in body size, but males have proportionately larger heads (in length and width) than females. Males and females of X. grandis do not exhibit a significant difference in femur length or head shape.

=== Body temperature ===
Xenosaurus grandis is a diurnally active thermal conformer, meaning that its body temperature correlates with substrate and air temperatures. Its average body temperature is 22.7 C. Air and substrate temperatures may be particularly relevant in Xenosaurus grandis since they are almost exclusively ground and crevice dwellers. Temperatures seem to differ across Xenosaurus species, possibly because of environment and habitat. Xenosaurus grandis appears to inhabit more dense tropical forests, where sunlight may not reach the ground as much. While body temperature is influenced by the lizard's amount of cover and its body position in its crevice, it does not seem to be influenced by sex, month, vegetation type, or any crevice characteristics.

=== Diet ===
Lizards in the genus Xenosaurus are exclusively found in crevices. Such a lifestyle suggests that the diets of these lizards might be opportunistic, and they eat whatever crawls or flies past or into their crevice. Their diet consists primarily of insects, but occasional lizard prey are taken. Their most frequent prey includes coleopterans (beetles), dipterans (flies), orthopterans (insects such as grasshoppers, crickets, weta, and locusts), and myriapods (terrestrial arthropods such as millipedes and centipedes). On the basis of number, they consume the most dipterans, but on the basis of volume, they consume the most orthopterans.

== Behavior ==
The Knob-scaled lizard is diurnal, meaning it is active during the day. Due to its diet of Orthoptera and Lepitdoptera larvae, Xenosaurus grandis is an ambush predator. It waits in its rocky crevice home and strikes with the element of surprise. It is a very solitary and aggressive species and will often fight with members of its own species over territory.

== Reproduction ==
Xenosaurus grandis and the rest of the xenosaurids are viviparous, which means offspring are birthed live rather than in eggs. Young are birthed after a 9-month gestation period. The majority of litters contain only three offspring, but litters ranging from two to seven offspring have also been observed. Male knob-scaled lizards reach maturity at 28 months, while females reach maturity a little later, at 32 months. It is also plausible to say that X. grandis do not produce young every year.

== Geographic range ==
There are five major population areas for the Xenosaurus grandis in Southern Mexico and Guatemala: central Veracruz, southern Oaxaca, north-central Oaxaca, the highlands of central Chiapas, and central Guatemala. The separate population areas have given rise to five subspecies of X. grandis. The five subspecies are X. g. grandis, X. g. agrenon, X. g. arboreus, X. g. rackhami, and X. g. sanmartinesis.

== Habitat ==
All the subspecies of Xenosaurus grandis live exclusively in rock crevices, which allows them to live in many habitats, including: xerophytic vegetation, tropical rainforests, cloud forests, oak forests, and tropical deciduous rainforests. The lizards have strong attachments to where they live, only living in 1-2 rock crevices for 95% of their entire lives.

== Conservation status ==
Currently Xenosaurus grandis is categorized as a vulnerable species according to the IUCN. The species was given this status because of fragmented populations, decreasing population size, and decreasing habitat quality and area, covering only 20,000 square km. The greatest threats to the survival of the species in the wild are habitat destruction and trapping for international pet trade. Eagles are the greatest natural predator of X. grandis, but they are not considered a threat to the survival of the species as a whole. Also, warmer temperatures in their habitat have been shown to cause greater mortality rates among the lizards, posing another potential threat to the species.

=== Temperature ===
Higher temperatures have been associated with higher mortality rates for X. grandis. In the 2003-2004 wet season of Southern Mexico and Guatemala (the habitat regions of the species), the average temperature was 24.3 C. That temperature was in the top 12% of highest recorded temperatures in the past 34 years of record keeping. The mortality rate for yearlings (the youngest age group) increased from 0.1923 to 0.6551 and for adult II (the oldest age group) increased from 0.3956 to 0.5676 for the 2002-2003 and 2003-2004 wet seasons respectively. If temperatures continue to increase, the survival of the species will be further threatened and currently 50% of wet seasons are warm enough to be considered to be unfavorable for the species.

=== Population and growth rates ===
As of 2004, X. grandis had a survival rate of 70.5% and a growth rate of 0.851. Even though the rates may appear to be low, in comparison to other lizard genera and families X. grandis is doing well. Currently the species is decreasing in population, which is thought to be primarily caused by human development destroying their habitat. If habitat destruction stops, the population should at least be stable, if not prosperous.
