= Carusia =

Carusia Temporal range: Late Cretaceous (late Campanian)

Scientific classification
- Domain: Eukaryota
- Kingdom: Animalia
- Phylum: Chordata
- Class: Reptilia
- Order: Squamata
- Clade: Carusioidea
- Genus: †Carusia; Borsuk-Bialynicka, 1985

Type species
- †Carolina intermedia Borsuk-Bialynicka, 1985

Extinct genus of lizards

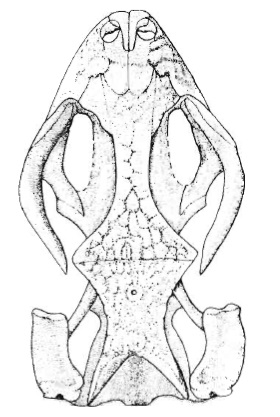

Carusia is an extinct genus of lizards from the Late Cretaceous of Mongolia. It is a close relative of the family Xenosauridae, which includes living knob-scaled lizards. Fossils of the type and only species Carusia intermedia come from the late-Campanian age Barun Goyot Formation and have been found in the Flaming Cliffs, Ukhaa Tolgod, and Kheerman Tsav fossil localities. Carusia was first described in 1985 under the name Carolina intermedia, but since the name Carolina was preoccupied by a genus of scarab beetles that had been named in 1880, it was renamed Carusia intermedia. Carusia had initially been known from fragmentary skull material, complicating efforts to determine its evolutionary relationships with other lizards; it had variously been described as an indeterminate scincomorph, a xenosaurid, or some other type of autarchoglossan lizard convergent with xenosaurids. However, the discovery of 35 complete skulls in the 1990s, three of which were described in a detailed 1998 monograph, revealed that Carusia was the sister taxon (closest relative) of Xenosauridae, compelling the authors of the monograph to create a new clade called Carusioidea to include both taxa.

Like xenosaurids, Carusia has a skull roof covered in large rounded osteoderms (bony plates embedded in the skin). It also shares with xenosaurids closely spaced orbits (eye sockets) with fused frontal bones between them, and a connection between the jugal and squamosal bones. However, many other features of its skull set it apart from xenosaurids, including the lack of a lacrimal bone, the wideness of the palatine bone, and the small size and high number of teeth in its jaws.
