= Saint Barts blind snake =

Conservation status
- Data Deficient (IUCN 3.1)

Scientific classification
- Kingdom: Animalia
- Phylum: Chordata
- Class: Reptilia
- Order: Squamata
- Suborder: Serpentes
- Family: Typhlopidae
- Genus: Antillotyphlops
- Species: A. annae

Binomial name
- Antillotyphlops annae (Breuil, 1999)

Synonyms
- Typhlops annae Breuil, 1999; Antillotyphlops annae — Hedges et al., 2014

Species of snake

The Saint Barts blind snake (Antillotyphlops annae) is a species of blind snake in the family Typhlopidae. The species is endemic to the Caribbean island of Saint Barthélemy, an overseas collectivity of France. The species was first described in 1999, and it is still not well known.

== Etymology ==
The specific name, annae, is in honor of Anne Breuil, who is the wife of the describer.

== Habitat ==
The preferred natural habitat of A. annae is forest.

== Reproduction ==
A. annae is oviparous.

== See also ==
- List of amphibians and reptiles of Saint Barthélemy
