= Xenostius =

Xenostius Temporal range: Early Cretaceous

Scientific classification
- Domain: Eukaryota
- Kingdom: Animalia
- Phylum: Chordata
- Class: Reptilia
- Order: Squamata
- Family: Xenosauridae
- Genus: †Xenostius
- Species: †X. futilus

Binomial name
- †Xenostius futilus Alifanov, 2019

Extinct genus of xenosaurid

Xenostius is an extinct genus of xenosaurid that inhabited Mongolia during the Cretaceous period. It contains a single species, X. futilus.
