= Exostinus =

Exostinus Temporal range: Maastrichtian–Oligocene

Scientific classification
- Kingdom: Animalia
- Phylum: Chordata
- Class: Reptilia
- Order: Squamata
- Suborder: Anguimorpha
- Family: Xenosauridae
- Genus: †Exostinus; Cope, 1873

Type species
- †Exostinus serratus Cope, 1873

Other species
- Exostinus lancensis Gilmore, 1928

Synonyms
- Harpagosaurus parvus Gilmore, 1928; Prionosaurus regularis Gilmore, 1928

Extinct genus of lizards

Exostinus is an extinct genus of xenosaurid lizard from the Late Cretaceous to Oligocene of the western United States. It was named in 1873 by Edward Drinker Cope as Exostinus serratus for jaw and skull bones found in the White River Formation of Colorado showing distinguishing cranial scutes. Material of E. serratus is also known from the Brule Formation, also Middle Oligocene in age, but in Wyoming. A second species, E. lancensis was named in 1928 by Charles W. Gilmore and is also known from skull and jaw bones, from the Maastrichtian Hell Creek, Lance and Fort Union Formations, and the Paleocene Tongue River Formation. Other species named by Gilmore are now considered synonyms of E. lancensis.
