= Xenosaurus agrenon =

Scientific classification
- Domain: Eukaryota
- Kingdom: Animalia
- Phylum: Chordata
- Class: Reptilia
- Order: Squamata
- Family: Xenosauridae
- Genus: Xenosaurus
- Species: X. agrenon

Binomial name
- Xenosaurus agrenon King & Thompson, 1968

Species of lizard

Xenosaurus agrenon, the mountain knob-scaled lizard, is a lizard found in Oaxaca of Mexico.
