= Xenosaurus platyceps =

Conservation status
- Endangered (IUCN 3.1)

Scientific classification
- Kingdom: Animalia
- Phylum: Chordata
- Class: Reptilia
- Order: Squamata
- Suborder: Anguimorpha
- Family: Xenosauridae
- Genus: Xenosaurus
- Species: X. platyceps

Binomial name
- Xenosaurus platyceps King & Thompson, 1968

Species of lizard

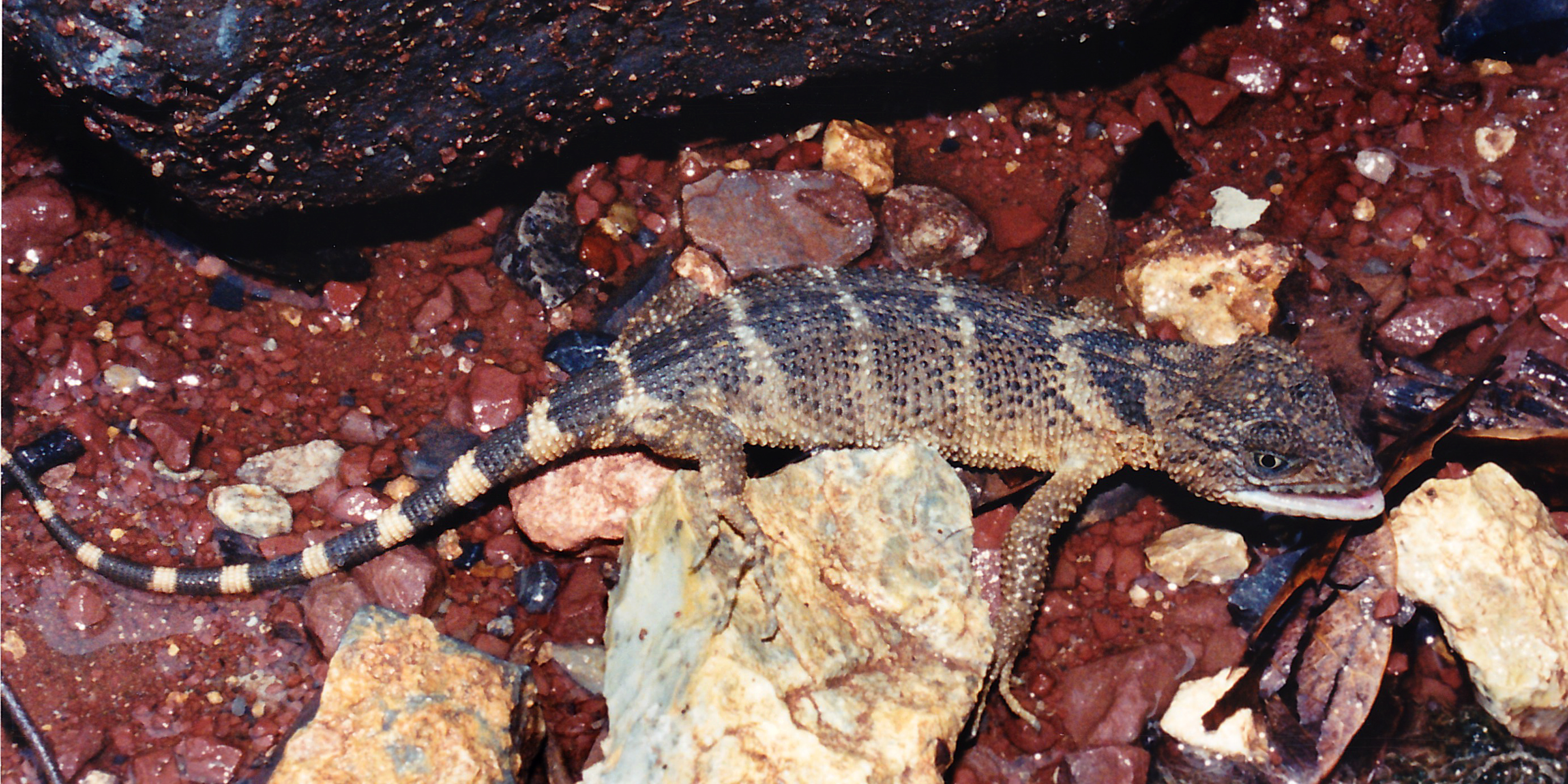
Flathead knob-scaled lizard (Xenosaurus platyceps) from the vicinity of the type locality, west of Ciudad Victoria, Tamaulipas, Mexico

Xenosaurus platyceps, the flathead knob-scaled lizard, is a lizard found in the Sierra Madre Oriental of Mexico. Its natural habitat is dry scrub forest and oak savanna. The species is endangered due to habitat fragmentation for the development of tourism and agriculture as well as predation by feral cats. Currently, the flathead knob-scaled lizard does not live in a protected area. Temperature plays a large part in growth rates of X. platyceps along with genetic factors. It has been found that the flathead knob-scaled lizards living in lower elevation, in a more tropical environment, grow virtually twice as fast as those from higher elevations, in a more temperate environment.
