= Cyrtodactylus cavernicolus =

Conservation status
- Least Concern (IUCN 3.1)

Scientific classification
- Kingdom: Animalia
- Phylum: Chordata
- Class: Reptilia
- Order: Squamata
- Suborder: Gekkota
- Family: Gekkonidae
- Genus: Cyrtodactylus
- Species: C. cavernicolus

Binomial name
- Cyrtodactylus cavernicolus Inger & King, 1962
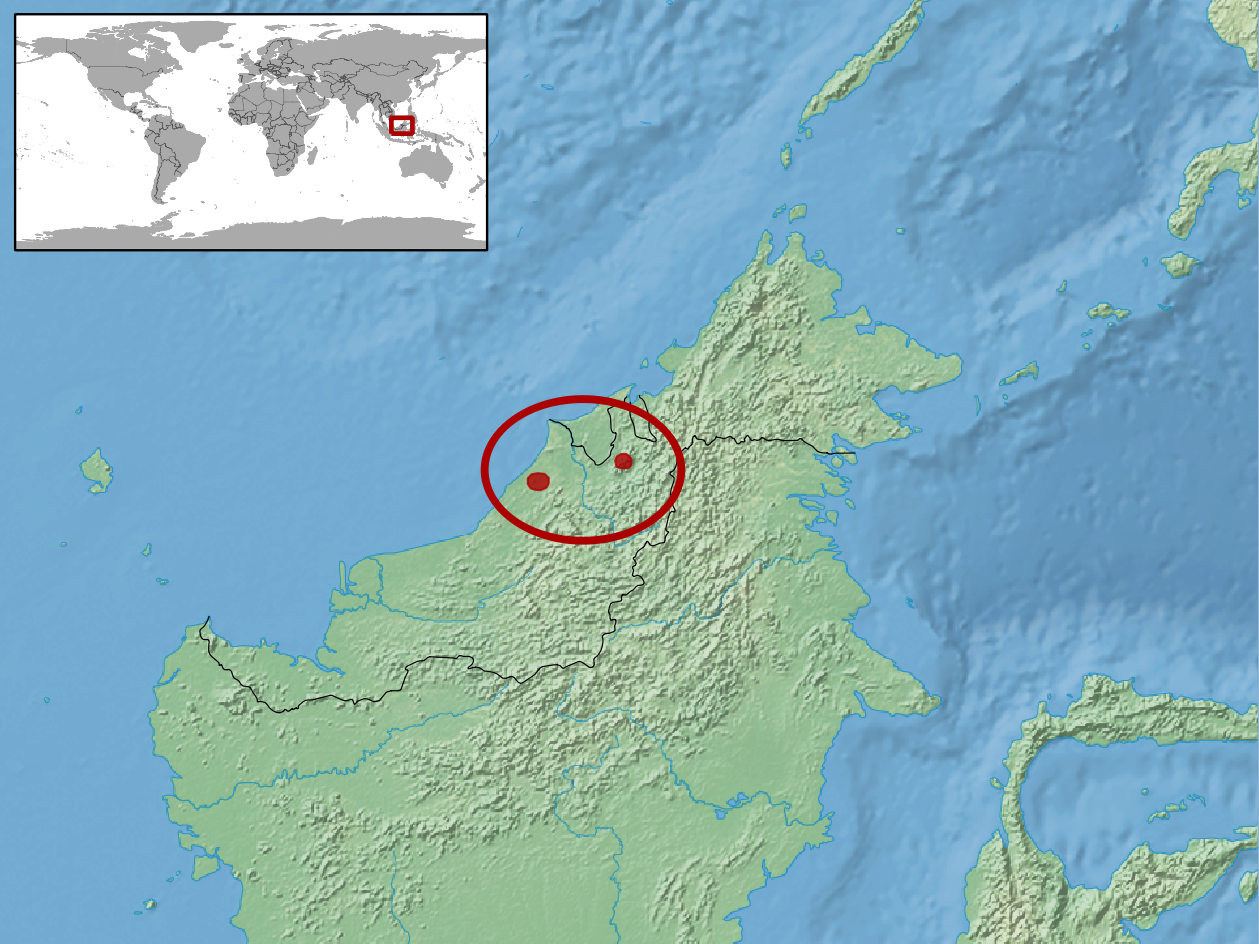

Species of lizard

Cyrtodactylus cavernicolus is a species of gecko that is endemic to Sarawak.
