= Sphaerodactylus parvus =

Conservation status
- Least Concern (IUCN 3.1)

Scientific classification
- Kingdom: Animalia
- Phylum: Chordata
- Class: Reptilia
- Order: Squamata
- Suborder: Gekkota
- Family: Sphaerodactylidae
- Genus: Sphaerodactylus
- Species: S. parvus

Binomial name
- Sphaerodactylus parvus King, 1962

Species of lizard

Sphaerodactylus parvus, the Anguilla Bank geckolet, is a species of lizard belonging to the family Sphaerodactylidae, the least geckos or sphaeros. This species is endemic to the Anguilla Bank of islands in the Lesser Antilles, which comprises Anguilla, Saint Martin, and Saint Barthélemy.

== Taxonomy ==
Sphaerodactylus parvus was first formally described in 1962 as a subspecies of S. macrolepis, S. macrolepis parvus, by the American herpetologist Wayne King with its type locality given as 2.35 miles west and .25 miles north of Philipsburg in Sint Maarten. In 2001 Robert Powell and Robert W. Henderson changed its taxonomic status from a subspecies to a species, S. parvus. Sphaerodactylus was formerly included in the family Gekkonidae but in 1954 Garth Underwood proposed the family Sphaerodactylidae, This family is classified within the infraorder Gekkota the sole extant taxon within the clade Gekkonomorpha of the order Squamata, which includes the lizards and snakes.

== Etymology ==
Sphaerodactylus parvus is a member of the genus Sphaerodactylus, a name which is a combination of the Greek sphaira, meaning "a ball", or sphairion, which means "a little ball", with dactylos, meaning "finger", seemingly an allusion to round tips to the toes. The specific name, parvus, means "small" in Latin.

== Description ==
Sphaerodactylus parvus was separated from S. marolpeis because the haor bearing organs are only located on the dorsal scales; its small size, 24mm maximum Snout–vent length compared to 35mm in S. macrolepis; the higher number of scale rows in its mid body; and the lack of clear sexual dimorphism in colour and pattern.

== Distribution and habitat ==
Sphaerodactylus parvus is endemic to i the islands of the Anguilla Bank in the northern Lesser Antilles and is found on Anguilla, Collectivity of Saint Martin , Sint Maarten and Saint Barthélemy. On Anguilla this species is typically found in coastal scrub near rocky terrain while on Saint Martin it prefers higher, wetter habitats.
