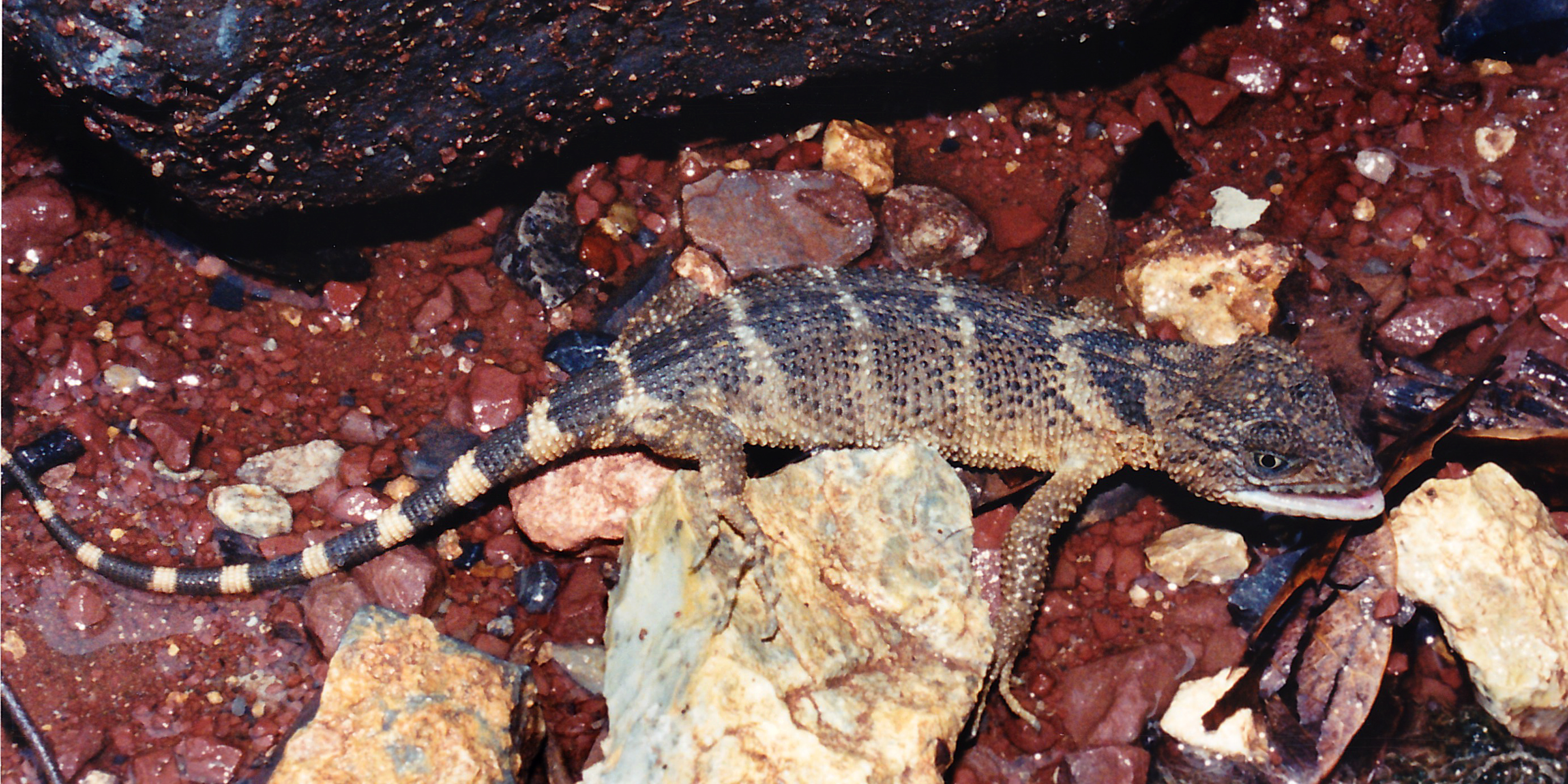
- Xenosaurus platyceps

Scientific classification
- Kingdom: Animalia
- Phylum: Chordata
- Class: Reptilia
- Order: Squamata
- Suborder: Anguimorpha
- Family: Xenosauridae
- Genus: Xenosaurus; W. Peters, 1861

= Xenosaurus =

Genus of lizards

Xenosaurus is a genus of lizards; it is the only extant genus in the family Xenosauridae, with 14 species recognized. Also known commonly as knob-scaled lizards, species of Xenosaurus can found in Mexico and Guatemala. These lizards are known to feed on a variety of crawling and flying insects. This genus mostly eats orthopterans, coleopterans (beetles), dipterans, and myriapods.

== Species ==
The following 14 species are recognized as being valid.

- Xenosaurus agrenon King & F.G. Thompson, 1968
- Xenosaurus arboreus Lynch & H.M. Smith, 1965
- Xenosaurus fractus Nieto-Montes de Oca, Sánchez-Vega & Durán-Fuentes, 2018
- Xenosaurus grandis (Gray, 1856)
- Xenosaurus manipulus Nieto-Montes de Oca, Castresana-Villanueva, Canseco-Márquez & Campbell, 2022
- Xenosaurus mendozai Nieto-Montes de Oca et al., 2013
- Xenosaurus newmanorum Taylor, 1949
- Xenosaurus penai Pérez Ramos, L. de la Riva & Campbell, 2000
- Xenosaurus phalaroanthereon Nieto-Montes de Oca, Campbell & Flores-Villela, 2001
- Xenosaurus platyceps King & Thompson, 1968
- Xenosaurus rackhami L.C. Stuart, 1941
- Xenosaurus rectocollaris H.M. Smith & Iverson, 1993
- Xenosaurus sanmartinensis Werler & Shannon, 1961 – San Martin knob-scaled lizard
- Xenosaurus tzacualtipantecus Woolrich-Piña & G.R. Smith, 2012

Nota bene: A binomial authority in parentheses indicates that the species was originally described in a genus other than Xenosaurus.
