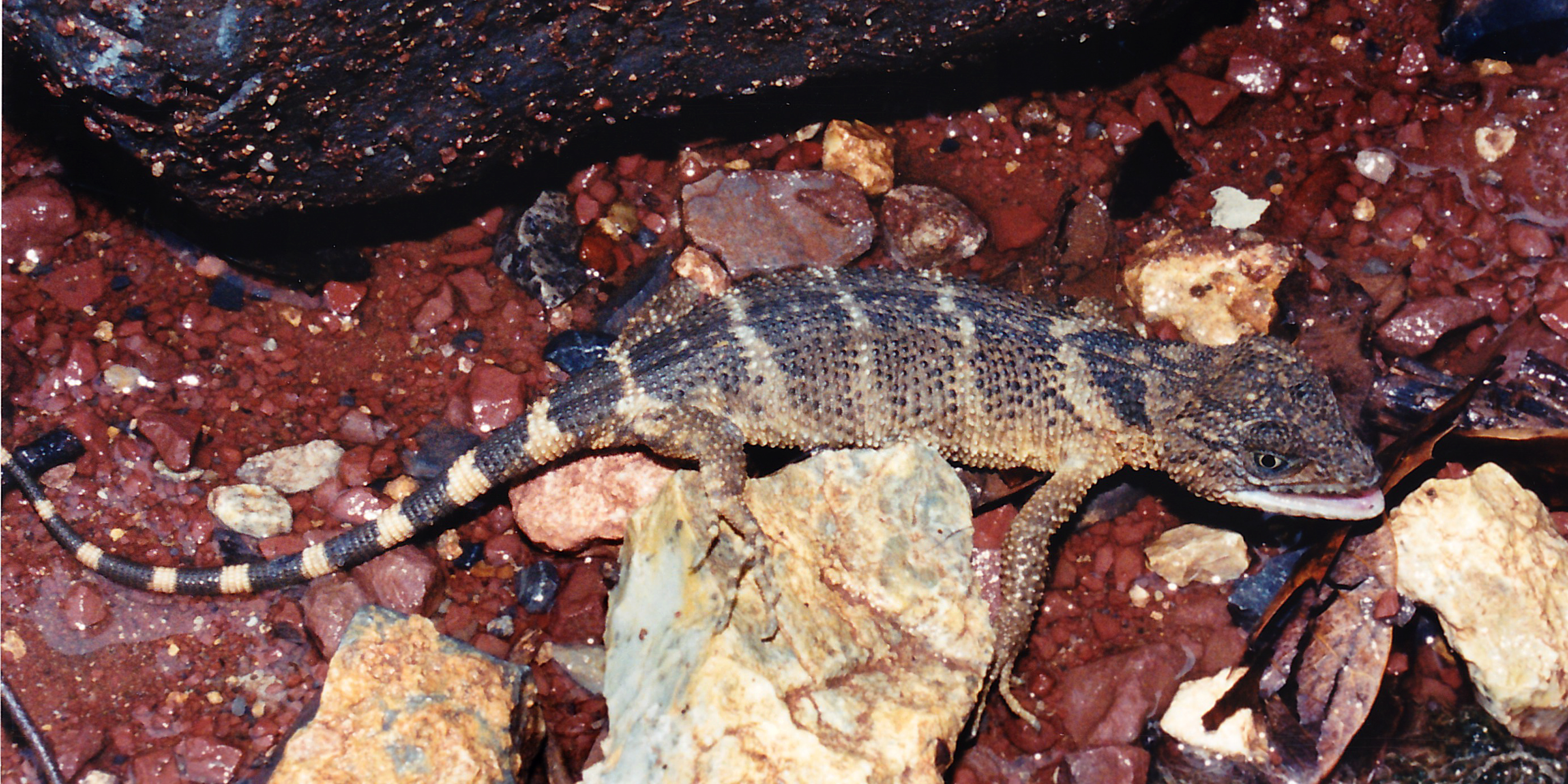
- Xenosaurus platyceps

Scientific classification
- Kingdom: Animalia
- Phylum: Chordata
- Class: Reptilia
- Order: Squamata
- Clade: Carusioidea
- Family: Xenosauridae; Cope, 1886

Genera
- †Exostinus; †Restes; Xenosaurus; †Xenostius; †Blutwurstia

= Xenosauridae =

Xenosauridae Temporal range: Aptian–Holocene

Family of lizards

Xenosauridae is a family of anguimorph lizards whose only living representative is the genus Xenosaurus, which is native to Central America. Xenosauridae also includes the extinct genera Exostinus and Restes. Also known as knob-scaled lizards, they have rounded, bumpy scales and osteoderms. Most living species prefer humid, rocky habitats, although they are widespread within their native regions, with some inhabiting semi-arid scrub environments. They are carnivorous or insectivorous, and give birth to live young.

Shinisaurus, the Chinese crocodile lizard, was once also regarded as a member of Xenosauridae, but most recent studies of the evolutionary relationships of anguimorphs consider Shinisaurus to be more closely related to monitor lizards and helodermatids than to Xenosaurus. Xenosauridae is part of a larger clade or evolutionary grouping called Carusioidea, which, in addition to xenosaurids, includes the extinct genus Carusia.

The oldest xenosaurids are known from the Cretaceous, including the Late Cretaceous of North America and Early Cretaceous of Asia.
