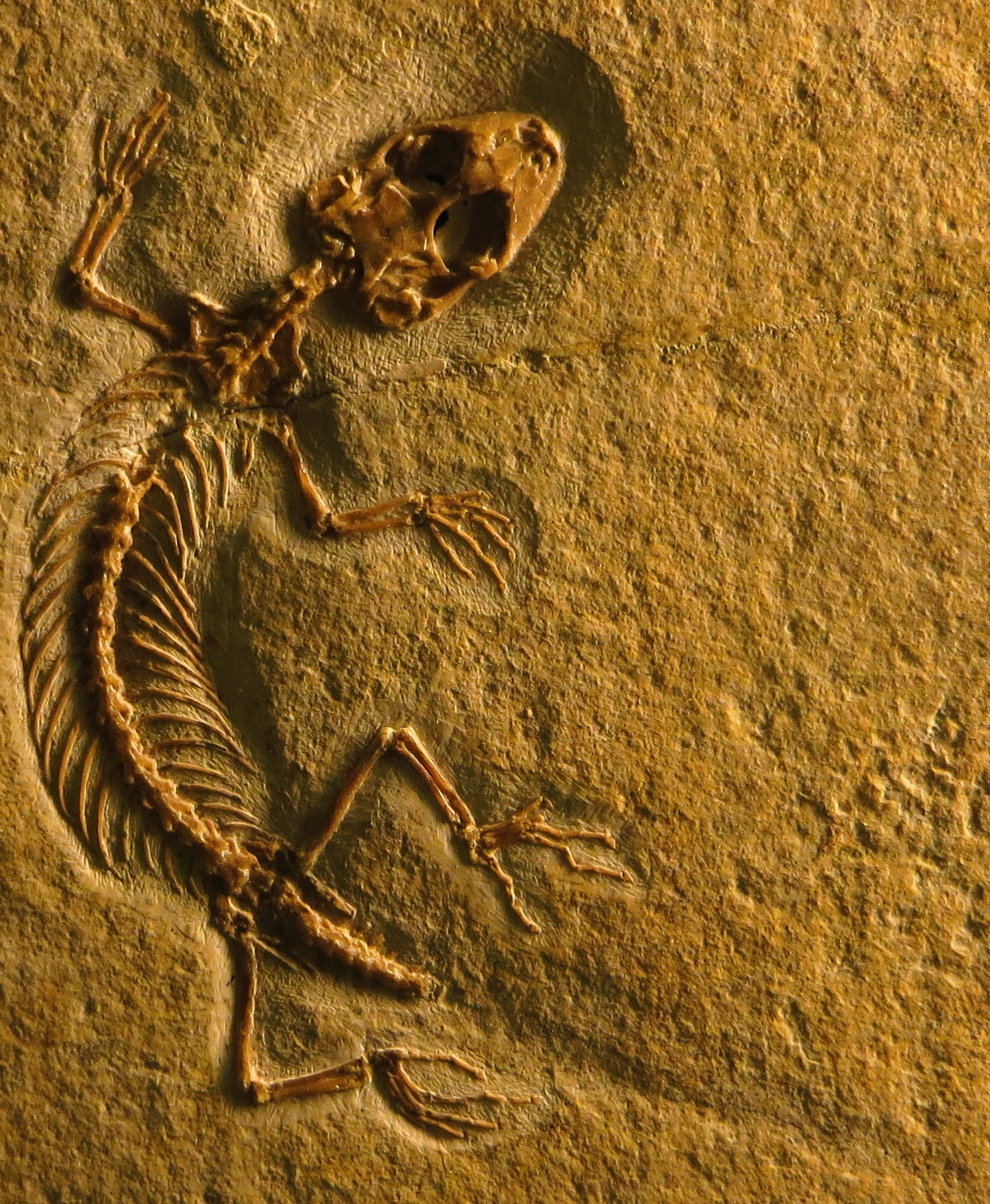
- Type and only specimen of E. schroederi

Scientific classification
- Kingdom: Animalia
- Phylum: Chordata
- Class: Reptilia
- Order: Squamata
- Family: †Eichstaettisauridae
- Genus: †Eichstaettisaurus; Kuhn, 1958

Type species
- †Eichstaettisaurus schroederi (Broili, 1938)

Other species
- †E. gouldi Evans et al., 2004

Synonyms
- E. schroederi: Ardeosaurus? schröderi Broili, 1938; Broilisaurus schröderi Hoffstetter, 1953 (preoccupied); Eichstaettisaurus digitatellus Cocude-Michel, 1963 (in part)

= Eichstaettisaurus =

Eichstaettisaurus Temporal range: Tithonian-Albian

Genus of lizard from the Late Jurassic and Early Cretaceous periods

Eichstaettisaurus (meaning "Eichstätt lizard") is a genus of lizards from the Late Jurassic and Early Cretaceous of Germany, Spain, and Italy. With a flattened head, forward-oriented and partially symmetrical feet, and tall claws, Eichstaettisaurus bore many adaptations to a climbing lifestyle approaching those of geckos. The type species, E. schroederi, is among the oldest and most complete members of the Squamata, being known by one specimen originating from the Tithonian-aged Solnhofen Limestone of Germany. A second species, E. gouldi, was described from another skeleton found in the Matese Mountains of Italy. Despite being very similar to E. schroederi, it lived much later, during the Albian stage. Fossils of both species show exceptional preservation due to deposition in low-oxygen marine environments.

Initially named as a species of the genus Ardeosaurus by Ferdinand Broili in 1938, E. schroederi has had a convoluted taxonomic history. It was initially recognized as a relative of night lizards until research in the 1960s identified it and Ardeosaurus as geckoes. However, phylogenetic analyses conducted in the 1990s suggested that it was closer to the ancestor of all squamates. Various conflicting positions were found until the advent of analyses incorporating more species and better data, which resolved E. schroederi as a close relative of geckoes in the Gekkonomorpha. However, the position of Ardeosaurus in relation to E. schroederi remains uncertain: one species, A. digitatellus, has been recovered as its close relative in some analyses, but the other species A. brevipes has been found to be more distantly related.

== Discovery and naming ==
=== E. schroederi ===
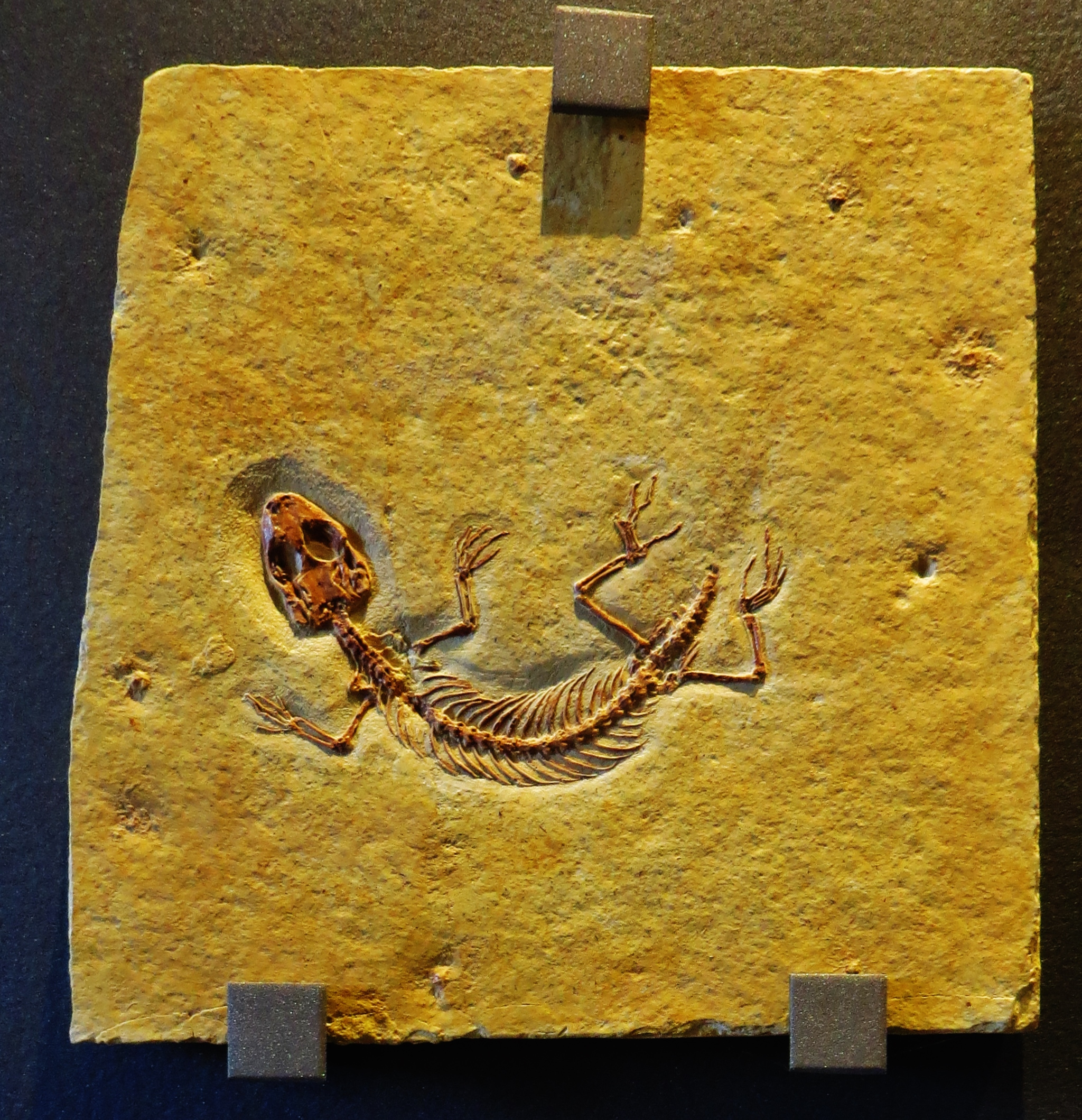
Type specimen of E. schroederi in the Jura Museum, Eichstätt

In 1938, Ferdinand Broili described an exquisitely preserved specimen of lizard, preserved top-side-up, from Jurassic-aged rock deposits in the municipality of Wintershof, Eichstätt, Germany. The specimen came into the possession of the Bavarian State Collection of Paleontology and Historical Geology (BSPG), where it was prepared by L. Haimerl. It consists of a nearly-complete skeleton, albeit with a crushed skull, a tail missing the tail after the fifth vertebra (probably the result of amputation and replacement by cartilage), and several vertebrae preserved only as impressions (but their presence could still be verified by the associated ribs). A counterslab to the specimen also exists. Today, the rock deposits are known to belong to the Altmühltal Formation, and the specimen and its counterslab are stored under the accession numbers BSPG 1937 I 1a and 1b.

Although he was unable to examine it first-hand, Broili noted from Christian Erich Hermann von Meyer's description of the type specimen of Ardeosaurus brevipes that it bore similarities to this specimen, but also that they had important differences in snout and frontal bone shape, as well as vertebral counts. However, he hesitated to create a new genus due to the preservational state of the skull. Thus, he assigned it to the genus Ardeosaurus with reservations as a new species, A.? schröderi, named after his colleague J. Schröder. (The current specific name is schroederi: by Article 32.5.2.1 of the International Code of Zoological Nomenclature, umlauts in German names published before 1985 must be deleted and be replaced with an "e" inserted as the next letter.)

Robert Hoffstetter formally recognized the distinction between A.? schroederi and A. brevipes in 1953, and established a new generic name, Broilisaurus. However, Oskar Kuhn had already named a stegocephalian amphibian with the same name in 1938; thus, in 1958, he established another generic name for the species, Eichstättisaurus. (Again, due to the ICZN, the current generic name is Eichstaettisaurus.) In 1963, Marguerite Cocude-Michel opined that E. schroederi really represented the same species as Homoeosaurus digitatellus, which had previously been named as a non-type species of Homoeosaurus in 1914 by N.M. Grier. Thus, she created the new combination Eichstaettisaurus digitatellus.

Contrary to Cocude-Michel, Hoffstetter identified digitatellus as a member of Ardeosaurus separate from Eichstaettisaurus in 1964. Even though Cocude-Michel was aware of Hoffstetter's paper, in 1965 she reiterated her argument and made no attempt to address Hoffstetter. Hoffstetter responded in 1966, calling Cocude-Michel's synonymy "unbearable". He noted that it would entail the revision of the diagnostic characteristics of Eichstatettisaurus to a point where it would be practically indistinguishable from Ardeosaurus, which would contradict her family-level separation of the two. Subsequent literature has retained Eichstaettisaurus schroederi and Ardeosaurus digitatellus as separate, although they received little attention until Tiago Simões and colleagues published a redescription of both in 2017.

=== E. gouldi ===
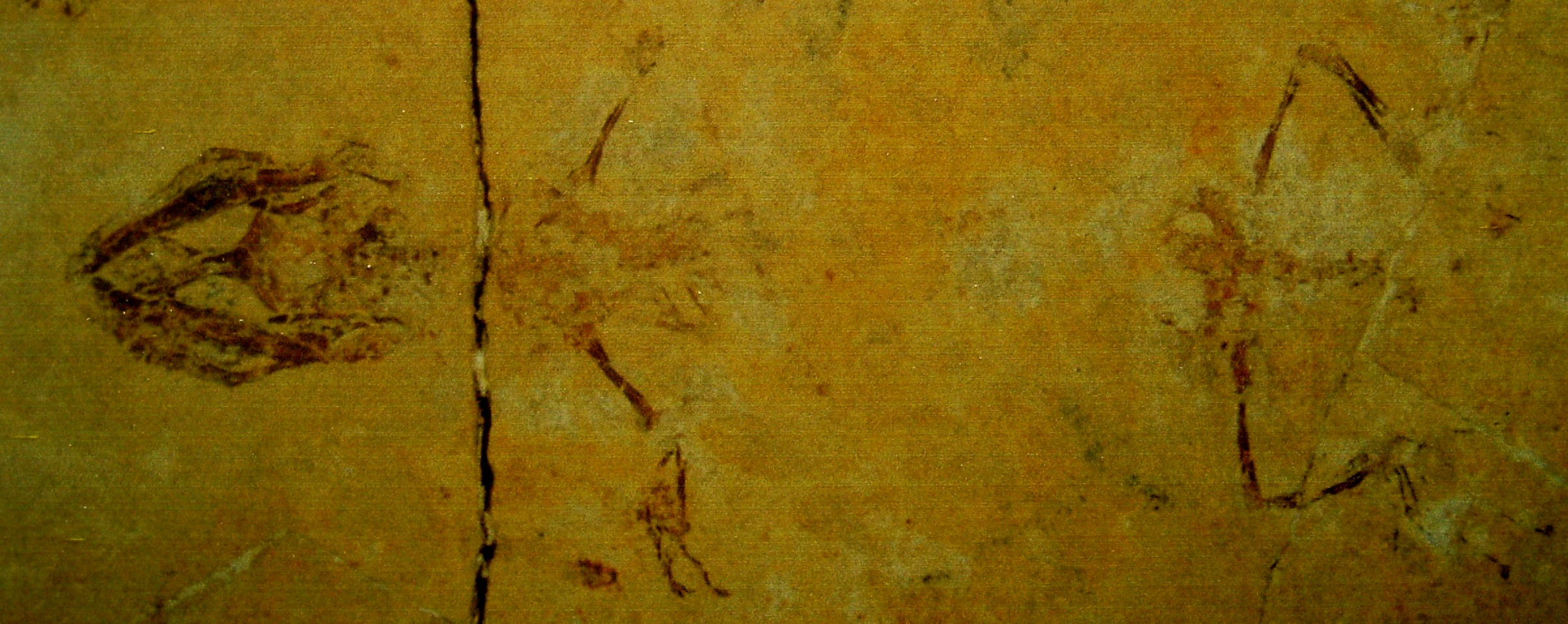
Type specimen of E. gouldi

For many years, Eichstaettisaurus was known from the single specimen of E. schroederi until Cretaceous-aged remains were found elsewhere in Europe. In 2000, Susan Evans and colleagues described a small lizard specimen in the Berriasian–Valanginian aged locality of Montsec in Catalonia, Spain. Despite its poor preservation, the specimen was clearly distinct from the more common lizard in the locality, Meyasaurus; Evans and colleagues suggested that it held affinities to Eichstaettisaurus.

In 2004, Evans and colleagues reported even younger remains of Eichstaettisaurus, which originated from the Albian-aged Pietraroja Plattenkalk in the locality of Pietraroia, which is located in the Matese Mountains of southern Italy. A specimen catalogued as MPN 19457 formed the type specimen of a new species, E. gouldi, which they named after the late biologist Stephen Jay Gould; it is a skeleton preserved bottom-side-up, which includes the skull and parts of the vertebral column and limbs. A second specimen consists of a disarticulated skull, which is preserved as part of the gut contents of an indeterminate rhynchocephalian catalogued as MPN A01/82. Both specimens are stored in the Museum of Palaeontology at the University of Naples (MPN).

== Description ==
Eichstaettisaurus was a relatively small animal. E. schroederi had a snout-vent length (measured from the tip of the snout to the opening of the cloaca) of 94 mm (3.7 in), while E. gouldi had a snout-vent length of 56 mm (2.2 in).

=== Skull ===
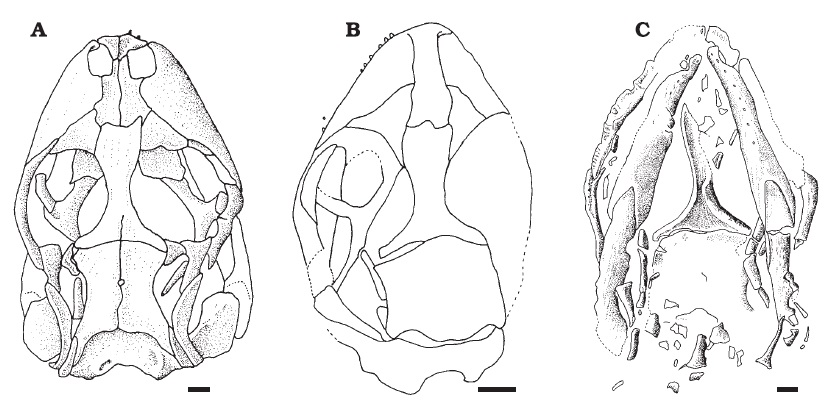
Comparison of skulls of E. schroederi (A), unnamed Spanish specimen (B), and E. gouldi (C)

Eichstaettisaurus can be identified by flattened skulls with short, blunt, and rounded snouts. E. schroederi had large nostrils. The tooth-bearing bones of the snout, the premaxilla and the maxilla, were likely connected by a band of soft tissue in E. schroederi. The premaxilla had 6 or 7 teeth in E. gouldi, but the number in E. schroederi is unknown; the maxilla had approximately 22 teeth in E. schroederi, and at least 30 in E. gouldi. The teeth of both species were small, narrow, conical, and single-cusped; they had a pleurodont implantation, meaning that they were fused to the inner side of the jawbone. Like Ardeosaurus, both species lacked the lacrimal bone, usually a part of the eye socket. Also in the eye socket, the postfrontal and postorbital bones were separate unlike Ardeosaurus, and the rearward projection of the latter bones were relatively wide. In E. schroederi, the contact between these bones was further forward than most lizards. The squamosal bones were slender and projected downwards to meet the quadrate bones, as in most lizards; unlike the Iguania and Teiidae, however, they lacked upward projections. Living geckoes lack the postorbital and squamosal bones, and they also have relatively shorter jugal bones than Eichstaettisaurus. On the palate of E. schroederi, the ectopterygoid bones overlapped the pterygoid bones at their rear.

Unlike A. brevipes, E. schroederi lacked bone ornamentation and osteoderms on the skull roof. In both species, the frontal bones were fused and narrower between the eye sockets than they were at the front. The downward projections on the frontals known as subolfactory processes were well-developed in both species, but met at the midline only in E. schroederi. The suture between the frontal and parietal bones was convex in E. schroederi and concave in E. gouldi, unlike Ardeosaurus where it was straight. E. gouldi and most other lizards have fused parietal bones, but they were paired and unfused in E. schroederi. The parietals of both species lacked rearward projections and nuchal fossae. In E. schroederi, the outer edges of the parietals curved inwards, and the rearward projections known as the supratemporal processes were short, widely separated, and bore depressions. Also in E. schroederi, a pair of crests were present on the supraoccipital bone of the braincase, which were likely imprinted by the semicircular canals due to the skull's reduced ossification.

=== Vertebrae and ribs ===
Compared to most iguanian, gekkotan, and scincomorphan lizards, which generally have 24–26 vertebrae in front of the sacrum (or hip), E. schroederi had 31, including 7 neck vertebrae and approximately 24 back vertebrae. E. gouldi had 6–7 neck vertebrae, and an unknown number of back vertebrae. In E. gouldi, the second (axis) and third neck vertebrae were connected to the next by elements known as intercentra. In E. schroederi, most of the neck vertebrae lacked cervical ribs, save for the last two. The upward-projecting neural spines on the back vertebrae were small, and the last few back vertebrae lacked ribs in the vein of lumbar vertebrae. Zygosphene-zygantrum articulations are present on the back vertebrae of both species. The ribs were single-headed and had circular articulating surfaces. In E. gouldi, the centra (main bodies) of the tail vertebrae were broad, cylindrical, amphicoelous (concave on both ends), and bore strongly developed transverse processes.

=== Limbs and limb girdles ===
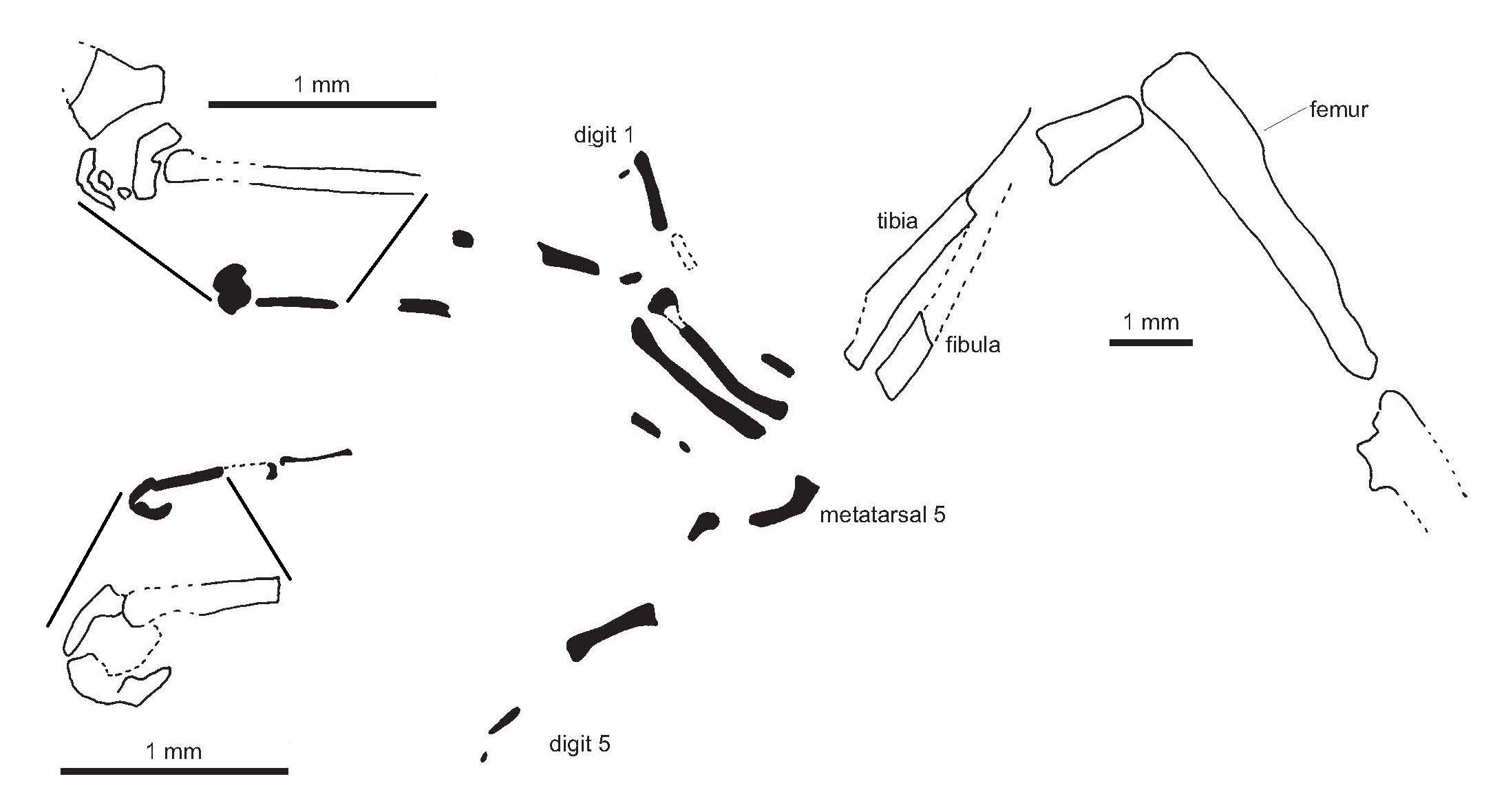
Foot of E. gouldi, with enlargements showing breakage of claws

Eichstaettisaurus had a well-developed acromion process, or the attachment for the clavicle, on the scapula (shoulder blade). The clavicles of E. schroederi did not curve forward, unlike most members of the Autarchoglossa, and also lacked rearward projections. As in Ardeosaurus, both species of Eichstaettisaurus had relatively stout forelimbs. In E. schroederi, the olecranon process of the ulna was well-developed. In E. gouldi, the carpal bones were likely not fully ossified. The five-digited hand of E. schroederi bore 2, 3, 4, 5, and 3 phalanges (finger bones) on each digit; the second-to-last phalanges from the tips were relatively long. E. gouldi appears to have had 4 phalanges on the fourth digit, and its claws were short, deep, and sharp, with well-developed flexor tubercles.

In the pelvis of E. schroederi, the expansion of the pubes into the fused pubic apron was relatively narrow; the pubes also lacked the forward projections known as the pubic tubercles. The ischia were enlarged and contacted each other extensively, and the rear expansion of the blade of the ilium was long. Both Eichstaettisaurus species had stout hindlimbs similar in length to the forelimbs. The femur had a straight shaft, unlike most other lizards where it is sigmoidal. In the foot, the first metatarsal bone was slightly shorter than the second to fourth metatarsal bones. Unusually, the fifth metatarsal bone was much shorter and hooked. In E. schroederi, the foot was five-digited like the hands, with 2, 3, 4, 5, and 4 phalanges on each digit, and the second-last phalanges and claws were similar. E. schroederi shared two features of the foot claws with the living Tokay gecko: the claws had expanded bottom ends; and the articulations between phalanges were simple concave-convex joints, instead of bicondylar (i.e. based on two rounded projections on the ends of the phalanges), unlike most other lizards.

== Classification ==
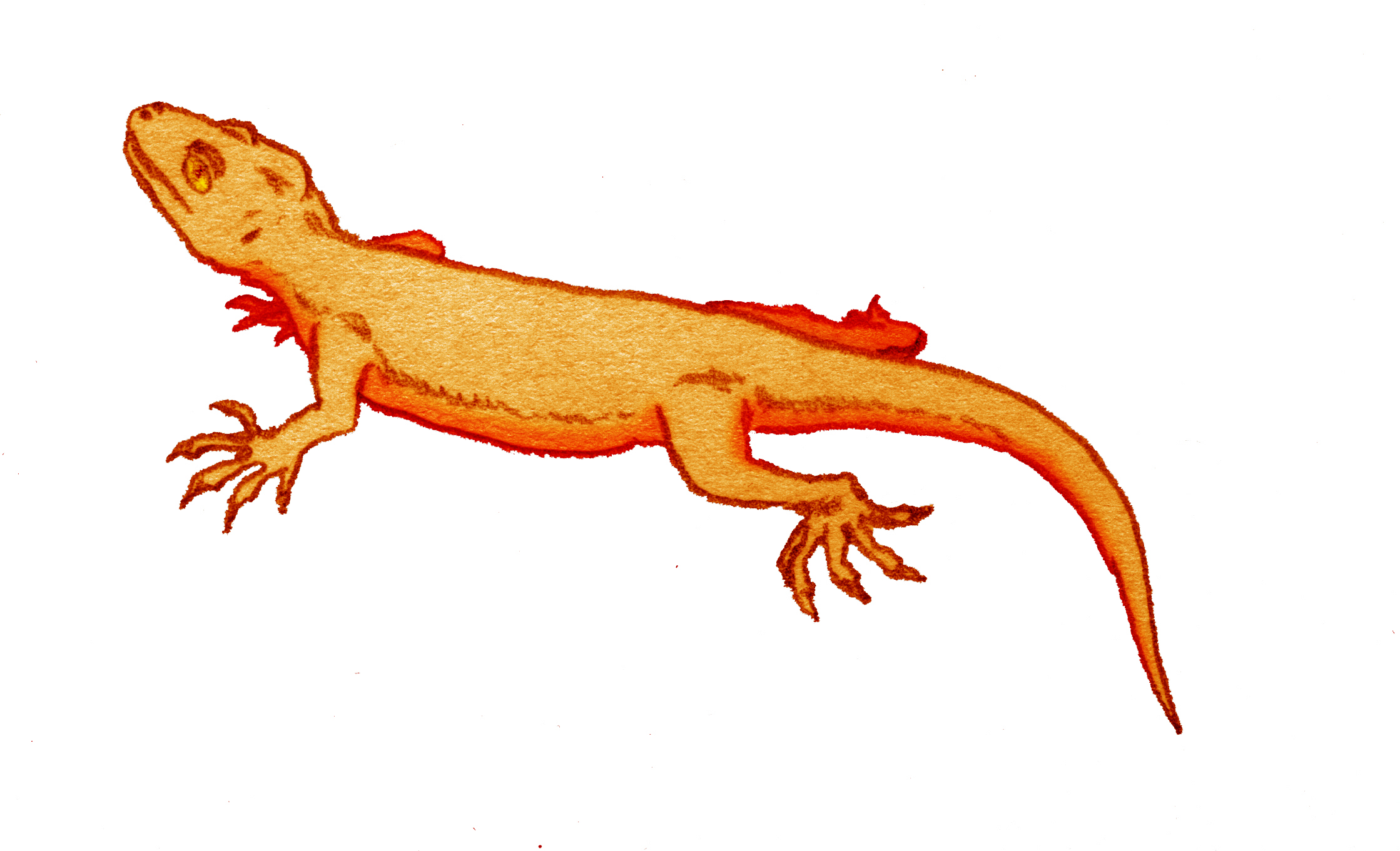
Ardeosaurus has been found to either be closely related or distantly related to Eichstaettisaurus in various analyses

The phylogenetic history of Eichstaettisaurus has been tumultuous like that of Ardeosaurus, which has been a consequence of both incomplete data and its primitive form. von Meyer did not provide a placement for Ardeosaurus when he named the genus; Richard Lydekker and Karl Alfred von Zittel placed it and Homoeosaurus in the Rhynchocephalia, Baron Franz Nopcsa placed Ardeosaurus as a close relative of the skinks, and Charles Camp placed it close to the Gekkonidae. Based on the well-developed rims of the eye sockets and supratemporal fenestrae on the skull in the type specimen of E. schroederi, Broili concurred with Nopcsa's conclusion in 1938. Within the Scincomorpha, he noted that the amphicoelous vertebrae of Ardeosaurus (including E. schroederi) best resembled that of the Xantusiidae (night lizards), as most other skinks have procoelous (convex on the rear surface) vertebrae.

Upon separating schroederi into the genus Broilisaurus, Hoffstetter retained it within the Xantusiidae in 1953, but he noticed that its skull curiously resembled those of geckoes. Since xantusiids and geckoes were then placed on the two major recognized branches of lizards, Autarchoglossa and Ascalabota, Hoffstetter speculated that it was close to the ancestral stock of lizards. Upon renaming it to Eichstaettisaurus, Kuhn established the family Eichstaettisauridae, still in the Xantusiidae. In 1961 and then 1963, Cocude-Michel concurred with Camp that Ardeosauridae and Eichstaettisauridae were actually geckoes and not xantusiids, based on major differences in the postcranial skeleton, and placed both in the Gekkonomorpha. Hoffstetter accepted this identification in 1966, as did Richard Estes in 1983.

However, phylogenetic analyses conducted by Victor Reynoso in 1996 (not published), Evans and Luis Javier Barbadillo in 1998 and 1999, and Evans and Daniel Chure in 1998 suggested that both Eichstaettisaurus and Ardeosaurus were much more basal (early-diverging) squamates. Along with Bavarisaurus, Scandensia, and Hoyalacerta, the two were found to fall outside the crown group of Squamata. This would make them stem-squamates, i.e. not descendants of the common ancestor of all living squamates. However, in the 1999 analysis, Evans and Barbadillo acknowledged that the position of Eichstaettisaurus was unstable due to missing data (only 44% of the characteristics used in their analysis could be coded for it), and one of their phylogenetic trees placed it as the sister group to Scleroglossa among crown squamates. Evans and colleagues found E. gouldi to be the sister group of E. schroederi in 2004, and recovered a similar position for both.

Subsequent phylogenetic analyses from Evans and colleagues found a variety of conflicting positions for Eichstaettisaurus and Ardeosaurus. In 2005, Evans and Yuan Wang conducted two analyses, one based on a 1998 analysis by Michael Lee and the other based on Evans and Chure's 1998 analysis, but they added Dalinghosaurus, Dorsetisaurus, and Parviraptor to both. One found Eichstaettisaurus as the sister group of a group containing Xantusiidae, Gekkonidae, Pygopodidae, and Amphisbaenia, with Ardeosaurus being close to Lacertidae and Teiioidea; the other united Eichstaettisaurus with Dalinghosaurus and the Xenosauridae in the Anguimorpha, with Ardeosaurus as the sister group of Iguania. After Evans, Wang, and Chun Li added Yabeinosaurus to the same analyses, one found Eichstaettisaurus, Ardeosaurus, Yabeinosaurus, and Parviraptor to form the sister group to the Scleroglossa, while the other recovered Ardeosaurus as a stem-squamate and Eichstaettisaurus, Hoyalacerta, Parviraptor, and Scandensia to form a group among Scleroglossa.

A 2006 phylogenetic analysis by Jack Conrad and Mark Norell likewise found Eichstaettisaurus as close to the Scleroglossa. In 2008, Conrad published a large phylogenetic analysis of squamates including 222 taxa and 363 characteristics, which attempted to address the problem of incomplete taxon sampling (i.e. an insufficient number of included taxa) causing phylogenetic instability. To include Eichstaettisaurus, he combined data from E. schroederi and E. gouldi. He found that both Eichstaettisaurus and Ardeosaurus, along with Bavarisaurus, were part of the stem group of Scleroglossa. Along with the crown group of Scleroglossa, they comprised the Scincogekkonomorpha. Arnau Bolet and Evans conducted two analyses based on Conrad's analysis, for the 2010 and 2012 descriptions of Pedrerasaurus and Jucaraseps, and recovered similar positions for Eichstaettisaurus. However, the former contained a polytomy since the relationship between Iguania, Pedrerasaurus, a group containing Ardeosaurus, Yabeinosaurus, and Sakurasaurus, and all other squamates could not be resolved.

Jacques Gauthier and colleagues published another large phylogenetic analysis in 2012, containing 192 taxa and 976 characteristics. Like Conrad, they also combined data from E. schroederi and E. gouldi. They recovered a more derived position for Eichstaettisaurus as part of the stem group of Gekkota, along with the unnamed specimen AMNH FR 21444; in particular, they noted that its limb proportions strongly resembled gekkotans. After adding Ardeosaurus digitatellus and re-coding Eichstaettisaurus to only include data from E. schroederi, Simões and colleagues found E. schroederi in a similar position, albeit in a polytomy with A. digitatellus and AMNH FR 21444. They identified a number of gekkotan traits: the paired parietals; the closed Meckelian groove on the lower jaw; the small, conical maxillary teeth; the short, blunt snout and flattened skull; the ectopterygoids overlapping the pterygoids; the two pterygoids and palatine bones being widely separated; the wide suture dividing the pterygoids and palatines from each other; and the lumbar-like vertebrae.

In 2018, Mateusz Tałanda added Ardeosaurus brevipes to Gauthier and colleagues' analysis (but did not include the revisions of Simões and colleagues). He found Eichstaettisaurus in the same location alongside Norellius, but also recovered A. brevipes as a scincomorph closely related to skinks (in contrast to the stem-gekkotan position of A. digitatellus). Despite their different phylogenetic positions, Tałanda observed that the two species only differ by the widths of their parietals. He speculated that incomplete data due to the poor preservation of A. digitatellus could have influenced these results, and thus he retained it in the genus Ardeosaurus. Another analysis conducted by Simões, Tałanda, and colleagues in 2018, this time using the revised data of Simões and colleagues, found a similar position for E. schroederi but a more basal one for A. brevipes in the Autarchoglossa. In 2019, Vladimir Alifanov considered both Eichstaettisaurus and Ardeosaurus as scincomorphs closely related to Carusia but not to Xenosauridae, but did not perform a phylogenetic analysis.

Below, phylogenetic trees from the two major phylogenetic analyses including Eichstaettisaurus are shown: one based on that of Conrad (Bolet & Evans, 2012, with relationships within Scleroglossa from Conrad, 2008), and one based on that of Gauthier and colleagues (Simões and colleagues, 2018).

Topology A: Bolet & Evans (2012) with Scleroglossa from Conrad (2008)

- Squamata
  - Iguanomorpha
  - Scincogekkonomorpha
    - Ardeosaurus
    - - - Bavarisaurus
        - Parviraptor (Bolet & Evans, 2012)
      - - Eichstaettisaurus
        - - Jucaraseps
          - - - Sakurasaurus
              - Yabeinosaurus
            - Scleroglossa
              - - Scandensia
                - Gekkonomorpha
                  - AMNH FR 21444
                  - - Parviraptor (Conrad, 2008)
                    - - Gobekko
                      - Gekkota
              - - Tepexisaurus
                - - Banguinidae
                  - - Parmeosaurus
                    - Autarchoglossa
                      - Anguimorpha
                      - Scincomorpha
                        - - - Cordyloidea
                            - Lacertoidea (incl. Xantusiidae)
                        - Scincidae

Topology B: Simões et al. (2018)

- Squamata
  - Megachirella
  - - - Huehuecuetzpalli
      - Marmoretta
    - - Iguanomorpha
      - Scleroglossa (=Scincogekkonomorpha)
        - Gekkonomorpha
          - Eichstaettisaurus
          - - Gobekko
            - Gekkota
        - - Dibamus
          - Autarchoglossa
            - Ardeosaurus
            - Paramacellodus
            - - Lacertoidea
              - Anguimorpha
            - Scincomorpha
              - Xantusiidae
              - - Cordyloidea
                - Scincidae

== Paleobiology ==
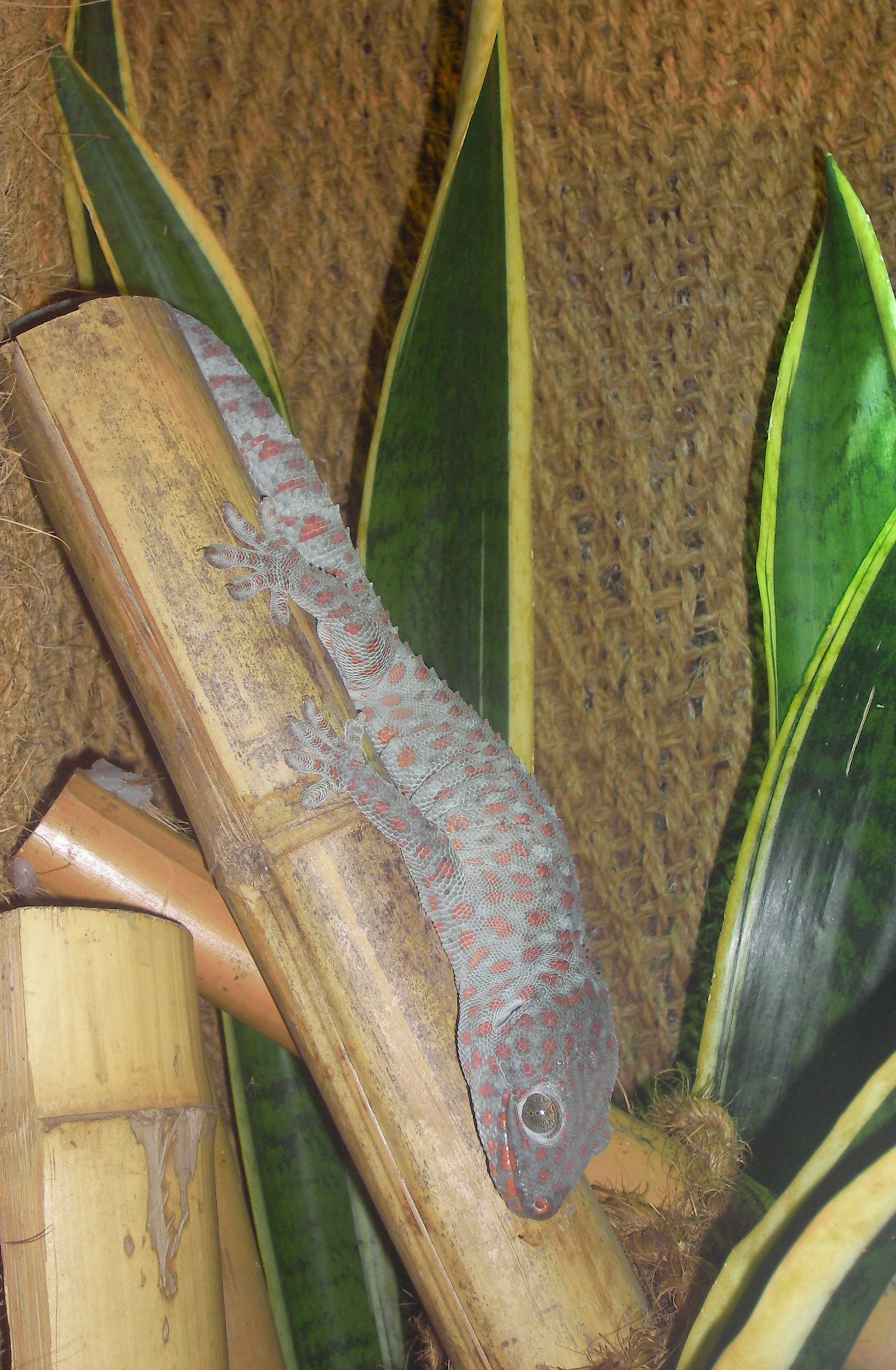
The bodyplan of Eichstaettisaurus has been compared to the Tokay gecko

Modern geckoes are unusual among lizards in that the digits of their limbs are relatively symmetrical in length, and are splayed in a broad arc; by contrast, the digits in other lizards are usually nearly parallel to each other, especially on the feet. The pattern seen in geckoes facilitates gripping while the body is in various orientations, since it spreads out the adhesive setae (bristles) on their toepads while allowing the first and last digits to oppose each other. Eichstaettisaurus schroederi exhibited two characteristics that contributed to foot symmetry: its first metatarsal was long relative to its third metatarsal (with the third metatarsal only being 1.41 times as long as the first, as opposed to 2 times in a typical lizard), and its fourth metatarsal was relatively short. In 2017, Simões and colleagues observed that E. schroederi had stronger foot symmetry than Ardeosaurus digitatellus, and they inferred that the feet of both were likely directed further forwards than other lizards. This was also supported by the lack of bicondylar articulations in the phalanges, which are an adaptation for outwards-facing feet that resists displacement in the horizontal plane while enabling flexion in the vertical plane.

Simões and colleagues also identified several other characteristics in E. schroederi, which suggest that the scansorial (climbing-based) lifestyles of modern geckoes arose earlier than previously appreciated. Its tall claws and elongate second-from-tip phalanges on the digits are both traits that have been strongly correlated with scansorial lifestyles in lizards. In particular, the tall claws may have provided longer lever arms for the flexor tendons that retracts them, thus improving their gripping strength. Meanwhile, its relatively short limbs and flattened body may have improved climbing performance by lowering its centre of gravity, as has been suggested for the Tokay gecko, but this feature may not be correlated with scansorial lifestyles. Finally, its limbs of similar lengths may have improved grip as in the sharp-snouted rock lizard; the significance of this trait may be diminished given the adhesive toepads of geckoes, and the lack of correlation between limb length ratio and scansoriality in the Lacertidae.

In 2004, Evans and colleagues had also discussed the lifestyle of E. gouldi in light of its bodily proportions. They pointed to a previous study on how variation between proportions among species of snow skinks (Carinascincus) was correlated with habitat usage: short torsos and long hindlimbs were correlated with rock climbing (in large species) and tree climbing (in small species), while long torsos and shorter hindlimbs were correlated with ground dwelling. Evans and colleagues found that E. gouldi was closest to the ground-dwelling species, which have slow running speeds and are relatively poor climbers, in its proportions. Nevertheless, they recognized that the flat bodies and tall claws of E. gouldi were adapted for clinging to rough surfaces. They proposed a hybrid lifestyle for E. gouldi: a slow-moving ground lizard with some capacity for climbing on rocks and hiding in crevices from predators like rhynchocephalians.

== Paleoecology ==
=== E. schroederi ===
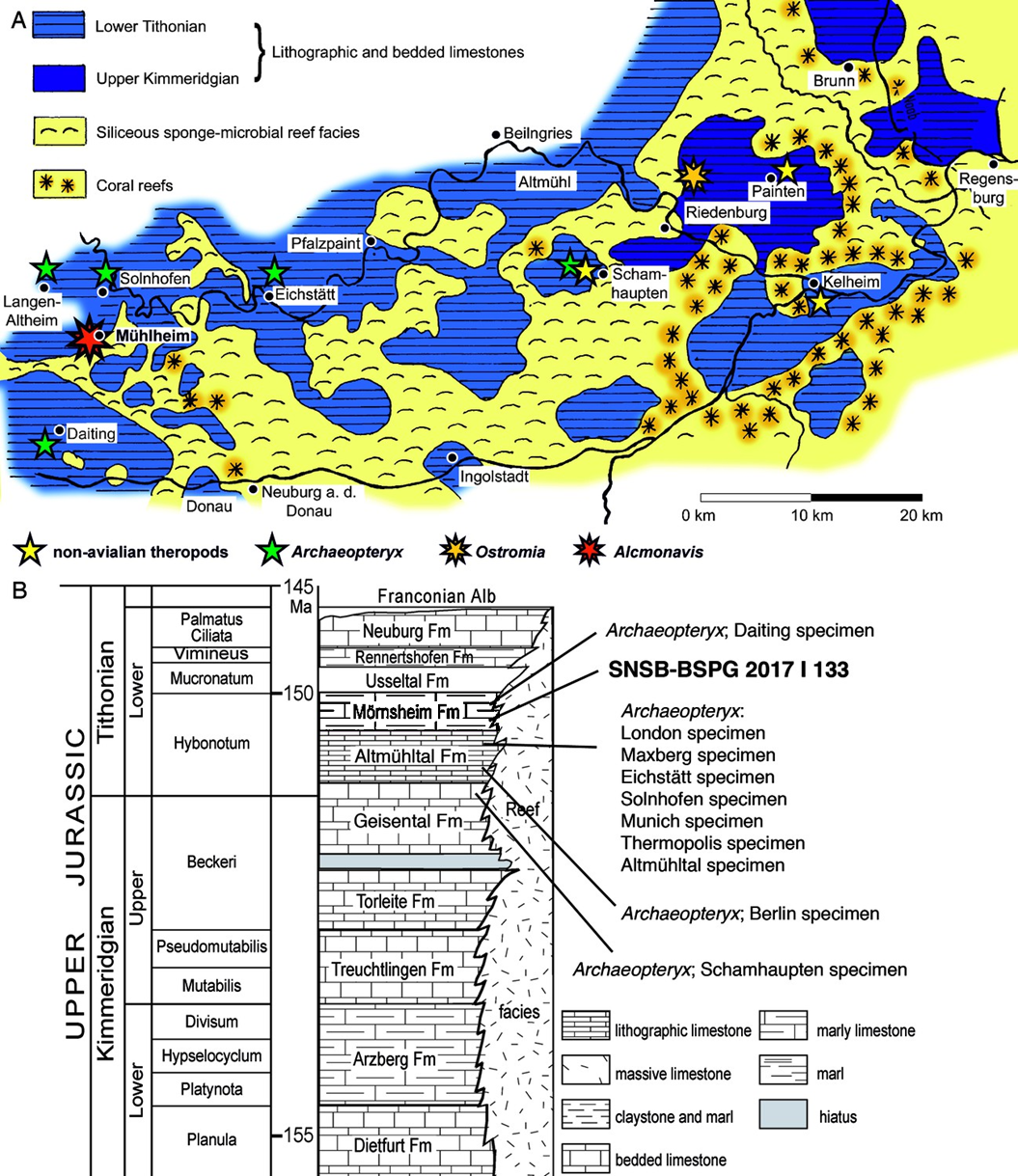
Stratigraphy of the Solnhofen limestones

The rock units at Wintershof that produced the only known specimen of E. schroederi are part of the Solnhofen limestones of southern Germany, which are well known for their exceptionally preserved fossils. Historically, the stratigraphy of the Solnhofen limestones has been the subject of considerable confusion, with the variety of environments and depositional patterns contributing to the confusion. They are now understood to consist of several geological formations in the Weißjura Group: in the strictest sense, they consist of the Altmühltal Formation to the northwest of Ingolstadt (including localities around Eichstätt), and the Painten Formation to the northeast of Ingolstadt. Within the Altmühltal Formation, the Wintershof quarry is part of the Upper Eichstätt Member, which in terms of ammonite biostratigraphy lies in the Euvirgalithacoceras eigeltingense-β horizon between the Lithacoceras riedense and Hybonoticeras hybonotum subzones. The deposits of the Altmühltal Formation, which have been dated to the lower Tithonian stage of the Jurassic period, consist of plattenkalk (very finely grained limestone-based muds such as micrite) forming even, thin layers measuring about 1 centimetre (0.39 in) thick that generally lack evidence of bioturbation (disturbance by living organisms).

During the Tithonian, the plattenkalk of the Altmühltal Formation was deposited in oceanic basins (called "wannen") within a warm, shallow sea surrounding an archipelago. These basins, which may have been lagoons, had a palaeolatitude of approximately 34° N, and were located at the northern margin of the Tethys Ocean. Fossils of bottom-dwelling animals like brittle stars and gastropods are virtually absent, which suggests that conditions at the sea floor were inhospitable to life; this may have been caused by one of several factors including hypersalinity, oxygen depletion, or the accumulation of toxic hydrogen sulfide. These conditions were responsible for the exceptional preservation of fossils like that of E. schroederi, which would have been predominantly transported from the surrounding land during heavy rainfall and storms. On land, the absence of ferns and the dominance of dry-adapted conifers suggest that the climate was semi-arid.

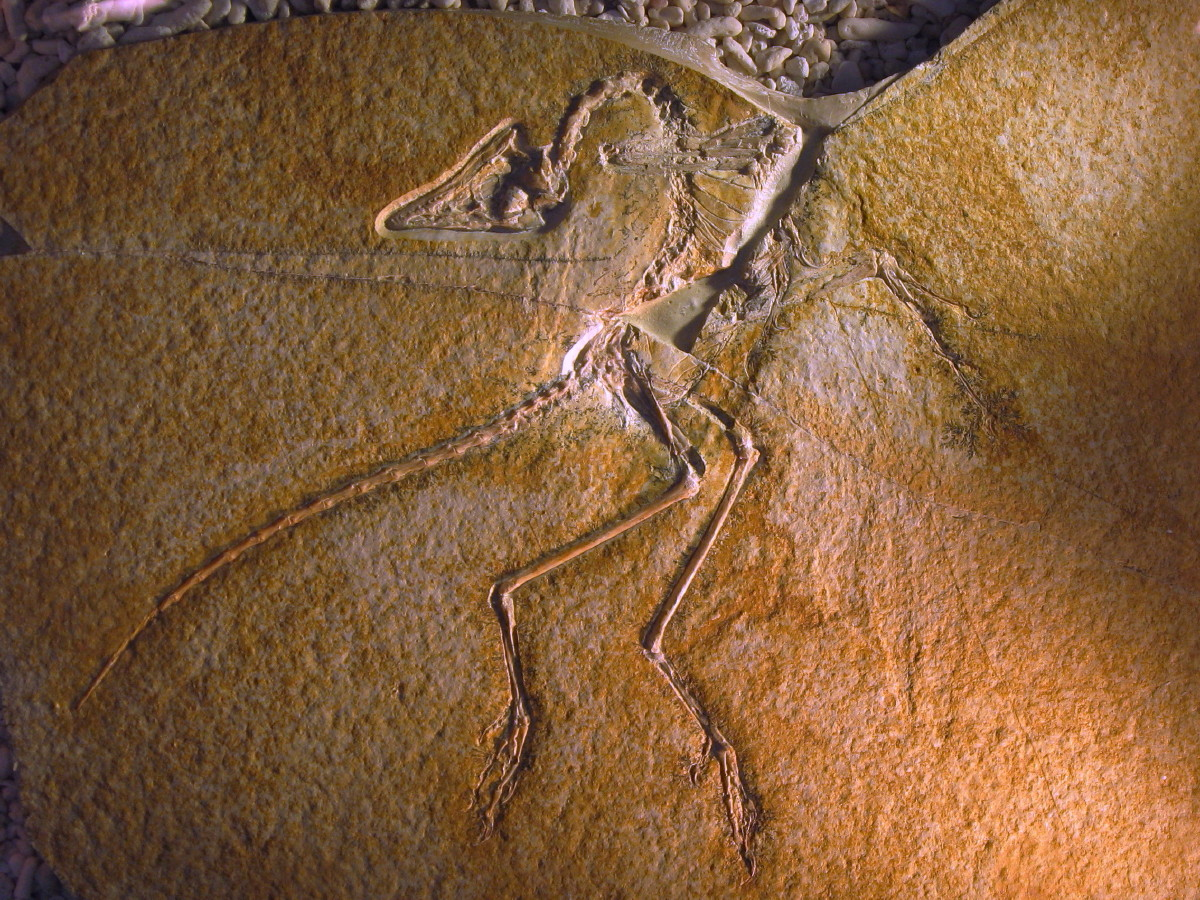
The Eichstätt specimen of Archaeopteryx

Both Ardeosaurus brevipes and A. digitatellus were discovered at Wintershof with E. schroederi, along with Homoeosaurus maximiliani and the rhynchocephalian Pleurosaurus goldfussi. Also known from Wintershof are the pterosaur Rhamphorhynchus muensteri, the crocodyliform Alligatorellus bavaricus, and various aquatic animals: the fish Anaethalion angustus, Ascalabos voithii, Aspidorhynchus acutirostris, Belonostomus spyraenoides, Caturus giganteus, Gyrodus circularis, Macrosemius rostratus, Palaeomacrosemius thiollieri, Propterus elongatus, and Zandtfuro tischlingeri; the angelshark Pseudorhina alifera; the squid-like coleoids Acanthoteuthis problematica, Belemnotheutis mayri, and Plesioteuthis prisca; the crinoid Saccocoma tenella, which is very common in Solnhofen deposits; the shrimp Dusa reschi; and the horseshoe crab Mesolimulus walchi. Nearby quarries have produced the Eichstätt specimen of the avialan dinosaur Archaeopteryx lithographica, and the pterosaurs Aerodactylus scolopaciceps, Germanodactylus cristatus, and possibly Cycnorhamphus.

=== E. gouldi ===
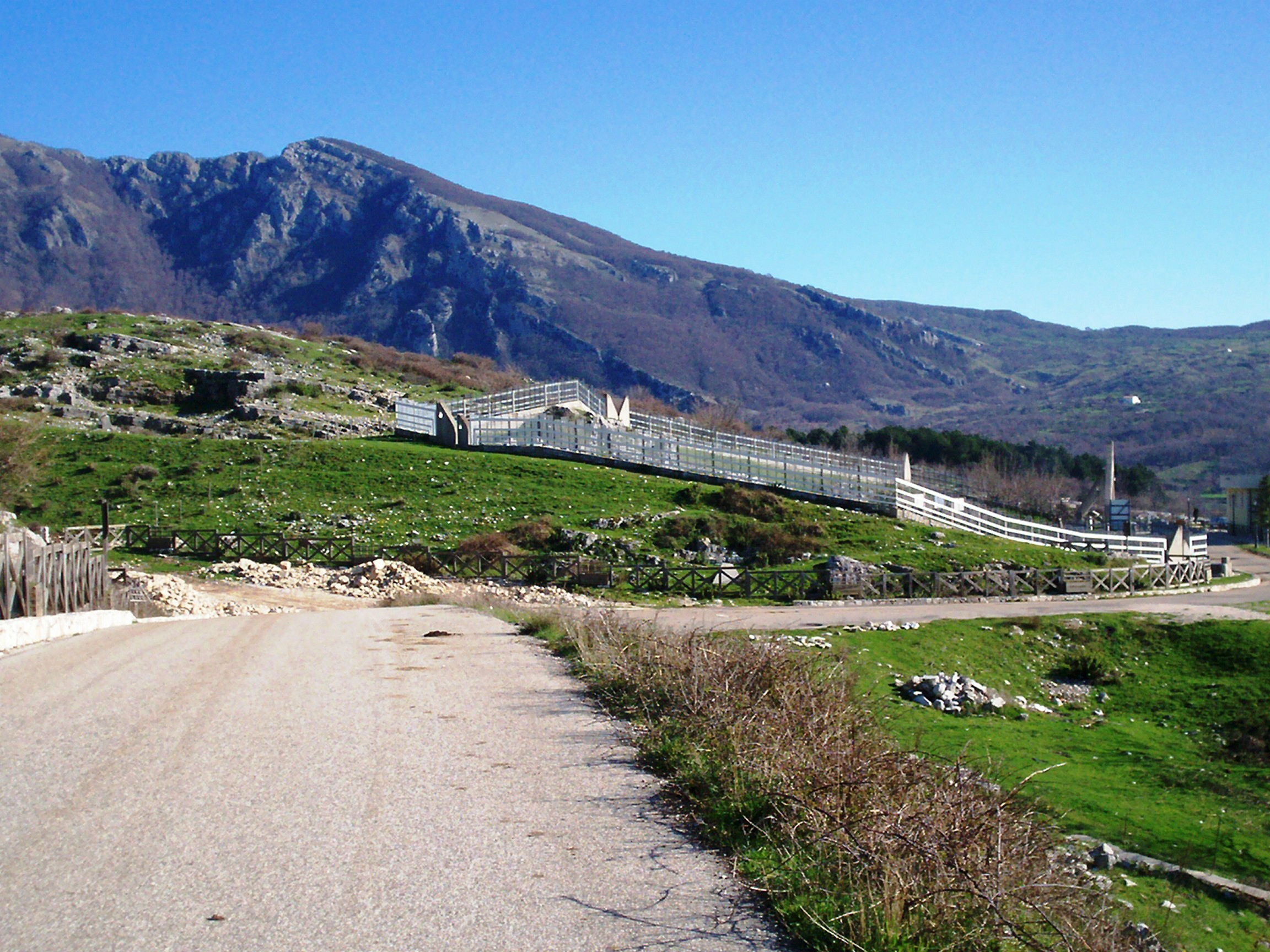
E. gouldi was found in the plattenkalk deposits of Pietraroia (middle ground)

The Pietraroja or Pietraroia locality, from where E. gouldi specimens are known, is formed by a plattenkalk outcrop at the top of a rock slope (the "Civita di Pietraroia") located at the eastern margin of the Matese Mountains. These mountains did not start to form until the Miocene, with the majority of the tectonic uplift that brought them to their current elevation having occurred between the Pliocene and the Pleistocene. At the locality, there are two distinct plattenkalk beds; the lower bed is coarser-grained and is largely devoid of fossils, while the upper bed is muddier and is the source of most fossils. The two beds are separated by lagoonal limestones. The plattenkalk is formed by layers of packstone and grainstone measuring 2–25 cm (0.79–9.84 in) thick, which alternate with layers of mudstone, wackestone, and marl; the upper bed is also characterized by the presence of sponge spicules, chert, bitumen, and coprolites.

On the basis of foraminiferans, the Pietaroia locality has been dated to the Albian epoch of the Early Cretaceous. During this time, the plattenkalk of Pietraroia would have been laid down in a shallow water carbonate platform close to a small island. The depositional environment was originally thought to have been a lagoon, but it has been re-interpreted as an east-flowing underwater channel that was gradually filled during the Aptian, based on patterns in the arrangement of fossils, the water currents, and the transportation of sediments. The lack of bioturbation likewise points to an anoxic environment, possibly related to a global oceanic anoxic event. Some fossils are well preserved while others were nearly destroyed, suggesting that they originated from various locations, with terrestrial animals like E. gouldi being brought into the channel by freshwater flows. The climate would have been tropical to subtropical.

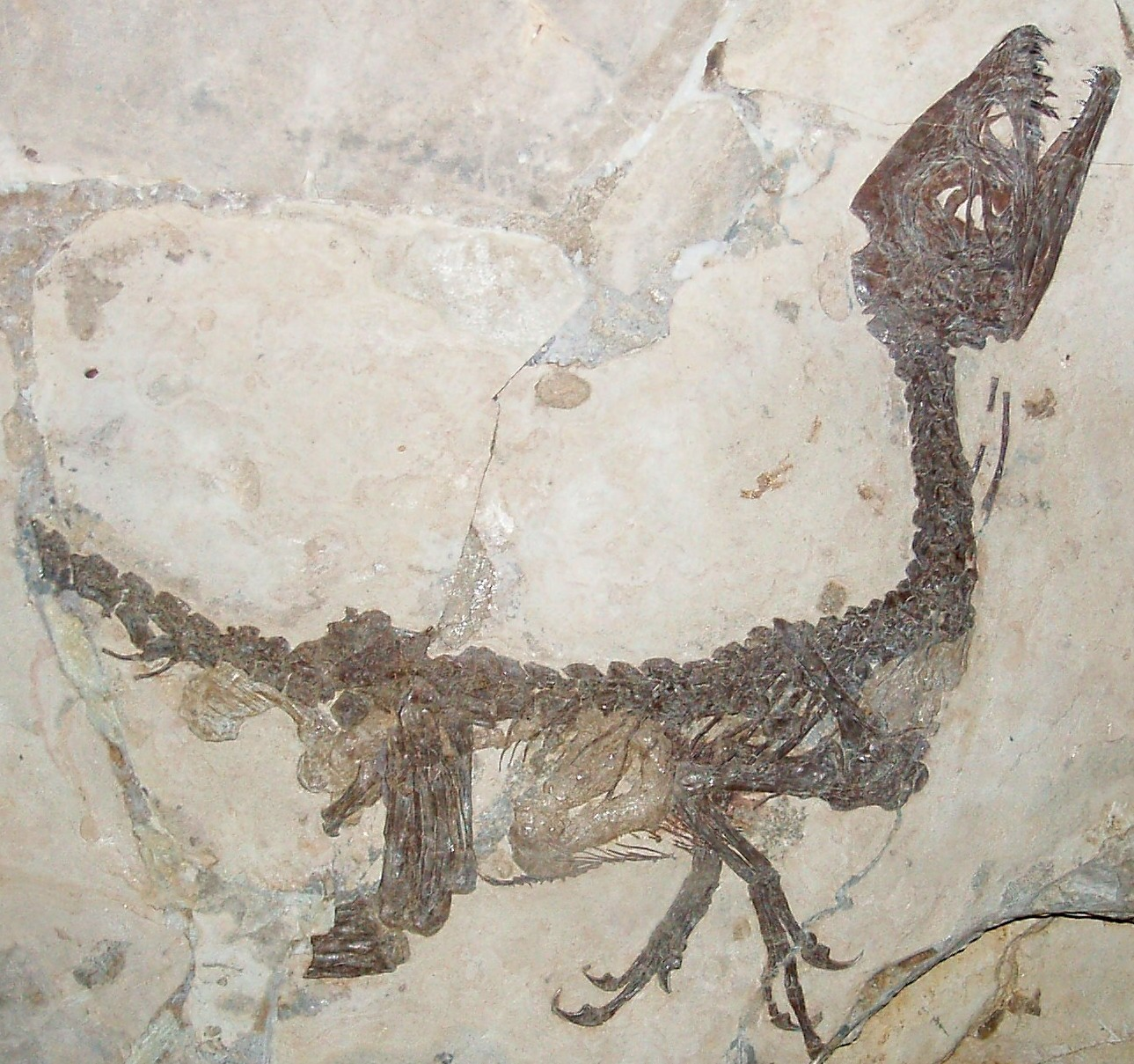
Scipionyx samniticus is a well known fossil from Pietraroia

In addition to E. gouldi and the rhynchocephalian MPN A01/82, other lepidosaurs from Pietraroia include the lizards Chometokadmon fitzingeri and Costasaurus rusconi, and the rhynchocephalian Derasmosaurus pietraroiae as well as a third unnamed juvenile specimen. The most well known fossil from Pietraroia is that of the compsognathid dinosaur Scipionyx samniticus, which preserves soft tissues including internal organs. Other reptiles include two crocodyliform specimens belonging to Pietraroiasuchus ormezzanoi, and the albanerpetontid amphibian Celtedens megacephalus. Many fish are known from Pietraroia, with the most common being a pycnodontid formerly identified as Coelodus costae but now known as Gregoriopycnodus bassanii. Others include Anaethalion robustus, Belonostomus crassirostris, Caeus leopoldi, Cavinichthys pietrarojae, Chirocentrites coroninii, relatives of Diplomystus brevissimus and Elopopsis fenzii, Hemieloposis gibbus, Ionoscopus petrarojae, Italophiopsis derasmoi, a species of Lepidotes, Notagogus pentlandi, Pleuropholis decastroi, Propterus scacchii, and Sauropsidium laevissimum. Cartilaginous fish included the angelshark Phorcynis and the ray Rhinobatus obtusatus. Invertebrates included rudists, bivalves, sea snails of the genus Nerinea, shrimp, and starfish.
