= Liushusaurus =

Liushusaurus Temporal range: Early Cretaceous
- Fossil specimen of L. acanthocaudata, Shanghai Natural History Museum

Scientific classification
- Kingdom: Animalia
- Phylum: Chordata
- Class: Reptilia
- Order: Squamata
- Genus: †Liushusaurus; Evans and Wang, 2010

Type species
- †Liushusaurus acanthocaudata Evans and Wang, 2010

Extinct genus of lizards

Liushusaurus is an extinct genus of lizard described by Susan E. Evans and Yuan Wang in 2010. The genus has a single species, Liushusaurus acanthocaudata, and is known from eight fossils, several of which preserve soft tissue detail. The specimens were found in the Lower Cretaceous aged Yixian Formation of Northeast China. Liushusaurus is one of eight lizards that are known and have been named from the Yixian Formation, part of the diverse Jehol Biota ecosystem.

== Etymology ==
Evans and Wang coined the generic name or Liushusaurus from the Chinese word liushu and the Greek language word sauros. Liushu which translates as "willow tree", is derived from Liutiao, willow leaf, and refers to Liutiaogou, willow leaf valley, where the fossils were found. The Greek word sauros (σαύρος) translates to "lizard". Evans and Wang chose the specific name from a combination of the Latin words acanthus meaning "spine" and cauda meaning tail. This combination is in allusion to the scale structure found along the tail.

== Description ==
Liushusaurus was a medium-sized, stocky lizard with a wide body and short legs. Several fossils preserve the outline of individuals and show that they were robustly built, with a thick tail and legs. The body outline extends beyond the ribcage to show a wide midsection as well.

Several fossil specimens show a high degree of preservation, with intact scales, pigmentation, claw sheaths, cartilage, and small bones. The orbitospenoids are present in one specimen as two small crescent-shaped bones. These bones support the cartilage and membrane that makes up the braincase, and are rarely preserved in fossil lizards. Postcloacal or hemipenial bones are also known, which are part of the hemipenis in male individuals.

The dorsal scales that cover the back are much smaller than the ventral scales that cover the underside, which are rhomboidal and overlap each other. The bases of the ventral scales are darker than their edges. They are darkest toward the middle of the belly and nearest the midline. The ventral scales decrease in size toward the neck and limbs, becoming rounder and less dark. Going down the tail, the scales get longer and narrower and start to taper. Their coloration gives them the appearance of small spines. The dorsal scales are round and granular, each less than half a millimetre in diameter. Scales on the head are also granular, unlike the platelike scales of scincomorph and anguimorph lizards. An area of the skull not covered by scales indicates the presence of the tympanum, the external hearing structure of lizards.

Liushusaurus is known from several well preserved fossils representing eight individuals. These individuals range in age from near-hatchling to adult. All specimens preserve the tibia and fibula of the lower leg, and the length of these bones ranges from 3.62 millimetres (0.143 in) to 11.85 millimetres (0.467 in). This indicates a wide range of ontogenetic variation. Large individuals have smaller feet in relation to their hindlimbs than small individuals, while small individuals have proportionally shorter forelimbs relative to their hindlimbs.

Liushusaurus may have been sexually dimorphic, as specimens have been found with possible post-cloacal bones that would indicate they are males. These bones are seen in some living lizards such as gekkotans. Specimens with these bones tend to be the largest individuals, suggesting that males may have been larger than females.

== Classification ==
Based on a phylogenetic analysis that was conducted along with its initial description, Liushusaurus is closely related to Scleroglossa, a group that includes geckos, skinks, worm lizards, monitor lizards, and snakes. However, it is classified as a more basal member of the clade Scincogekkonomorpha, which includes Scleroglossa and all taxa more closely related to Scleroglossa than to Iguania. This encompasses several other extinct taxa, such as Ardeosaurus and Bavarisaurus from the Late Jurassic Solnhofen limestone of Germany. Together, these extinct taxa are considered stem scleroglossans. Out of all of these taxa, Liushusaurus is most closely related to Scleroglossa, being the sister taxon of the clade. However, the results of the phylogenetic analysis were uncertain because of difficulties in distinguishing stem scleroglossans based on their morphology.

Below is a cladogram modified from the phylogenetic analysis of Evans and Wang, 2010:

- Squamata
  - - - Iguania
      - †Huehuecuetzpalli
    - †Hoyalacerta
  - Scincogekkonomorpha
    - †Bavarisaurus
    - - †Eichstaettisaurus
      - - †Scandensia
        - - †Ardeosaurus
          - - †Yabeinosaurus
            - - †Liushusaurus
              - Scleroglossa

== Paleobiology ==
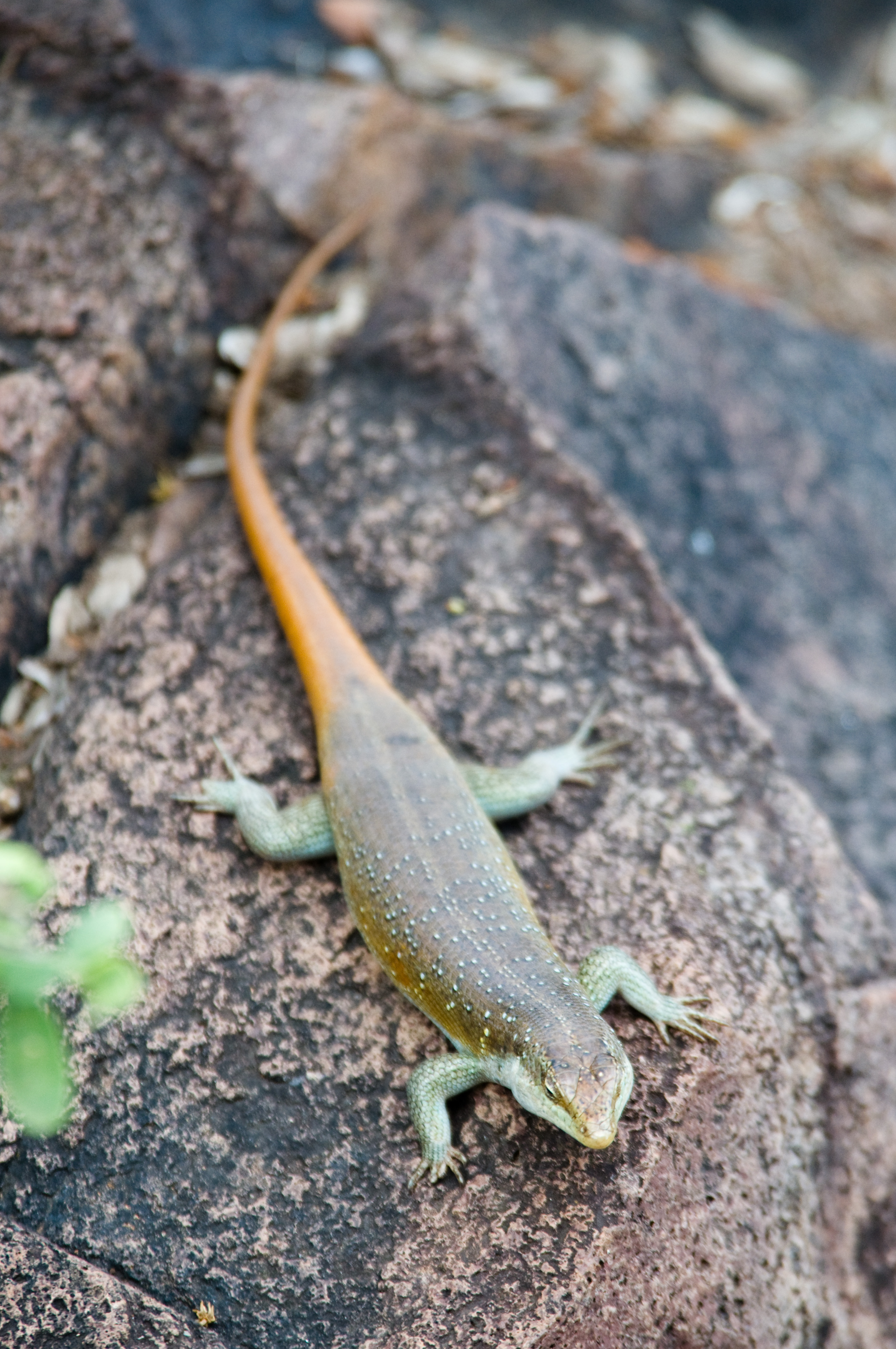
Liushusaurus probably had a similar lifestyle to flat lizards, such as this Common Flat Lizard.

Liushusaurus probably had a similar lifestyle to living Malagasy geckos of the genus Uroplatus or African cordylid lizards of the genus Platysaurus. Both types of lizards have flattened bodies. Like living lizards with this body shape, Liushusaurus had a relatively short scapula and short suprascapular cartilage above it. It also had long ribs toward its backside that did not curve greatly. Liushusaurus may have been more similar in appearance to the living Chuckwalla (Sauromalus) of North America, which has a broad rather than flat body.

Liushusaurus likely climbed on rough surfaces such as rocks and vegetation, aided by long, sharp claws, relatively symmetrical feet, long forelimbs, and well-developed scales on the undersides of its digits called tubercular plantar digital scales. The flattened body may have been useful in thermoregulation, providing a greater surface area for heat from the sun to reach while basking. It may also have allowed Liushusaurus to fit into small crevices like the living Platysaurus. Alternatively, the depressed body shape could have helped Liushusaurus control falls like the living Leiolepis, or Butterfly lizard. It may also have helped disguise the outline of the body as in Uroplatus.

The small, conical teeth of Liushusaurus suggest that it ate insects and other small invertebrates. Many species of dragonflies have been described from the Yixian Formation, as well as gnats, mayflies, beetles, and many other insects, and may have been part of the diet of Liushusaurus.

=== Paleoecology ===
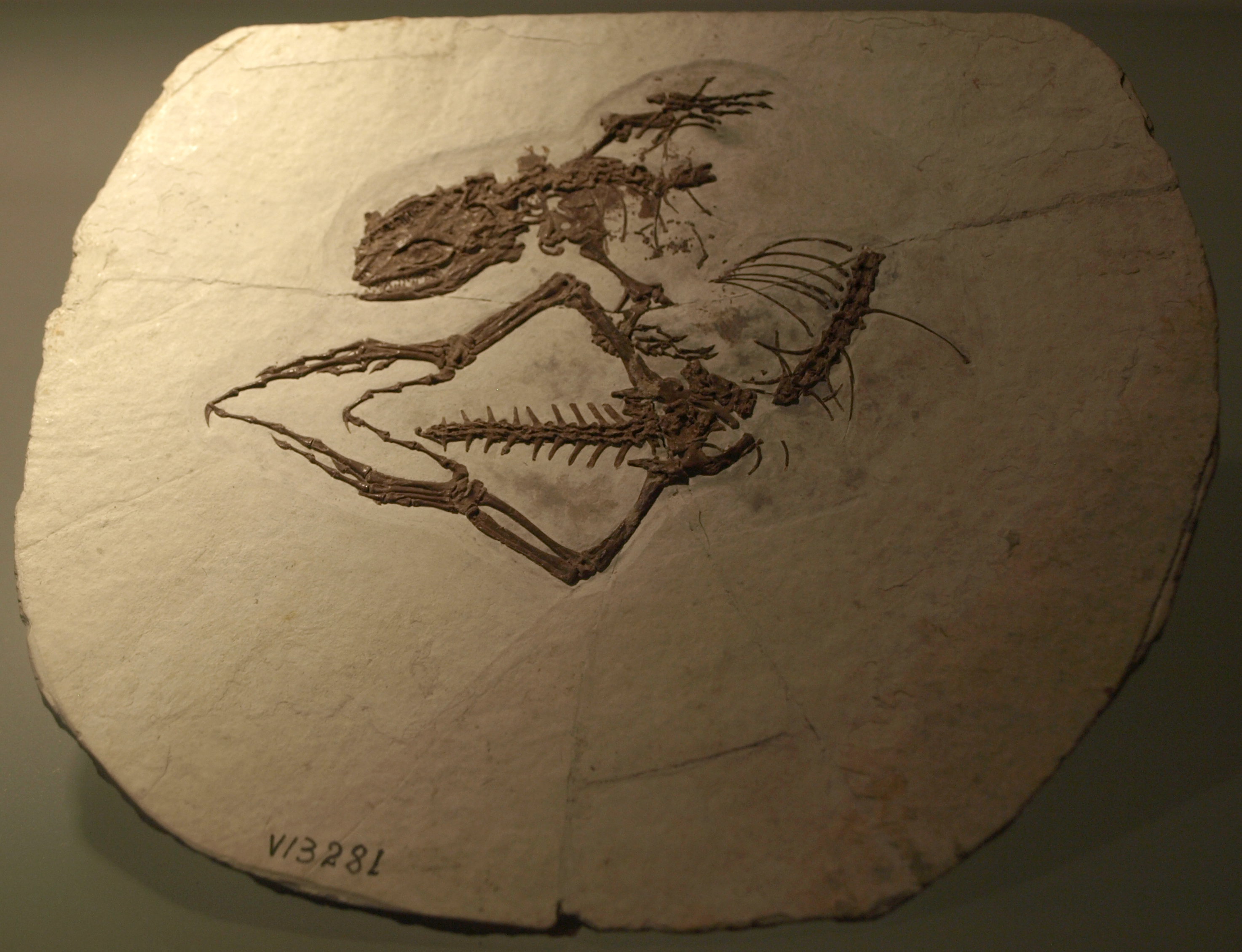
Dalinghosaurus, a common lizard in the Yixian Formation that lived alongside Liushusaurus.

Liushusaurus lived alongside several other lizards, the most common of which from the Jehol Group are Yabeinosaurus and Dalinghosaurus. Several other genera have been described, mostly from juvenile specimens. These include Jeholacerta, Liaoningolacerta, and Xianglong. Jeholacerta is known only from a skin impression and several skull impressions, while Liaoningolacerta has been described from a single specimen belonging to a very young individual. Xianglong is known from better material, and elongate ribs indicate it was a gliding lizard.
