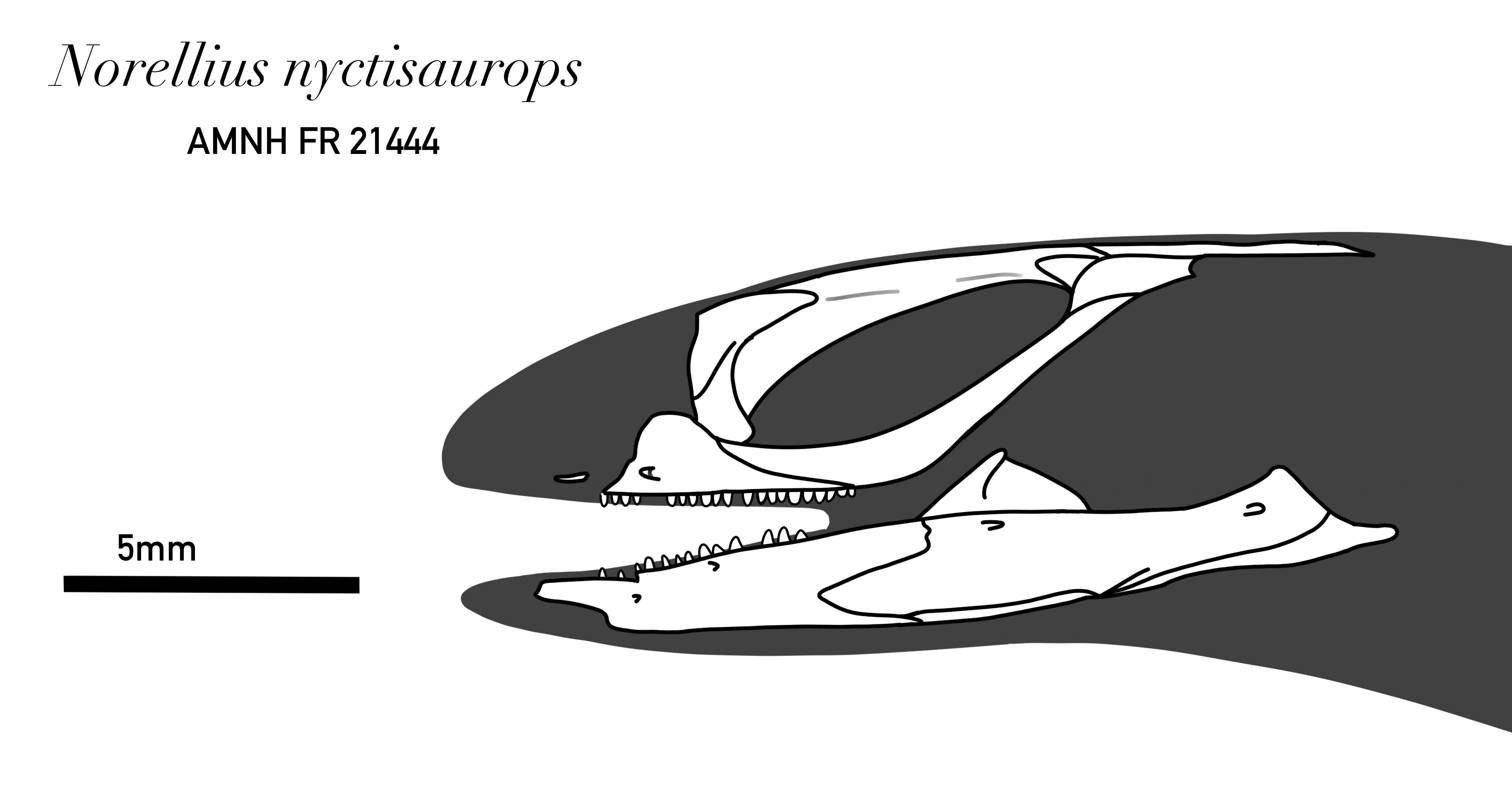

Scientific classification
- Kingdom: Animalia
- Phylum: Chordata
- Order: Squamata
- Clade: Gekkonomorpha
- Genus: †Norellius; Conrad and Daza, 2015

Type species
- †Norellius nyctisaurops Conrad and Daza, 2015

= Norellius =

Norellius Temporal range: Early Cretaceous, 130 Ma

Extinct genus of scleroglossan lizard

Norellius is an extinct genus of scleroglossan lizard from the Early Cretaceous Öösh Formation of Mongolia. It is known from a well-preserved skull that was collected by an American Museum of Natural History expedition to Mongolia in 1923 and cataloged as AMNH FR 21444. After its initial cataloging, the specimen was not mentioned again in the scientific literature until 2004, when it was recognized as belonging to a potential early relative of modern groups of squamates such as gekkotans, amphisbaenians, dibamids, and snakes. AMNH FR 21444 was more fully described in a 2006 study that used high-resolution computed tomography to examine the skull and its braincase, and was described as a new genus and species, Norellius nyctisaurops, in 2015. The genus name honors paleontologist Mark Norell. The 2006 study incorporated the specimen into a phylogenetic analysis and found it to be a basal member of an evolutionary grouping called Gekkonomorpha, a stem-based taxon that includes living geckos and legless lizards (pygopodids) and all taxa more closely related to them than to any other living lizard. Norellius lies outside the node-based taxon Gekkota, a more strictly defined subgroup of Gekkonomorpha that includes geckos, pygopodids, and all descendants of their most recent common ancestor. Therefore, while Norellius is more closely related to geckos and pygopodids than it is to any other living group of lizards, it branched off before the most recent common ancestor of these two groups. Below is a cladogram showing the position of Norellius according to this phylogeny:

- Squamata
  - - †Hoyalacerta
    - Iguania
  - Scincogekkonomorpha
    - †Bavarisaurus
    - - †Eichstaettisaurus
      - - †Scandensia
        - Scleroglossa
          - - †Parviraptor
            - - †Myrmecodaptria
              - - †Ardeosaurus
                - Autarchoglossa
          - Gekkonomorpha
            - †Norellius
            - Gekkota
