= Jucaraseps =

Jucaraseps Temporal range: Early Cretaceous

Scientific classification
- Kingdom: Animalia
- Phylum: Chordata
- Class: Reptilia
- Order: Squamata
- Genus: †Jucaraseps; Bolet & Evans, 2012

Type species
- †Jucaraseps grandipes Bolet & Evans, 2012

Extinct genus of lizards

Jucaraseps is an extinct genus of small squamate lizard known from the Early Cretaceous of Las Hoyas, Spain. It contains a single species, Jucaraseps grandipes. It belonged to the clade Scincogekkonomorpha (containing scleroglossan squamates and those taxa which were more closely related to them than to Iguania) and was related to the clade Scleroglossa as well to Jurassic and Cretaceous taxa Eichstaettisaurus, Ardeosaurus, Bavarisaurus, Parviraptor, Yabeinosaurus and Sakurasaurus
