= Calanguban =

Calanguban Temporal range: Early Cretaceous

Scientific classification
- Domain: Eukaryota
- Kingdom: Animalia
- Phylum: Chordata
- Class: Reptilia
- Order: Squamata
- Clade: Scincogekkonomorpha
- Genus: †Calanguban; Simões et al., 2014
- Species: †C. alamoi

Binomial name
- †Calanguban alamoi Simões et al., 2014

Extinct genus of lizards

Calanguban is an extinct genus of scincogekkonomorph lizard from the Early Cretaceous of South America. The type species Calanguban alamoi was named in 2014 from the Crato Formation of Brazil and is the oldest known non-iguanian lizard from the continent. Originally described as a scleroglossan lizard with scincomorph affinities, it likely had an arboreal lifestyle. The holotype (MN 7234-V) was destroyed in 2018 due to the National Museum of Brazil fire, so a neotype (MN 7875-V) possibly from the same formation was proposed in 2025, leading to a new classification of this taxon as a borioteiioid lizard.
