= Myrmecodaptria =

Myrmecodaptria Temporal range: Late Cretaceous

Scientific classification
- Domain: Eukaryota
- Kingdom: Animalia
- Phylum: Chordata
- Class: Reptilia
- Order: Squamata
- Family: †Bainguidae
- Genus: †Myrmecodaptria; Gao and Norell, 2000

Type species
- †Myrmecodaptria microphagosa Gao and Norell, 2000

Extinct genus of lizards

Myrmecodaptria (meaning "ant eater" in Greek) is an extinct genus of scleroglossan lizard from the Late Cretaceous Djadokhta Formation in Ukhaa Tolgod, Mongolia. The type and only species, Myrmecodaptria microphagosa (microphagosa meaning "eating little" in Greek), was named in 2000 by paleontologists Gao Keqin and Mark Norell. Myrmecodaptria is known from a single holotype skull and lower jaws. It is distinguished from all other lizards by its extremely elongated skull. The eyes are placed close to the snout, which is short and rounded. The top of the skull is covered in bony knobs called osteoderms. The parietal bone at the back of the skull is elongated and about as long as the frontal bones, which are the usually the longest bones along the top of the skull in lizards. The squamosal bone at the back of the skull reaches forward to connect with the jugal bone behind the eye, forming a thin arch between the temporal fenestrae. Myrmecodaptria also has fewer and more widely spaced teeth in its jaws than do most other lizards.

When Myrmecodaptria was first described in 2000 it was thought to be a member of Gekkota, the group that includes living geckos and pygopodids (legless lizards). Characteristics that Myrmecodaptria shares in common with gekkotans include fused frontal bones that form a tube within the skull and the absence of a postorbital bone. However, Myrmecodaptria has many features that are not found in gekkotans, such as the presence of a small hole at the top of the skull called the parietal foramen, a thick jugal bone forming a complete postorbital bar behind the eye socket, and a complete upper temporal arch closing off a pair of holes at the top of the skull called the supratemporal fenestrae. The first study to include Myrmecodaptria in a phylogenetic analysis was published in 2006, and it did not find support for Myrmecodaptria being a gekkotan. Instead, Myrmecodaptria was found to be more closely related to a group of lizards called Autarchoglossa, a large clade or evolutionary grouping that includes skinks, anguimorphs, and snakes. The supposedly gekkotan features seen in Myrmecodaptria may instead be characteristic of the earliest members of Scleroglossa, which split into gekkotans and autarchoglossans. Myrmecodaptria is part of the scleroglossan lineage leading to autarchoglossans, making it a "stem" autarchoglossan. Myrmecodaptria was again included in a phylogenetic analysis authored by Jack Conrad in 2008, which placed it in an extinct group called Bainguidae. Bainguidae was positioned at the stem of Autarchoglossa in the analysis (within a larger clade called Evansauria), but this relationship had only weak support. The best known member of Banguidae, Bainguis, may instead be a closer relative of living anguids or lacertoids, in which case Bainguidae would not be a valid grouping.

A large phylogenetic analysis published in 2012, which resulted a very different hypothesis for the evolutionary relationships of lizards than those of previous analyses, found Myrmecodaptria to be closely related to the genus Carusia, which is also from the Late Cretaceous of Mongolia. In Conrad's 2008 analysis, Carusia was deeply nested within Autarchoglossa as a close relative of the living genus Xenosaurus. The 2012 analysis instead found that Myrmecodaptria and Carusia were close relatives of the family Scincidae, which includes modern skinks. Both genera were placed in a family called Carusiidae. While a close relationship to scincids was only weakly supported, the grouping of Myrmecodaptria and Carusia as sister taxa was strongly supported by nine shared characteristics, including fused frontals (which, according to the analysis, evolved independently in gekkotans and Carusiidae).
