= Indrasaurus =

Indrasaurus Temporal range: Early Cretaceous, 120 Ma

Scientific classification
- Domain: Eukaryota
- Kingdom: Animalia
- Phylum: Chordata
- Class: Reptilia
- Order: Squamata
- Informal group: Scleroglossa
- Genus: †Indrasaurus; O'Connor et al., 2019
- Species: †I. wangi

Binomial name
- †Indrasaurus wangi O'Connor et al., 2019

Genus of lizards

Indrasaurus is a genus of extinct lizards, containing one species, Indrasaurus wangi. Its fossil remains were found as stomach contents of a Microraptor fossil specimen found in the Liaoning province, China in 2003. It was found by a team of paleontologists led by Professor Jingmai O'Connor from the Institute of Vertebrate Paleontology and Paleoanthropology (IVPP), together with researchers from the Shandong Tianyu Museum of Nature. The stomach content of the Microraptor was not recognised by scientists when it was first uncovered. On further examination by scientists in 2019, the Microraptor stomach contents were revealed to contain the fully swallowed remains of a previously unknown lizard species. Following this, the new species was formally described and named in 2019. The species was named after Prof. Wang Yuan of IVPP, also the director of the Paleozoological Museum of China at the time of identification of the species and an expert on the paleoherpetofauna of China. The name Indrasaurus was inspired by a Vedic legend in which god Indra was swallowed by the dragon Vritra during a great battle (the dragon in the legend being equated with the Microraptor specimen that had swallowed the lizard specimen).
