= Pedrerasaurus =

Pedrerasaurus Temporal range: Barremian ~129–125 Ma

Scientific classification
- Kingdom: Animalia
- Phylum: Chordata
- Class: Reptilia
- Order: Squamata
- Genus: †Pedrerasaurus; Bolet & Evans, 2010

Type species
- †Pedrerasaurus latifrontalis Bolet & Evans, 2010

Extinct genus of lizards

Pedrerasaurus is an extinct genus of scincogekkonomorph lizard from the Early Cretaceous (Barremian) La Pedrera de Rúbies Formation of Spain. The type species is P. latifrontalis. It is similar in appearance to Meyasaurus, a widespread Early Cretaceous lizard that is also known from the Iberian Peninsula. Both genera have bicuspid (two-cusped) teeth, but unlike Meyasaurus, Pedrerasaurus has frontal bones that are not fused or constricted.
