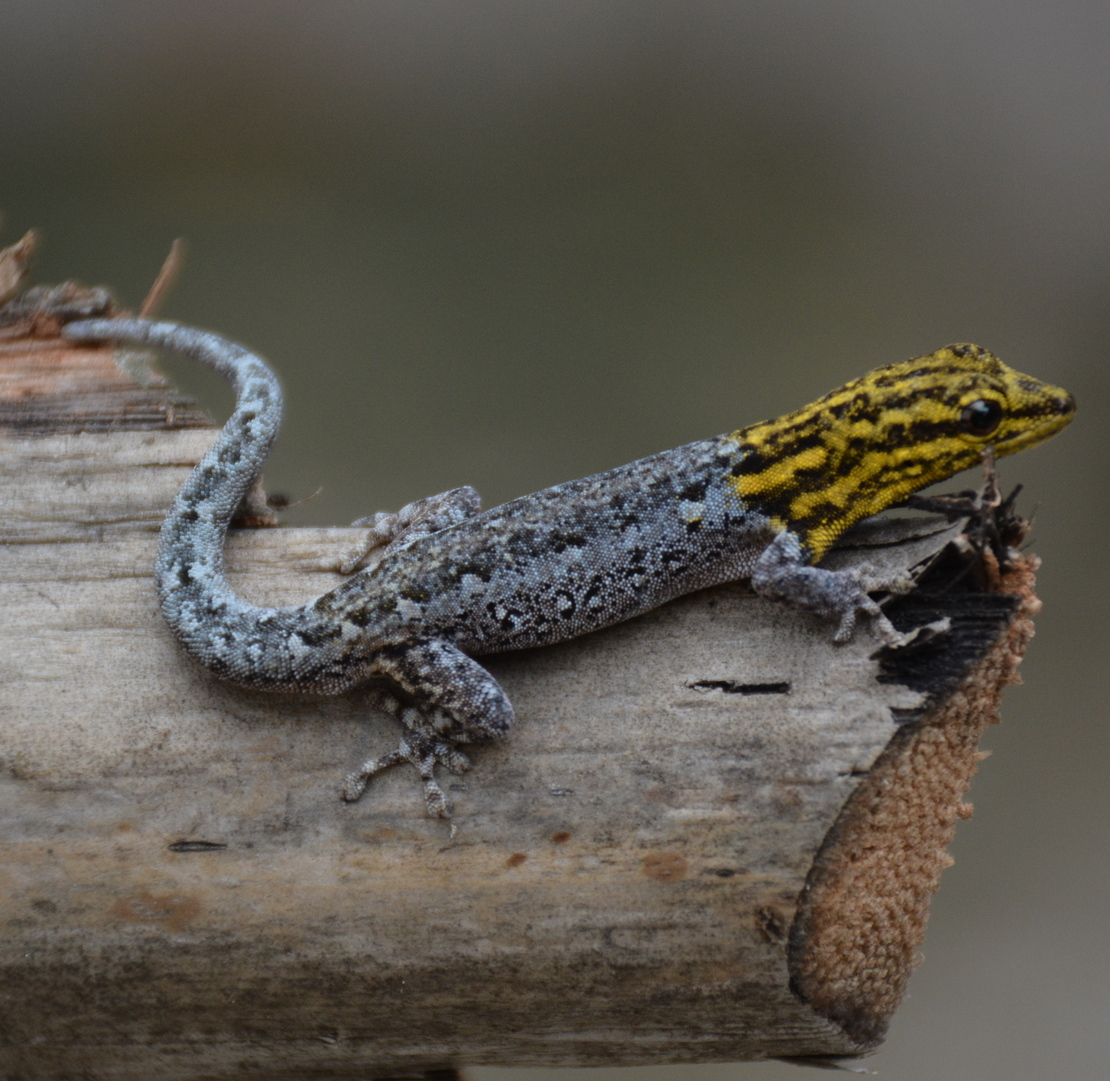
- White-headed dwarf gecko (Lygodactylus picturatus)

Scientific classification
- Kingdom: Animalia
- Phylum: Chordata
- Class: Reptilia
- Order: Squamata
- Clade: Scincogekkonomorpha; Sukhanov, 1961

Subgroups
- †Ardeosaurus †Bavarisauridae †Eichstaettisaurus †Jucaraseps †Liushusaurus †Parviraptor †Pedrerasaurus †Saurillodon †Scandensia †?Yabeinosaurus †Polyglyphanodontia; Scleroglossa

= Scincogekkonomorpha =

Scincogekkonomorpha Temporal range: Middle Jurassic–Present

Clade of lizards

Scincogekkonomorpha is a proposed clade of lizards that includes scleroglossans and all lizards more closely related to scleroglossans than to iguanians. These "stem" scleroglossans include extinct lizards from the Late Jurassic and Early Cretaceous such as Bavarisaurus, Eichstaettisaurus, Liushusaurus, and Scandensia. Scincogekkonomorpha was named in 1961 and is now occasionally used as a stem-based taxon in contrast to the node-based taxon Scleroglossa. According to phylogenies based on morphological characteristics, Scincogekkonomorpha is the sister taxon of Iguania and together they make up crown group Squamata, the smallest clade including all living snakes and lizards. The grouping has not been recovered as monophyletic in recent molecular studies, with Iguania generally found deeply nested within Squamata.
