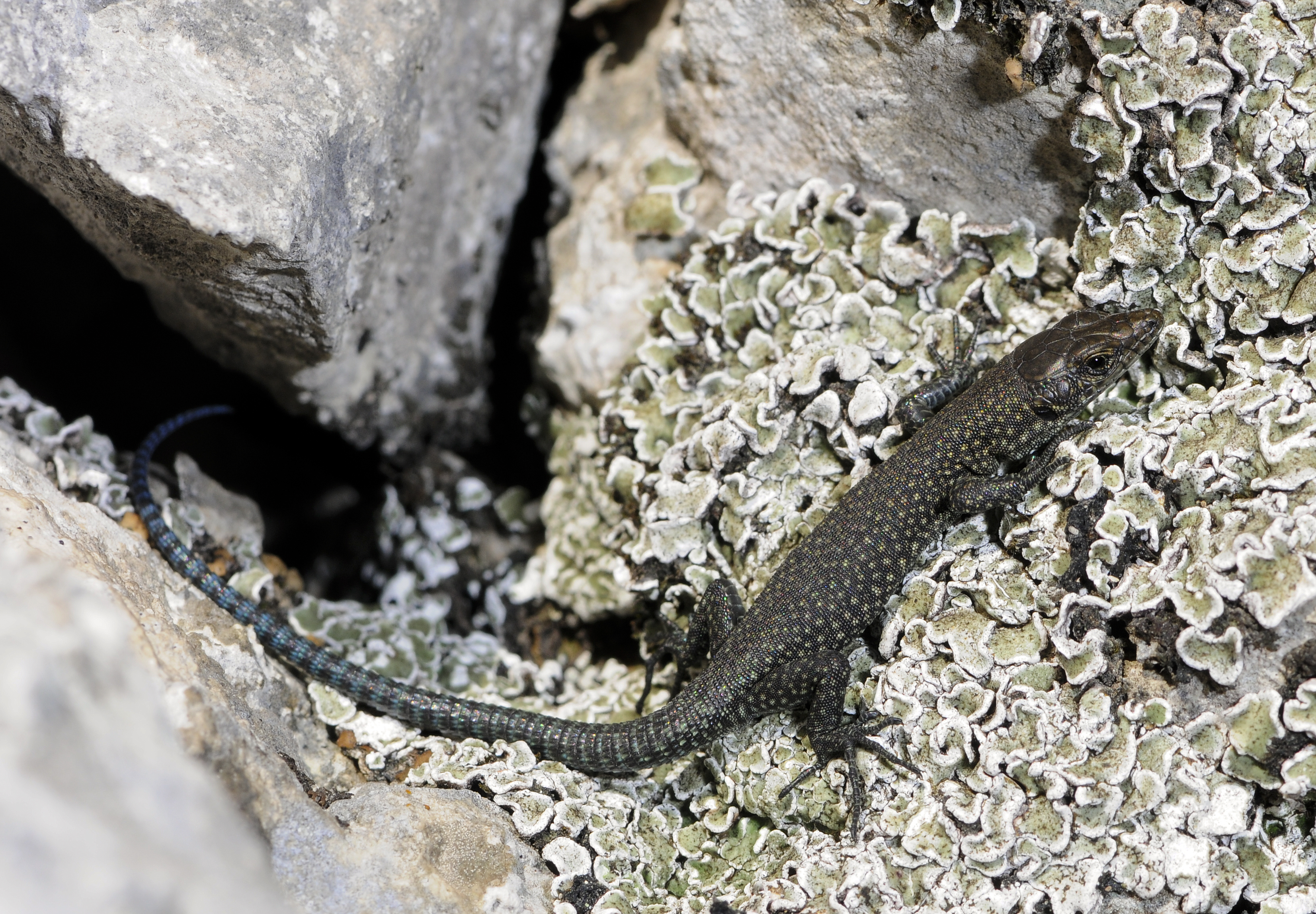

Conservation status
- Least Concern (IUCN 3.1)

Scientific classification
- Kingdom: Animalia
- Phylum: Chordata
- Class: Reptilia
- Order: Squamata
- Family: Lacertidae
- Genus: Dalmatolacerta; Arnold, Arribas, & Carranza, 2007
- Species: D. oxycephala

Binomial name
- Dalmatolacerta oxycephala Duméril & Bibron, 1839

Synonyms
- Lacerta oxycephala

= Sharp-snouted rock lizard =

Species of lizard

The sharp-snouted rock lizard (Dalmatolacerta oxycephala) is a species of lizard in the family Lacertidae. It is found in Bosnia and Herzegovina, Croatia, Montenegro, and possibly Albania, where its natural habitats are Mediterranean-type shrubby vegetation, rocky areas, rocky shores, rural gardens, and urban areas.

== Description ==
The sharp-snouted rock lizard is a slender, flattened lizard with a pointed snout and somewhat bulgy eyes. The adult snout-to-vent length is up to 6.5 cm (2.6 in) with a tail one and a half times or twice as long as the body. The hind toes are kinked and are shorter than those of other species in the genus. Another distinctive feature is the wide central pair of scales under the tail. There are two main colour forms; in lowland regions the body is greyish-buff with a brown reticulated pattern and the tail is boldly striped transversely in black and turquoise-green; in upland areas and on some offshore islands the colour is much darker and may be completely black. The colour of lizards from intermediate altitudes varies. In all cases, the underside is blue, with a more intense colour in males. Some individuals change colour during the year, being darker during colder weather. Juveniles have the colouring of a lowland adult but with more vivid tail stripes.

== Distribution and habitat ==
The sharp-snouted rock lizard is endemic to the former country of Yugoslavia and possibly also part of Albania. It is found in rocky places, on cliffs, boulders, rock pavements, walls, piles of stones, buildings and sometimes the trunks of trees, at altitudes of up to 1,500 metres (4,900 ft). It is a skilful climber and is often to be seen 20 or 30 metres (67 or 100 ft) high on walls and roofs. The light form is well camouflaged on the limestone rocks found in this region and the dark form also blends into the background because the cliffs are cleft with deep fissures and dark-coloured moss grows in the cracks.

== Behaviour ==
The sharp-snouted rock lizard is a hardy species and very cold-tolerant, sometimes being seen when the ground is covered with snow. In summer it likes to bask in the sun. It feeds on small invertebrates including flying insects which are caught when they land on the surface of the rock. Females lay clutches of two to four sausage-shaped, white eggs which hatch in six to seven weeks, the juveniles having a snout-to-vent length of about 2 cm (0.8 in).

== Status ==
The sharp-snouted rock lizard has a wide range, is common in suitable habitat and is assumed to have a large total population. It is an adaptable species and no specific threats have been identified so the IUCN has assessed it as being of "least concern".
