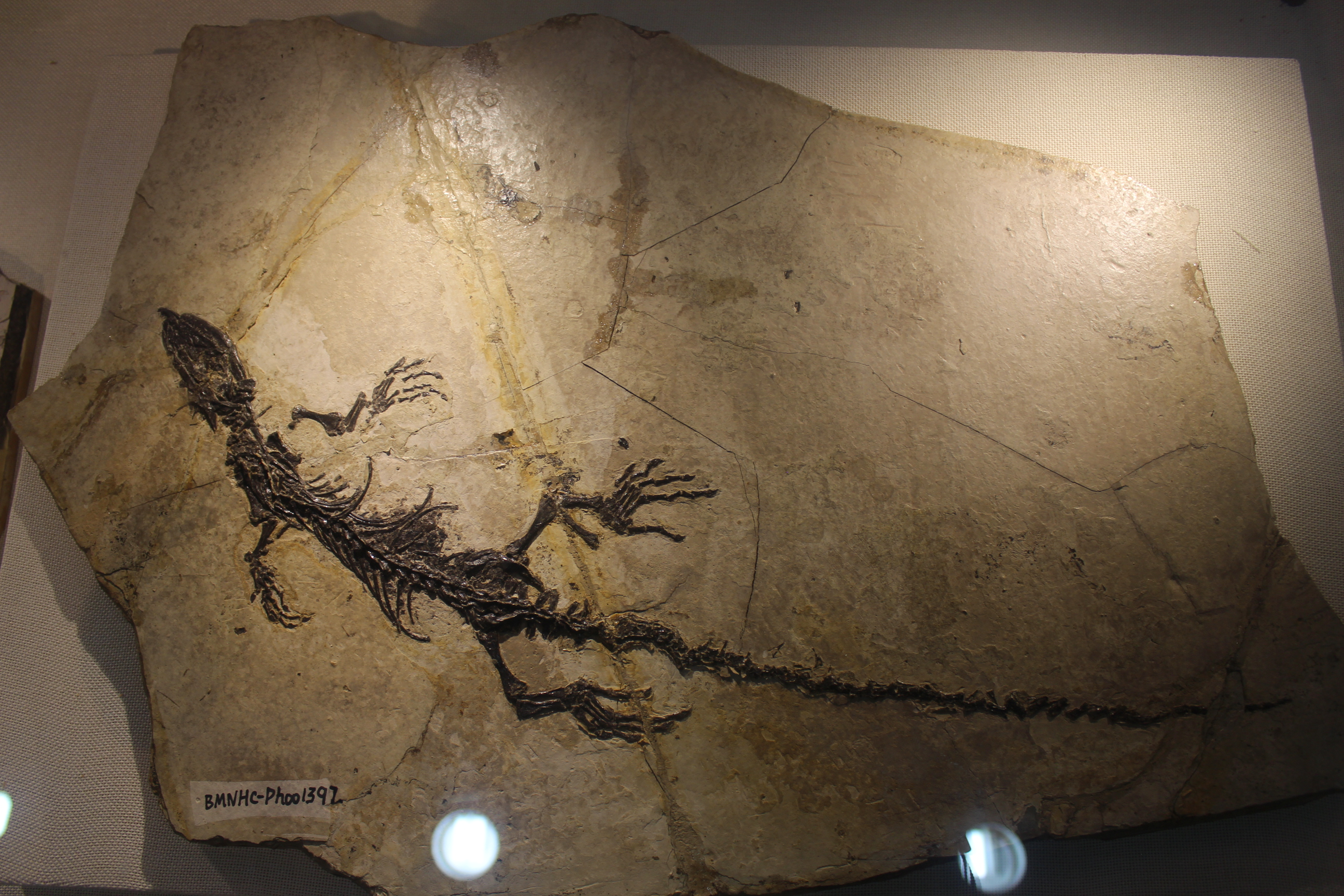
- Fossil of Yabeinosaurus, Beijing Museum of Natural History

Scientific classification
- Kingdom: Animalia
- Phylum: Chordata
- Class: Reptilia
- Order: Squamata
- Clade: Scleroglossa (?)
- Genus: †Yabeinosaurus; Endo and Shikama, 1942

Type species
- †Yabeinosaurus tenuis (nomen dubium) Endo and Shikama, 1942

Species
- †Yabeinosaurus bicuspidens Dong et al., 2017; †Yabeinosaurus robustus Dong et al., 2017

= Yabeinosaurus =

Yabeinosaurus Temporal range: Early Cretaceous Barremian–Aptian

Extinct genus of lizards

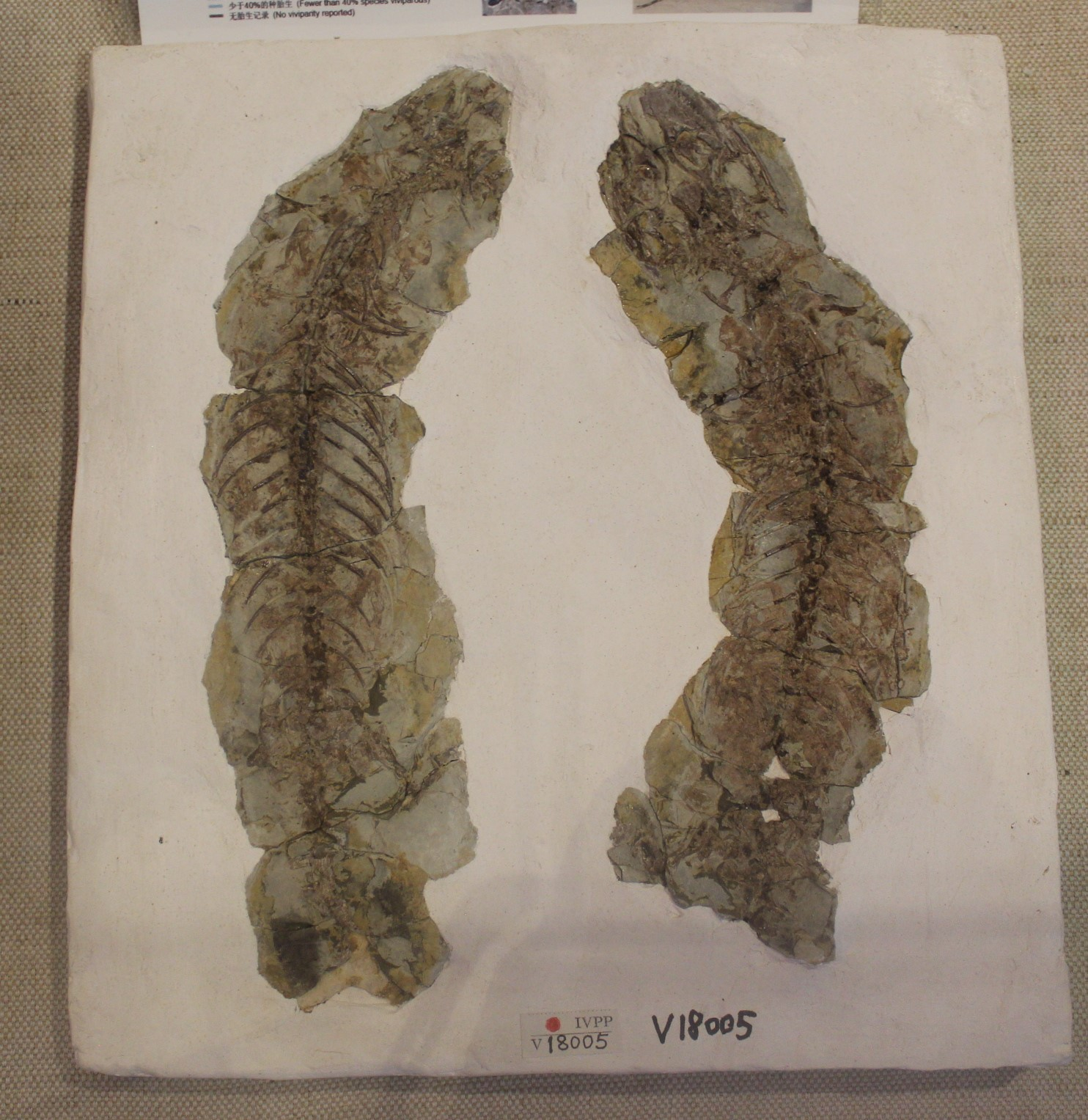
IVPP V18005, a specimen preserved with over 15 embryos inside it, Paleozoological Museum of China

Yabeinosaurus is an extinct genus of lizard from the Early Cretaceous Jehol Group of northeastern China. The type species Yabeinosaurus tenuis is known from many well-preserved skeletons belonging to both juvenile and adult individuals.

For about 60 years Yabeinosaurus was known only from juvenile specimens, leading scientists to believe that it was a small lizard with weakly developed bones. Because of this, it was thought to be closely related to geckos. Larger specimens up to 35 centimetres (14 in) snout‐vent length were first described in 2005, showing that Yabeinosaurus was a relatively large lizard when fully grown.

Recent phylogenetic analyses indicate that Yabeinosaurus is not closely related to geckos but rather a very basal ("primitive") lizard close to the split between Iguania and Scleroglossa, one of the earliest divergences in the evolutionary history of lizards. Whether or not it lies outside this split or within Scleroglossa is uncertain.

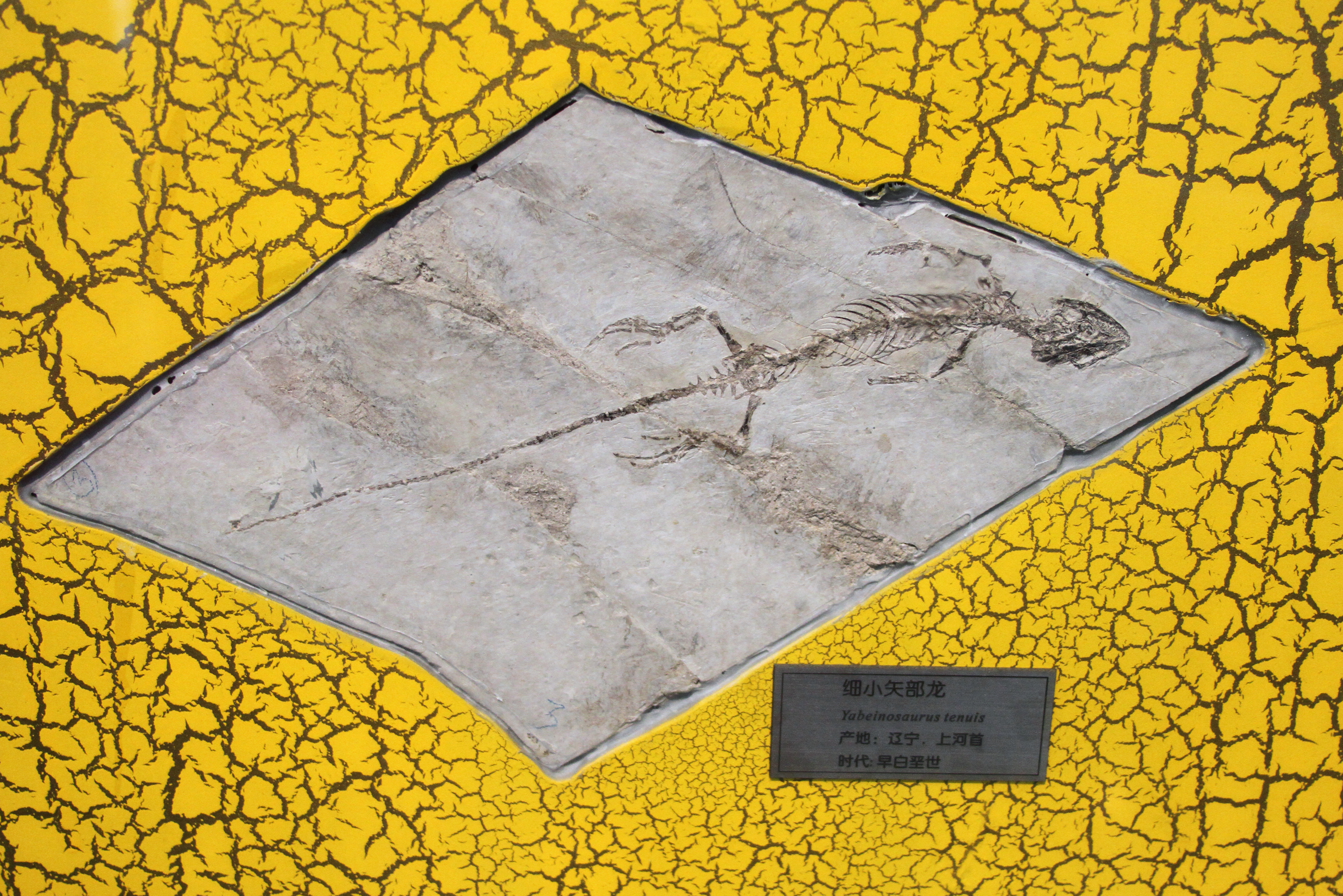
Fossil of Yabeinosaurus in the Beijing Museum of Natural History

In 2011 a fossil of Yabeinosaurus was discovered with 15 well-developed embryos inside it, making it the oldest fossil of a pregnant, viviparous (live-bearing) lizard yet discovered.
