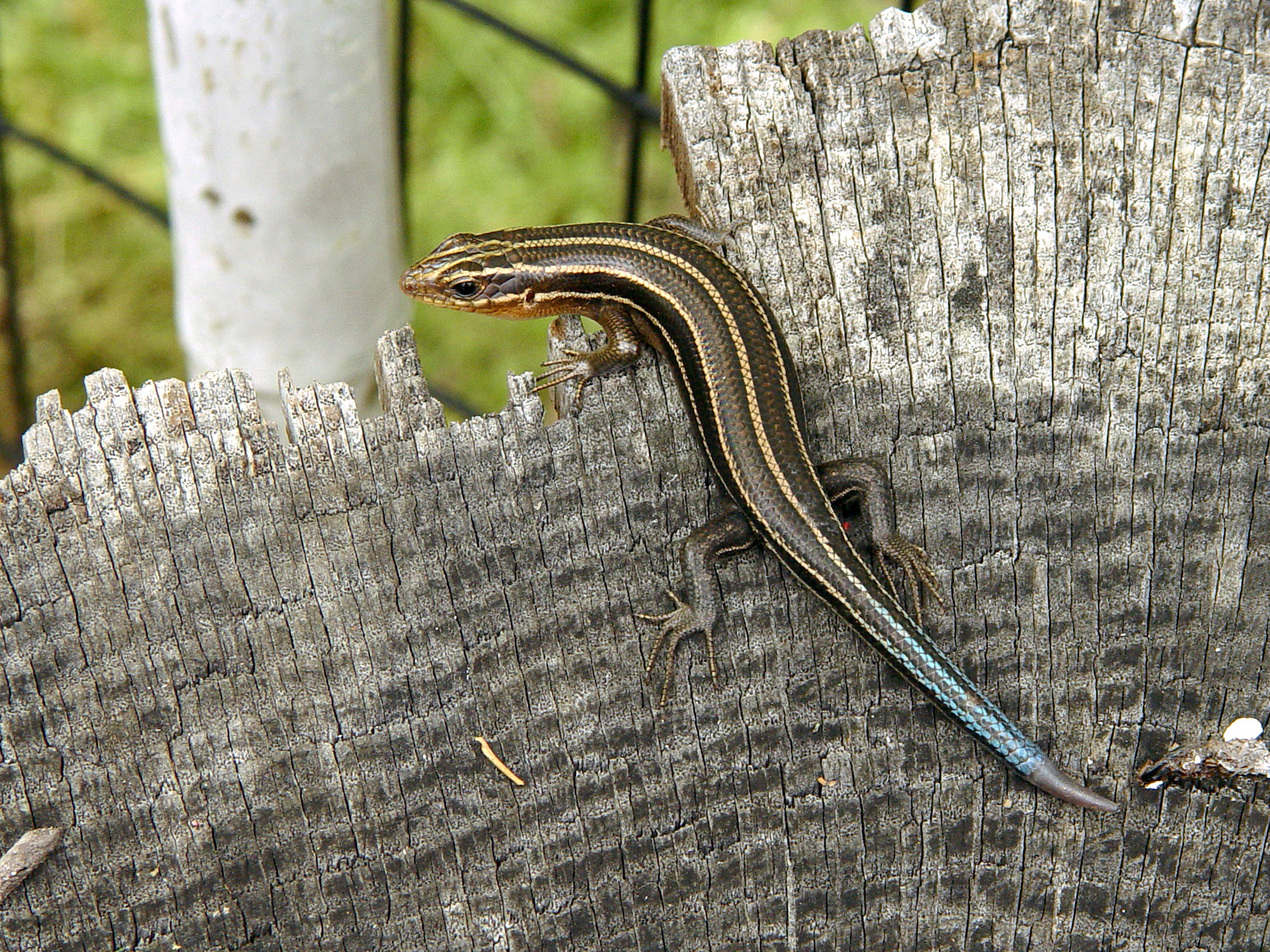
- American five-lined skink (Plestiodon fasciatus)

Scientific classification (obsolete)
- Kingdom: Animalia
- Phylum: Chordata
- Class: Reptilia
- Order: Squamata
- Clade: Scleroglossa
- Clade: Autarchoglossa; Wagler, 1830

Subdivisions
- Anguidae; Anniellidae; Cordylidae; Gerrhosauridae; Gymnophthalmidae; Helodermatidae; Lacertidae; Lanthanotidae; Scincidae; Teiidae; Varanidae; Xantusiidae; Xenosauridae

Cladistically included but traditionally excluded taxa
- Iguania

= Autarchoglossa =

Clade of lizards

Autarchoglossa is a previously recognized suborder of squamates that includes skinks, anguimorphs, snakes, and relatives.

The recent proposal of the Toxicofera clade places Iguania within Autarchoglossa, which may lead to confusion as Autarchoglossa means "free-tongued", and iguanians do not have this feature. To circumvent this, it has been proposed that Autarchoglossa be renamed to Unidentata (single egg-tooth, a feature both groups share) and be redefined to include Iguania.

The following are families classified under the old definition of Autarchoglossa (excluding Iguania):

- Anguidae Gray, 1825 – alligator lizards, anguids, galliwasps, glass lizards
- Anniellidae Nopcsa 1928 – legless lizards
- Cordylidae Mertens, 1937 – girdle-tailed lizards
- Gerrhosauridae Fitzinger, 1843 - plated lizards
- Gymnophthalmidae Merrem, 1820 - spectacled lizards
- Helodermatidae Gray, 1837 – beaded lizards
- Lacertidae Gray, 1825 – wall lizards, Old World racerunners
- Lanthanotidae Steindachner, 1877 – earless monitors
- Scincidae Gray, 1825 – skinks
- Teiidae Gray, 1827 – tegus, junglerunners, ground lizards, New World racerunners, whiptails
- Varanidae Hardwicke & Gray, 1827 – monitors
- Xantusiidae Baird, 1858 – night lizards
- Xenosauridae Cope, 1866 - knob-scaled lizards
