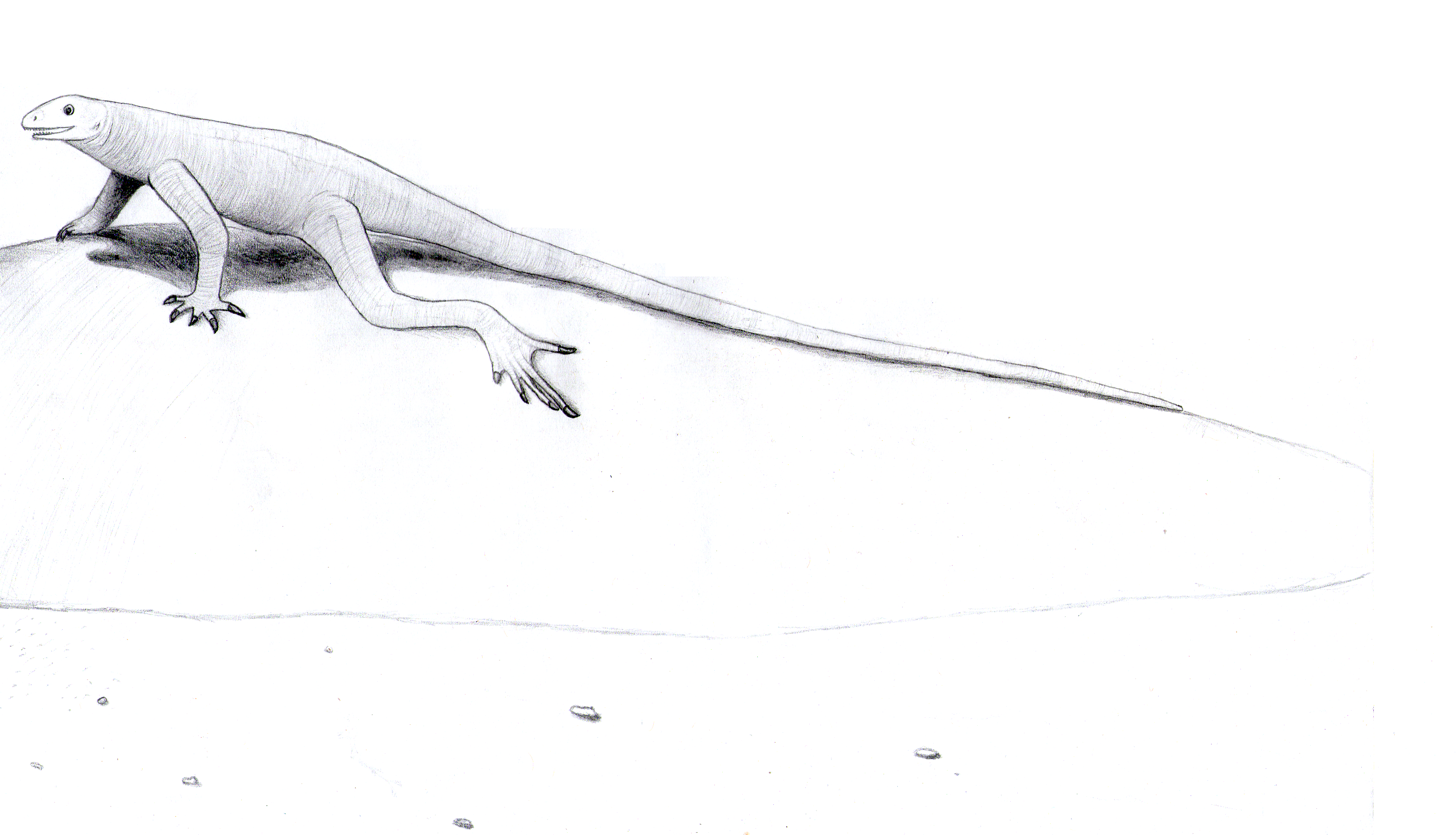
- Life reconstruction

Scientific classification
- Kingdom: Animalia
- Phylum: Chordata
- Class: Reptilia
- Order: Squamata
- Family: †Bavarisauridae
- Genus: †Bavarisaurus; Hoffstetter, 1953
- Species: †B. macrodactylus

Binomial name
- †Bavarisaurus macrodactylus Hoffstetter, 1953

Synonyms
- "Bavariasaurus" (sic); Homoeosaurus macrodactylus Wagner, 1852

= Bavarisaurus =

Bavarisaurus Temporal range: Late Jurassic, Tithonian

Extinct genus of squamate reptile

Bavarisaurus ('Bavarian lizard') is an extinct genus of basal squamate found in the Altmühltal Formation near Bavaria, Germany. It is the only genus in the family Bavarisauridae.

== Discovery and naming ==
The holotype is BSPHM 1873 III, and part of the holotype is now lost. It was initially identified as a species of Homoeosaurus as H. macrodactylus by Wagner (1852). A second partial specimen was tentatively assigned to B. macrospondylus by Ostrom (1978), and Evans (1994) also identified fragmentary skull material belonging to Bavarisaurus.

A fossil skeleton found in the stomach region of a Compsognathus, a small theropod dinosaur, was originally assigned to the genus by Ostrom (1978), but was renamed to Schoenesmahl by Conrad (2018).

== Classification ==
It is the only genus in the Bavarisauridae family.
