= Susan E. Evans =

British palaeontologist and herpetologist

Susan Elizabeth Evans is a British palaeontologist and herpetologist. She is the author or co-author of over 200 peer-reviewed papers and book chapters.

She received a BSc in Zoology at Bedford College in 1974, and in 1977 a PhD in vertebrate palaeontology from the University College London. In 1980 she was Assistant Professor in biology at the University College of Bahrain and went continued as a lecturer in Anatomy at Middlesex Hospital Medical School. She was also Senior Lecturer with the Department of Anatomy and Developmental Biology at the University College, London In 2003, she became a Professor of Vertebrate Morphology and Palaeontology at University College London.

== Research ==
Her research focuses on the evolution of key morphological features in lizards, amphibians and their extinct relatives. In particular the research focuses on the implications of the above with regards to macroevolution, phylogenetic relationships, function, palaeoecology, and biogeography. Along with Michael Benton and Jacques Gauthier, she was one of the pioneers of applying cladistic methodology to reptile (especially Lepidosaurian) evolutionary relationships.

Beginning in 2001, Dr Evans became involved in the Mahajanga Basin Project which was conducted jointly with the University of Antananarivo. In investigating the Maevarano Formation, the researchers established Madagascar as having some of the most complete and scientifically significant fossils of Late Cretaceous vertebrates in the southern hemisphere. Along with her colleague Marc E. H. Jones, Evans worked on the evolutionary relationships of the giant prehistoric frog Beelzebufo ampinga that was discovered by Dr David Krause of Stony Brook University.

Professor Evans is a Fellow of the Linnean Society and a Scientific Fellow of the Zoological Society. Her research has also been supported by the Royal Society, The Leverhulme Trust, the National Geographic Society, and the Biotechnology and Biological Sciences Research Council.

In 2008, a newly described Eocene Agamid lizard Vastanagama susani was named in her honour. The squamatan clade "Evansauria" has also been named after her. In 2024, Martin-Silverstone et al. named the darwinopteran pterosaur species Ceoptera evansae after her.

== Selected bibliography ==
- Evans SE. 1980. The skull of a new eosuchian reptile from the Lower Jurassic of South Wales. Zool. J. Linn. Soc. 70: 203–264.
- Evans SE. 1984. The classification of the Lepidosauria. Zool. J. Linn. Soc. 82: 87–100.
- Evans SE, Milner AR, Musett F. 1988. The earliest known salamanders (Amphibia, Caudata): a record from the Middle Jurassic of England. Geobios 21: 539–552.
- Evans SE 1995 General introduction: heart. Gray's Anatomy, 38th Edition. Churchill Livingstone, pp 1472–1474.
- Evans SE. 2002. Reptiles. In The New Encyclopedia of Reptiles and Amphibians, Halliday T & Adler K (eds). Andromeda Press, Oxford. pp. 98–105.
- Jones MEH, Evans SE, Sigogneau-Russell D. 2003. Cretaceous frogs from Morocco. Annals of the Carnegie Museum 72: 65–97.
- Evans SE. 2008. The skull of lizards and tuatara. In Biology of the Reptilia, Vol.20, Morphology H: the skull of Lepidosauria, Gans C, Gaunt A S, Adler K. (eds). Ithaca, New York, Society for the study of Amphibians and Reptiles.
- Evans SE, Borsuk-Bialynicka M. 2009. [palaeontologia.pan.pl/PP65/PP65_079-106.pdf The Early Triassic stem-frog Czatkobatrachus from Poland]. Palaeontologica Polonica 65: 79–105.
- Evans SE. 2009. An early kuehneosaurid reptile (Reptilia: Diapsida) from the Early Triassic of Poland. Palaeontologica Polonica 65: 145–178.
- Evans SE, Borsuk-Bialynicka M. 2009. A small lepidosauromorph reptile from the Early Triassic of Poland. Palaeontologica Polonica 65: 179–202.
- Borsuk-Bialynicka M, Evans SE. 2009. A long-necked archosauromorph from the Early Triassic of Poland. Palaeontologica Polonica 65: 203–234.
- Borsuk-Bialynicka M, Evans SE. 2009. Cranial and mandibular osteology of the Early Triassic archosauriform Osmolskina czatkowicensis from Poland. Palaeontologica Polonica 65: 235–281.
- Evans SE, Jones MEH. 2010. The Origin, early history and diversification of lepidosauromorph reptiles. In Bandyopadhyay S. (ed.), New Aspects of Mesozoic Biodiversity, 27 Lecture Notes in Earth Sciences 132, 27–44.
- Curtis N, Jones MEH, Lappin AK, Evans SE, O'Higgins P, Fagan MJ. 2010. Comparison between in vivo and theoretical bite performance: Using multi-body modelling to predict muscle and biteforces in a reptile skull. Journal of Biomechanics doi:10.1016/j.jbiomech.2010.05.037
