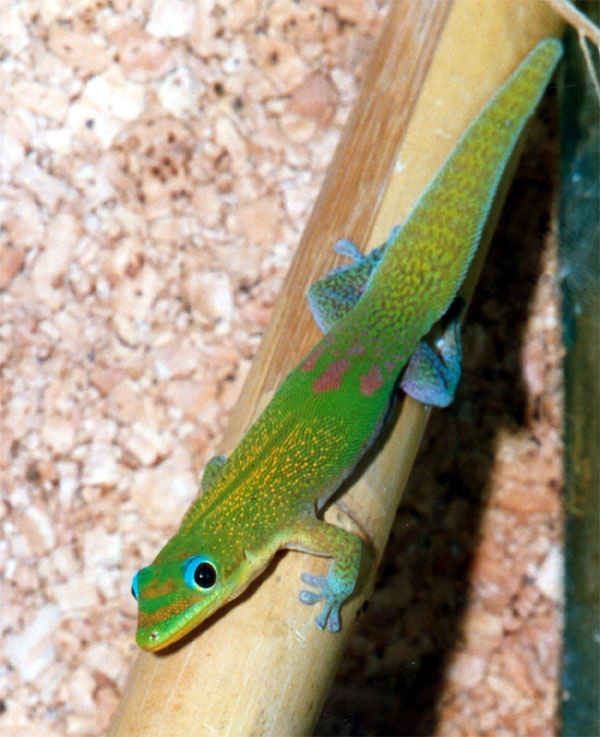
- Gold dust day gecko (also known as Madagascar day geckos)

Scientific classification
- Domain: Eukaryota
- Kingdom: Animalia
- Phylum: Chordata
- Class: Reptilia
- Order: Squamata
- Clade: Scincogekkonomorpha
- Informal group: Scleroglossa; Estes et al., 1988

Subgroups & basal genera
- Amphisbaenia; Anguimorpha; Gekkota; Laterata; Scincomorpha; Serpentes †Indrasaurus

= Scleroglossa =

Scleroglossa Temporal range: Middle Jurassic to present

Evolutionary group of lizards

Scleroglossa is a group of lizards that includes geckos, autarchoglossans (scincomorphs, anguimorphs, snakes and varanoids), and amphisbaenians. Scleroglossa is supported by phylogenetic analyses that use morphological features (visible anatomical features). According to most morphological analyses, Scleroglossa is the sister group of the clade Iguania,^{[a]} which includes iguanas, chameleons, agamids, and New World lizards. Together, Scleroglossa and Iguania make up the crown group Squamata, the smallest evolutionary grouping to include all living lizards and snakes.

The name Scleroglossa is derived from the Greek, skleros, meaning "hard" and glossa, meaning "tongue". The split between Scleroglossa and Iguania can be based on features of the tongue; iguanians have a muscular tongue and use lingual prehension to capture food, whereas scleroglossans have hard tongues and use teeth-and-jaw prehension to capture food, freeing the tongue for chemosensory activity.

Recent phylogenetic analyses based on molecular data (such as DNA sequences) nest iguanians deeper within Squamata along with snakes and anguimorphs. Under this phylogeny, Scleroglossa is not a valid grouping. A new clade Bifurcata (bifurcated tongue) has been proposed to include Iguania as a sister taxon to Anguimorpha.

== Notes ==
1. Many studies also recognize a clade called Scincogekkonomorpha, which is a stem-based taxon defined to include all lizards more closely related to geckos and skinks than to iguanas. Scleroglossa was first established as a node-based taxon, defined to include Gekkota and Autarchoglossa. Therefore, Scincogekkonomorpha rather than Scleroglossa is the proper sister taxon of Iguania.
