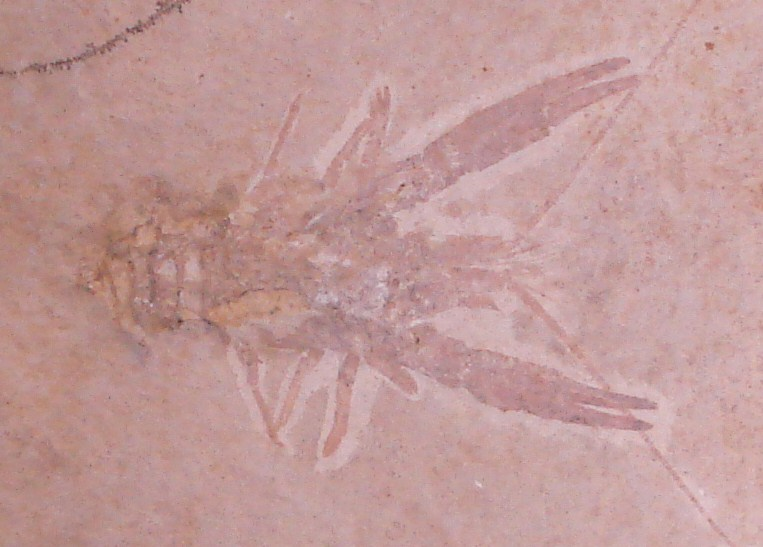
- Fossil of P. pustulosus at the Jura Museum

Scientific classification
- Kingdom: Animalia
- Phylum: Arthropoda
- Clade: Pancrustacea
- Class: Malacostraca
- Order: Decapoda
- Suborder: Pleocyemata
- Family: †Stenochiridae
- Genus: †Pseudastacus; Oppel, 1861

Type species
- †Bolina pustulosa Münster, 1839

Species
- †P. lemovices (Charbonnier & Audo, 2020); †P. minor? (Fraas, 1878); †P. mucronatus? (Phillips, 1835); †P. pusillus? (Van Straelen, 1925); †P. pustulosus (Münster, 1839)

Synonyms
- Synonyms of Pseudastacus: Alvis (Münster, 1840); Bolina (Münster, 1839); Synonyms of P. pustulosus: Alvis octopus (Münster, 1840); Bolina pustulosa (Münster, 1839); Pseudastacus muensteri (Oppel, 1861); Synonyms of P. mucronatus: Astacus mucronatus (Phillips, 1835)

= Pseudastacus =

Pseudastacus Temporal range: Sinemurian–Cenomanian

Extinct genus of crustaceans that lived during the Mesozoic era

Pseudastacus (meaning 'false Astacus', in comparison to the extant crayfish genus) is an extinct genus of decapod crustaceans that lived during the Jurassic period in Europe, and possibly the Cretaceous period in Lebanon. Many species have been assigned to it, though the placement of some species remains uncertain and others have been reassigned to different genera. Fossils attributable to this genus were first described by Georg zu Münster in 1839 under the name Bolina pustulosa, but the generic name was changed in 1861 after Albert Oppel noted that it was preoccupied. The genus has been placed into different families by numerous authors, historically being assigned to Nephropidae or Protastacidae. Currently, it is believed to be a member of Stenochiridae.

Reaching up to 6 cm (2.4 in) in total length, Pseudastacus individuals were small animals. Members of this genus have a crayfish-like build, possessing long antennae, a triangular rostrum and a frontmost pair of appendages enlarged into long and narrow pincers. Deep grooves are present on the carapace, which is around the same length as the abdomen. The surface of the carapace is usually uneven, with either small tubercles or pits. Sexual dimorphism is known in P. pustulosus, with the pincers of females being more elongated than those of the males. There is evidence of possible gregarious behavior in P. lemovices in the form of multiple individuals preserved alongside each other, possibly killed in a mass mortality event. With the oldest known record dating to the Sinemurian age of the Early Jurassic, and possible species surviving into the Cenomanian stage of the Late Cretaceous, Pseudastacus has a long temporal range and was a widespread taxon. Fossils of these animals were first found in the Solnhofen Limestone of Germany, but have also been recorded from France, England and Lebanon. All species in this genus lived in marine environments.

== Discovery and naming ==
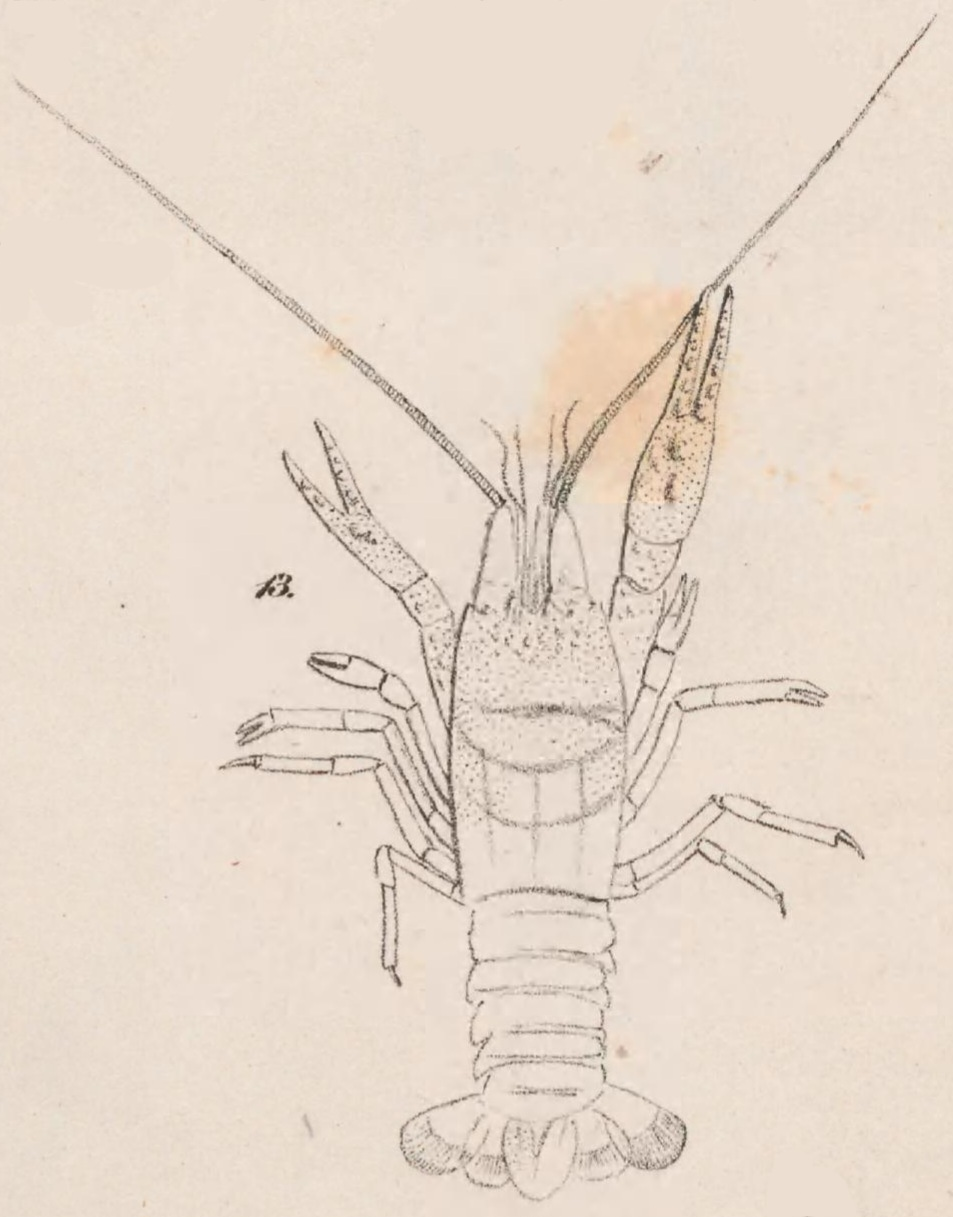
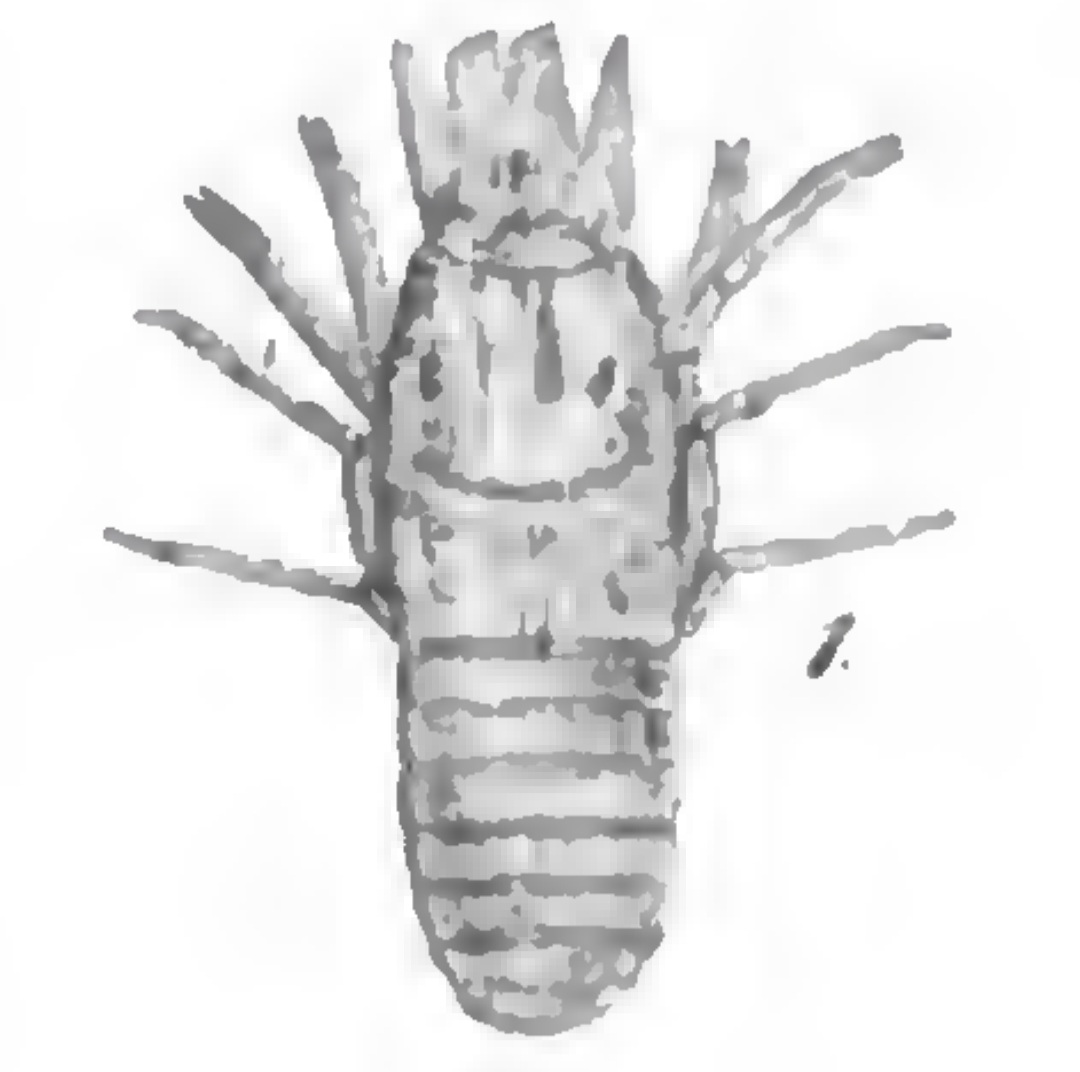
Figure drawn by Münster in 1839 (left) labelled as Bolina pustulosa, and fossil of P. pustulosus (right) as illustrated in Münster's 1840 paper, originally labelled as Alvis octopus

Fossils of Pseudastacus had been described prior to the naming of this genus, under other names which are currently invalid. In 1839, German paleontologist Georg zu Münster established the genus Bolina to include two species, B. pustulosa (the type species) and B. angusta, both of which are based on specimens collected from the Solnhofen Limestone. The generic name references the nymph Bolina from Greek mythology, who threw herself into the sea. A year later, Münster described several fossils from the Solnhofen Limestone he believed to represent isopods, and erected the genus Alvis to contain the single species A. octopus, naming it after the dwarf Alvíss from Norse mythology.

In 1861, German paleontologist Albert Oppel placed B. pustulosa and B. angusta into two new genera, Pseudastacus and Stenochirus respectively. Now renamed as Pseudastacus pustulosus and Stenochirus angustus, the two species became the type species of their own respective genera. This was done because the name Bolina had already been assigned to both a gastropod and a ctenophore, thus the crustacean named by Münster had to be renamed. The name Pseudastacus combines the Greek word ψεύδος (pseudos, meaning 'false') and Astacus, referencing its resemblance to the modern crayfish genus. Oppel declared that 10 specimens known at the time represented P. pustulosus, one of which was from the Redenbacher collection of the Berlin Natural History Museum and the remaining nine were from the collection of the Palaeontological Museum, Munich. His analysis also found that the specimen named as Alvis octopus by Münster was not an isopod, but essentially identical to P. pustulosus, and therefore synonymized the two species. In addition, he identified one specimen (BSPG AS I 672) housed in the Palaeontological Museum as a second species of the genus which he named P. muensteri.

In 2006, Alessandro Garassino and Guenter Schweigert reviewed the decapod fossils from Solnhofen and found that four of the P. pustulosus specimens from Oppel's collection were still present, and that P. muensteri represents female specimens of P. pustulosus (thus being a junior synonym).

=== Species ===
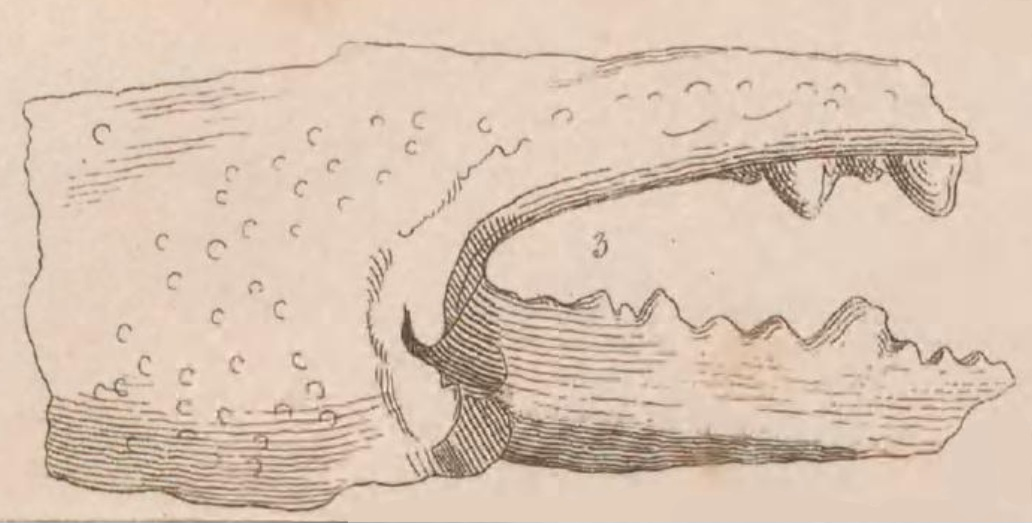
Illustration made in 1835 of the P. mucronatus type specimen

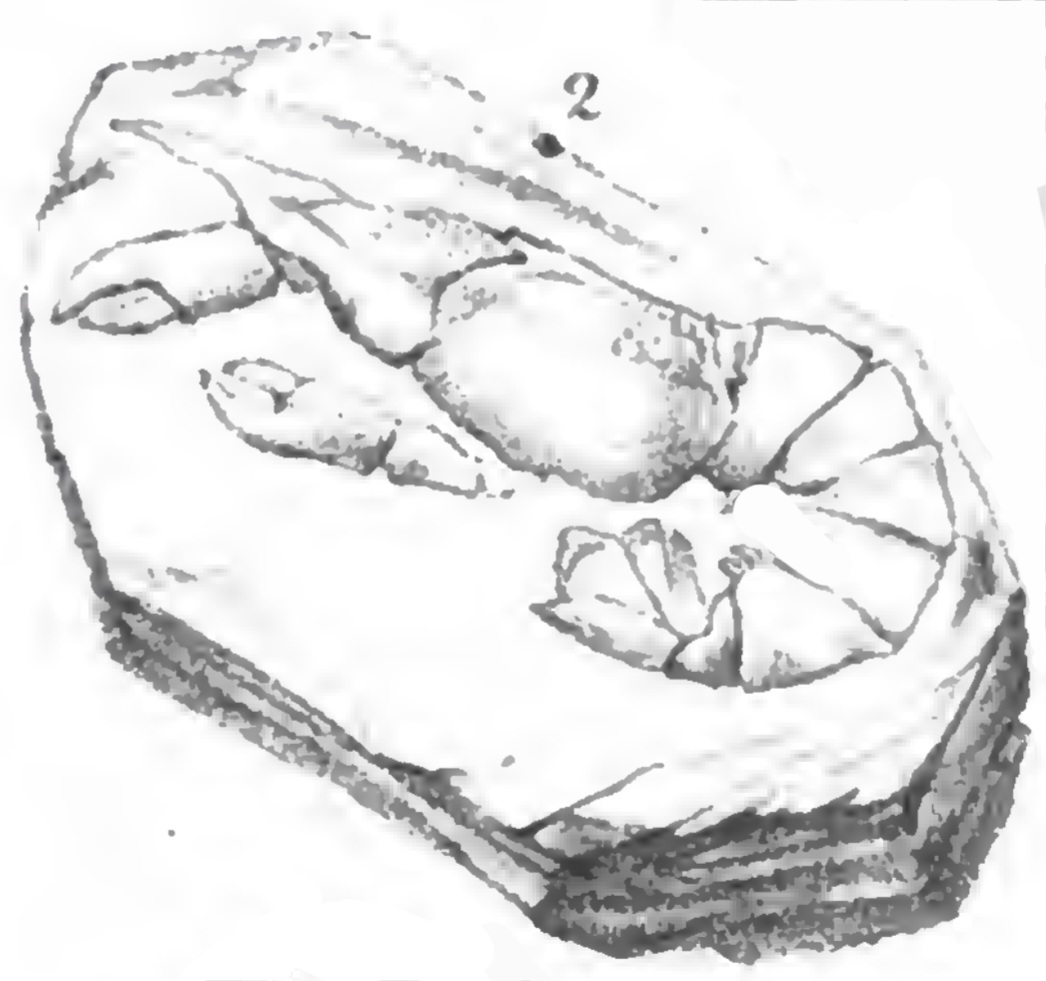
Illustration made in 1878 of the currently-lost P. minor type specimen

Several species have been assigned to the genus Pseudastacus, though the placement of some species remains uncertain or tentative. In addition, some have since been moved into different genera after it was discovered that they were not closely related to the type species. A 2020 revision by Sylvain Charbonnier and Denis Audo retained five species within the genus Pseudastacus:

- P. pustulosus is the type species of the genus, first named as Bolina pustulosa by Münster in 1839 and renamed in 1861. Its fossils were found in the Solnhofen Limestone of Germany, which date back to the Tithonian stage of the Late Jurassic period.
- P. mucronatus was originally named as Astacus mucronatus by English geologist John Phillips in 1835. The type specimen was extracted from the Speeton Clay Formation in Yorkshire, England, and is a fragment of the pincer. The pincer is very large, with alternating large and small tubercles on the inner margins. This is unlike the narrower and longer pincers of other Pseudastacus species, and the specimen may be referrable to Hoploparia dentata.
- P. minor was described by German clergyman, paleontologist and geologist Oscar Fraas in 1878 from a specimen found in Cenomanian-aged deposits in Hakel, Lebanon. This specimen is now lost and only the original illustration remains, which shows features unlike any other Pseudastacus species: the rostrum is extremely long, there is an additional abdomen segment, the clawed limbs are placed further back and the general pincer shape is different. Its placement in this genus is thus uncertain.
- P. pusillus is based on a fossilized cephalothorax from the Bajocian-aged deposits of May-sur-Orne, France, described in 1925 by Belgian carcinologist and paleontologist Victor van Straelen. The fossil was destroyed in World War II and it is difficult to tell from the original line drawing of the specimen whether this species truly belongs to Pseudastacus.
- P. lemovices was named in 2020 based on five specimens preserved on a slab of Sinemurian-aged limestone, collected from Chauffour-sur-Vell, France. The specific name honors the Lemovices, a Gallic tribe that lived near this locality. It is the oldest known species of the family Stenochiridae.

=== Reassigned species ===
The following species were formerly placed in Pseudastacus, but have since been moved to different genera.

- P. hakelensis was first named as Homarus hakelensis in 1878. The species lived during the Cenomanian stage in Lebanon. It was moved to Notahomarus in 2017.
- P. dubertreti, described in 1946 from a fossil found in Lebanon and kept in the National Museum of Natural History, France, lived during the Cenomanian stage. Later study of the fossil found this species to be synonymous with Carpopenaeus callirostris in 2006.
- P. llopisi was named in 1971 and is known from numerous specimens found in the Early Cretaceous-aged site of Las Hoyas, Spain. In 1997 it was reassigned to the genus Austropotamobius.

== Description ==
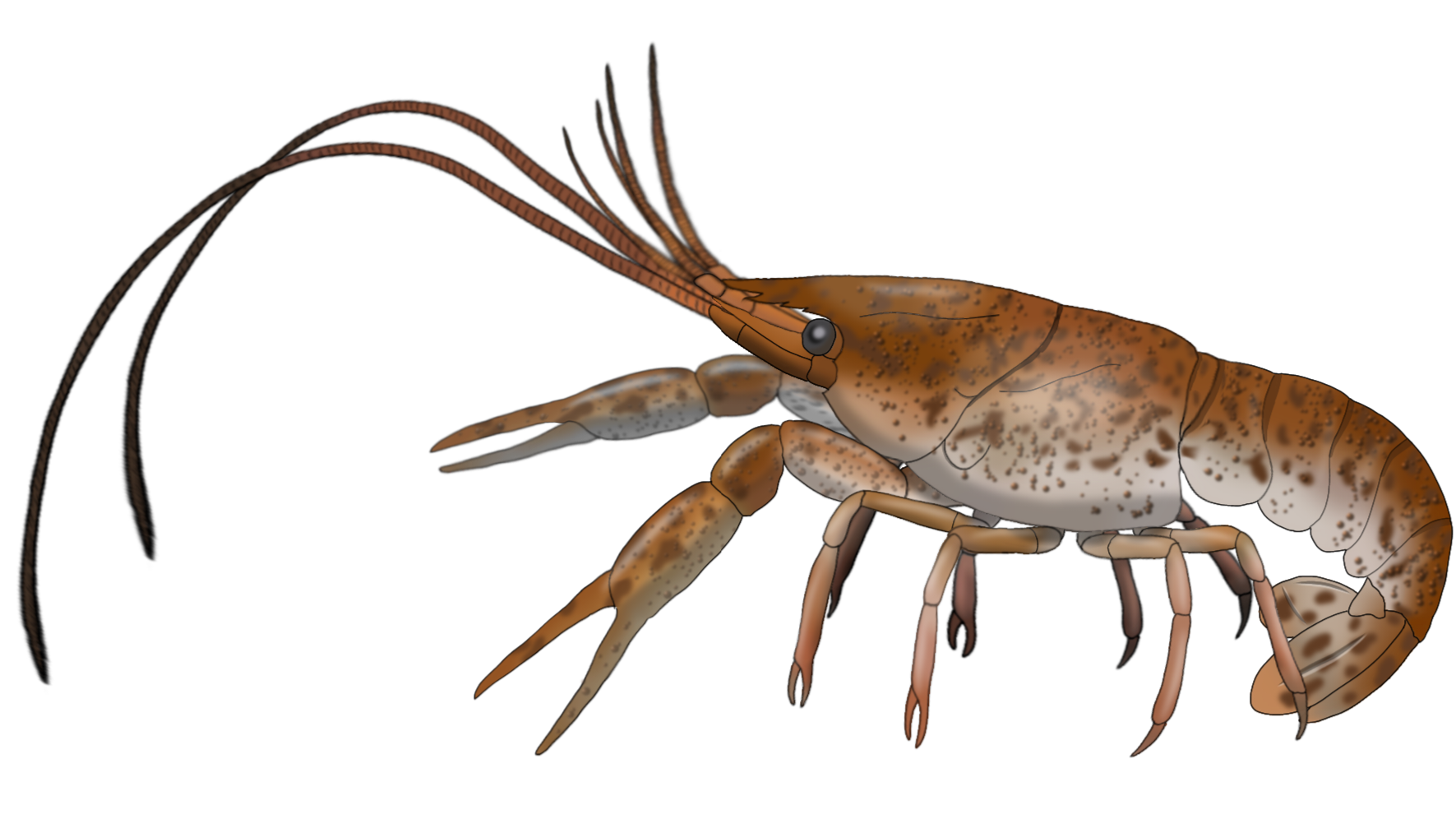
Life restoration of P. pustulosus with speculative coloration

Pseudastacus is a small crustacean, with the known specimens of P. pustulosus ranging from 4–6 cm (1.6–2.4 in) in total length. The carapace of P. lemovices reaches a length of 11 mm (0.43 in) excluding the rostrum, and a height of 6.5 mm (0.26 in).

Members of this genus often have an uneven carapace surface, with some species (such as P. pustulosus) having tubercles and others (such as P. lemovices) having pits distributed uniformly across the carapace surface. Individuals with smoother carapaces are also documented, though this may be due to abrasion. Grooves are present on the carapace, including a deep, arch-shaped cervical groove that stretches across the top of the carapace, linking to similarly deep gastroorbital, antennal and hepatic grooves at the sides. A weaker additional groove (the postcervical groove) lies behind the cervical groove on either side. The rostrum is triangular and elongated, with three spines on the sides. The carapace and head are separated by an arch-shaped depression. A pair of long antennae and two pairs of shorter antennules extend from the head, with the outer antennules being slightly narrower and more pointed than the inner pair. A pair of compound eyes are attached to the head by short eye stalks.

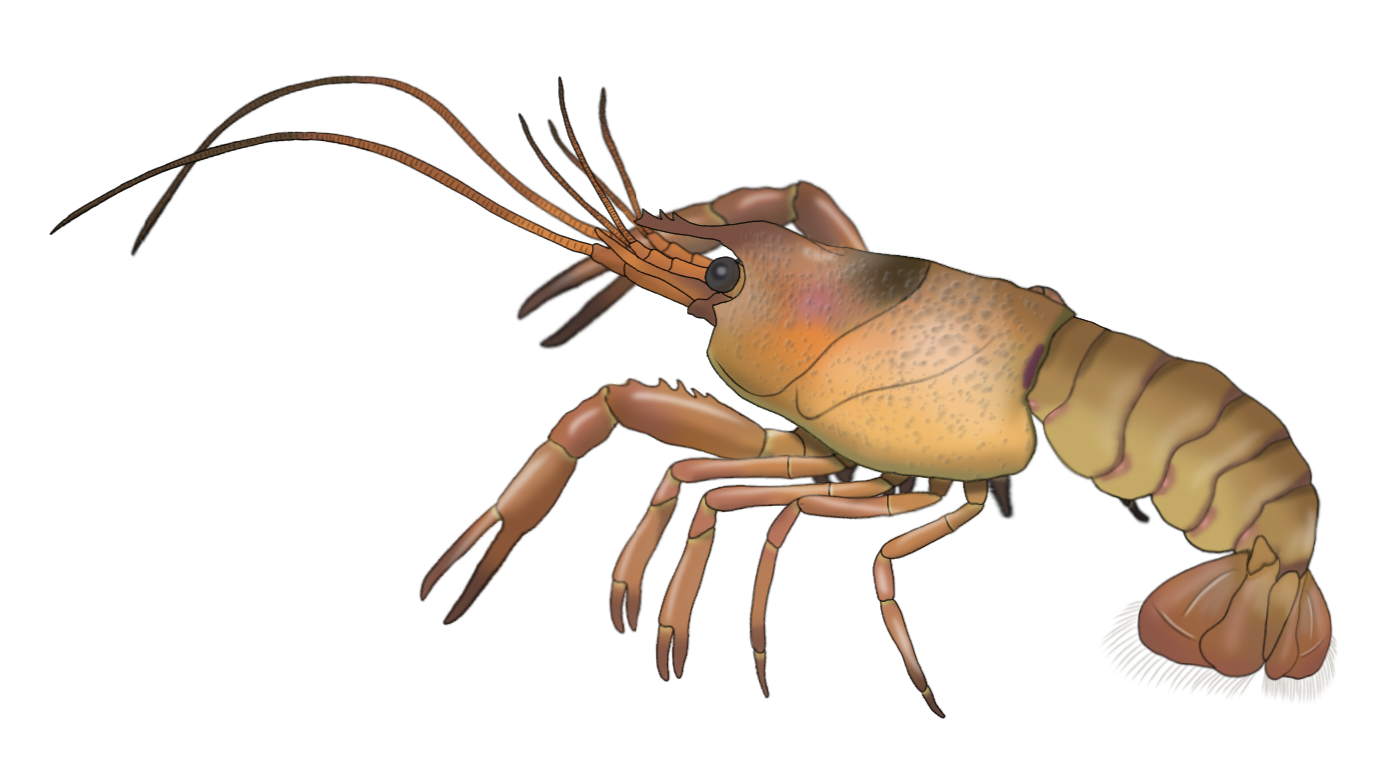
Life restoration of P. lemovices with speculative coloration

The thorax bears five pairs of appendages known as pereiopods (walking legs). The first three pairs of pereiopods terminate with chelae (pincers), and the pair furthest front is particularly long and enlarged. Though ornamented with tubercles in P. pustulosus, the pincers are smooth and undecorated in P. lemovices. The pereiopods decrease in size the further back they are placed, the pair furthest front being largest and longest. The abdomen is around the length of the carapace, with the frontmost segment being the smallest. The uropods (tail appendages) are equal in length, with a ridge down the middle. Long setae (bristles) are preserved on the uropod margins of P. lemovices.

== Classification ==
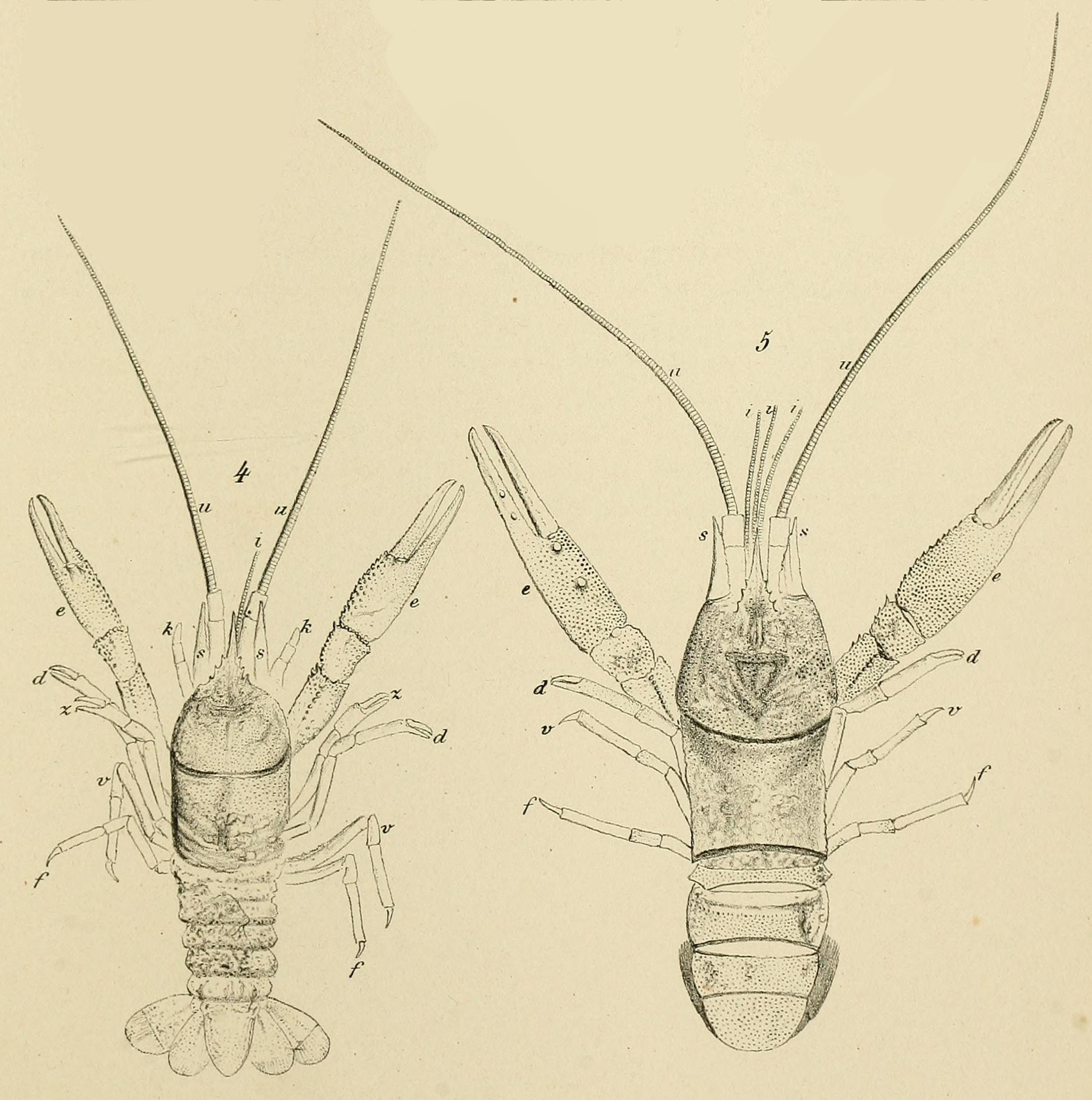
Illustrations of P. pustulosus made in 1862

In the years since it was first discovered, Pseudastacus has been placed in a variety of families by different authors. For many decades, the genus was thought to be a member of Nephropidae (the lobster family), as first reported by Victor van Straelen in 1925. This placement was followed by subsequent authors such as Beurlen (1928), Glaessner (1929), and Chong & Förster (1976). In 1983, Henning Albrecht erected the family Protastacidae and moved Pseudastacus into it, whereas Tshudy & Babcock (1997) included the genus into their newly-established family Chilenophoberidae. Although Garassino & Schweigert (2006) continued to place Pseudastacus in Proastacidae following Albrecht (1983), other authors in the 2000s would place it in Chilenophoberidae based on the more recent findings of Tshudy & Babcock (1997).

In 2013, Karasawa and colleagues recovered Pseudastacus as the sister taxon to Stenochirus, making Chilenophoberidae a paraphyletic group. The family was therefore synonymized with Stenochiridae. The following cladogram shows the placement of Pseudastacus within Stenochiridae according to the study:

- Stenochiridae
  - - - Stenochirus
      - Pseudastacus
    - Chilenophoberus
  - Palaeophoberus
  - Tillocheles

== Paleobiology ==
=== Sexual dimorphism ===
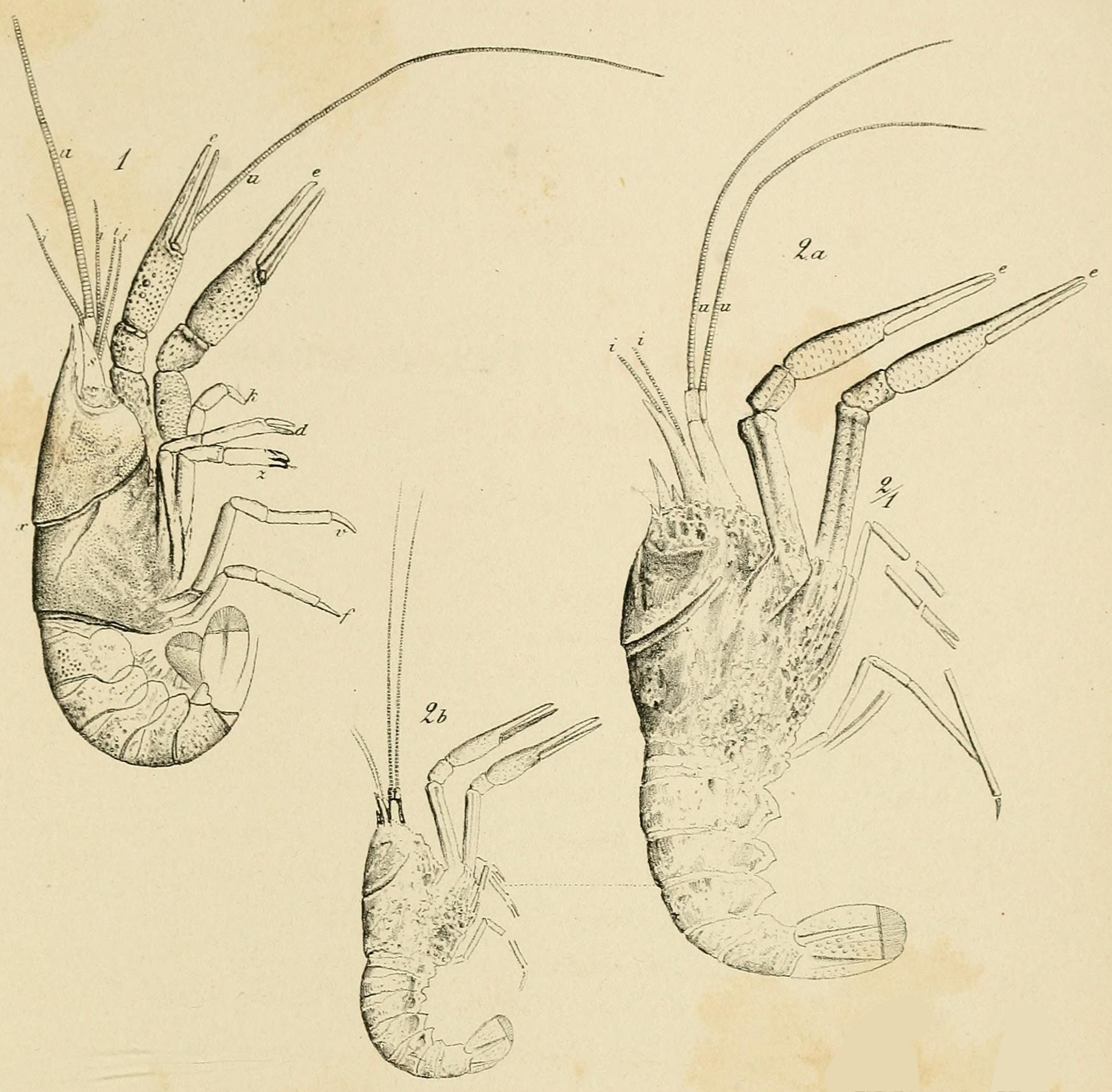
Illustrations made in 1862 of male (left) and female (center and right) P. pustulosus, originally labeling the females as P. muensteri

Albert Oppel noticed that Pseudastacus fossils from the Solnhofen Limestone could be divided into two morphs; aside from those most similar to the P. pustulosus type specimen, there was also one with a smaller body and longer, more slender claws. Oppel believed the latter morph to be a separate species which he named P. muensteri in 1862. Over a century later, Garassino and Schweigert (2006) found that specimens of P. muensteri were essentially identical to P. pustulosus aside from the claw form. In addition, they noted that in fossil glypheids and the extant Neoglyphea inopinata, the females possess longer clawed limbs than the males. Based on this, they declared P. muensteri as a junior synonym of P. pustulosus, and actually represents a female specimen of this species which was sexually dimorphic.

=== Social behavior ===
The type series of P. lemovices consists of five individuals preserved together in a single limestone slab, possibly indicating that the species exhibited gregarious behaviour, with this group being killed in a mass mortality event (perhaps caused by temperature changes or lack of oxygen). Evidence of gregarious behaviour is also known in other fossil lobsters, as well as in extant species.

== Paleoenvironment ==
=== Early Jurassic ===
Pseudastacus is believed to have first evolved during the Early Jurassic, with P. lemovices being the oldest member of the genus currently known. The five known specimens of this species were preserved in a single limestone slab collected from a garden in Chauffour-sur-Vell, France. The sediment in this locality represents a marine environment dating back to the Sinemurian age (between 199.5 and 192.9 million years ago), and the general area has been specifically dated to the late Sinemurian based on the presence of the green alga Palaeodasycladus mediterraneus in a regional bed.

=== Late Jurassic ===
Pseudastacus pustulosus, the type species of the genus, is known from the most specimens. All known remains of this species were collected from the Solnhofen Limestone of Bavaria, Germany, which dates to the Tithonian age of the Late Jurassic period, between 149.2 and 145 million years ago. During the time of deposition, the European continent was partly inundated, forming a dry, tropical archipelago at the edge of the Tethys Ocean. The Solnhofen Limestone would have been laid down in a lagoonal environment cut off from the main ocean by reefs. A coastal habitat is further confirmed by the fossil content of the area, which includes numerous marine species that P. pustulosus would have lived alongside. These include cephalopods (such as ammonoids and belemnites), crinoids (such as Saccocoma), other crustaceans (including eryonids, axiids, glypheids, mantis shrimp, and the closely related Stenochirus), fish (such as pycnodonts, pachycormids, aspidorhynchids and caturids) and marine reptiles (such as turtles, ichthyosaurs and metriorhynchids). Remains of terrestrial animals, though rarer, are also present and represent species that would have lived on the islands surrounded by the lagoons, including dinosaurs (such as Archaeopteryx and Compsognathus), lizards (such as Ardeosaurus, Bavarisaurus and Schoenesmahl), and pterosaurs (such as Rhamphorhynchus, Aurorazhdarcho, Pterodactylus, Germanodactylus, Ctenochasma and Scaphognathus).

=== Cretaceous ===
Two Pseudastacus species, P. mucronatus and P. minor, originate from deposits dating to the Cretaceous period, though their assignment to this genus remains uncertain. These two species did not coexist, being from different stages of the Cretaceous as well as different locations. Known remains of P. mucronatus have been collected from the Speeton Clay Formation in England, which extends from the Berriasian to Aptian ages of the Early Cretaceous (145 to 113 million years ago). The formation was a marine environment that was initially deposited during a period of low sea level, and the sea level later fluctuated greatly over the course of the formation's deposition, representing events of marine transgression and regression. This is reflected by the foraminifera assemblage, and Plymouth Sound has been proposed as a modern analogue for the formation. Fossilized remains of various marine animals are preserved in the Speeton Clay Formation, with those of belemnites being the most abundant. Ammonites, crustaceans, and the teeth of sharks and rays (including Cretorectolobus, Spathobatis, Dasyatis and Synechodus) are also commonly recorded from these deposits.

Known from a single (currently missing) specimen from the Cenomanian-aged (between 100.5 and 93.9 million-year-old) marine deposits of Lebanon, P. minor would be the geologically youngest species of Pseudastacus, assuming it does belong to the genus. During this age, Lebanon was located on a large carbonate platform mostly submerged in the Neotethys Ocean, and located near the northeastern edge of the Afro-Arabian continent. Plant fossils from Cenomanian Lebanese deposits (including gymnosperms and deciduous angiosperms) indicate a similar climate to the modern-day Mediterranean Basin, and are similar to floral assemblages from contemporary Crimea, North America and Central Europe. The paleontological sites of Lebanon have yielded many well-preserved fossils, including a wide variety of fish, crustaceans and even octopuses. Terrestrial insects and reptiles (including pterosaurs and squamates) are also represented in the fossil finds from these deposits.
