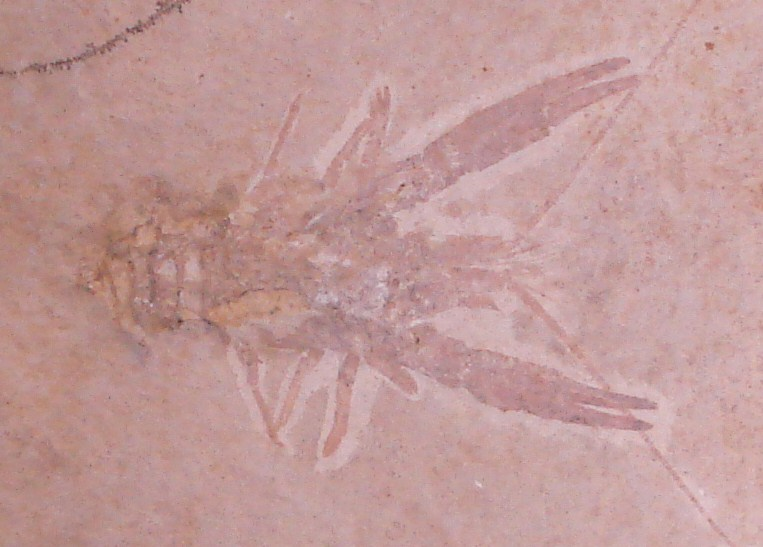
- Fossil of Pseudastacus pustulosus

Scientific classification
- Kingdom: Animalia
- Phylum: Arthropoda
- Clade: Pancrustacea
- Class: Malacostraca
- Order: Decapoda
- Suborder: Pleocyemata
- Infraorder: Astacidea
- Superfamily: †Stenochiroidea; Beurlen, 1928
- Family: †Stenochiridae; Beurlen, 1928

Genera
- †Chilenophoberus; †Palaeophoberus; †Pseudastacus; †Stenochirus; †Tillocheles

Synonyms
- Chilenophoberidae Tshudy and Babcock, 1997

= Stenochiridae =

Stenochiridae Temporal range: Sinemurian–Turonian

Family of crustaceans

Stenochiridae is a family of fossil decapod crustaceans which lived from the early Jurassic to late Cretaceous periods. It is the only family in the superfamily Stenochiroidea. Fossils of stenochirids are known from Europe, Japan, Chile and Australia.

== Classification ==
Georg zu Münster was the first to publish on fossils of stenochirids, describing several fossil specimens collected from the Solnhofen Limestone in 1839, though the family would not be named until much later. He erected the genus Bolina to which he assigned two species, Bolina pustulosa and Bolina angusta. However, Albert Oppel noted in 1861 that this genus name was preoccupied by a cnidarian, and split the two species into separate genera, renaming them as Pseudastacus pustulosus and Stenochirus angustus.

The family Stenochiridae was first established decades later in 1928 by Karl Beurlen, named after the type genus Stenochirus. Beurlen placed only the genus Stenochirus into the Stenochiridae, rendering the family monotypic. In 1997, Tshudy and Babcock erected the new family Chilenophoberidae, of which Chilenophoberus was the type genus and three other genera (Pseudastacus, Palaeophoberus and Tillocheles) were assigned to. In 2013, a study on the phylogeny of lobsters by Karasawa et al. found that Stenochirus and Pseudastacus were sister taxa, which would make Chilenophoberidae a paraphyletic taxon with Stenochiridae nested within. Because the latter family was named first, Chilenophoberidae became a junior synonym of Stenochiridae.

Stenochiridae is the sister clade to Nephropidae (the family containing true lobsters), and both belong to the infraorder Astacidea. The cladogram below shows the placement of Stenochiridae within Astacidea, from analysis by Karasawa et al. (2013):

- - Astacidea
    - - - Parastacidae
        - Astacoidea
          - - Cricoidoscelosidae
            - Cambaridae
          - Astacidae
      - †Protastacidae
    - - Enoplometopoidea
        - Enoplometopidae
        - †Uncinidae
      - - †Stenochiridae
        - Nephropidae

The cladogram below shows the internal relationships of Stenochiridae according to Karasawa et al. (2013):

- Stenochiridae
  - - - Stenochirus
      - Pseudastacus
    - Chilenophoberus
  - Palaeophoberus
  - Tillocheles
