= A. caeca =

A. caeca may refer to:

An abbreviation of a species name. In binomial nomenclature the name of a species is always the name of the genus to which the species belongs, followed by the species name (also called the species epithet). In A. caeca the genus name has been abbreviated to A. and the species has been spelled out in full. In a document that uses this abbreviation it should always be clear from the context which genus name has been abbreviated.

Some of the most common uses of A. caeca are:

- Acanthacaris caeca, a lobster species found in the Caribbean Sea
- Amphisbaena caeca, the Puerto Rican worm lizard, a species of limbless lizard endemic to Puerto Rico

== See also ==
- Caeca (disambiguation)
