= Chilenophoberus =

Chilenophoberus Temporal range: Oxfordian

Scientific classification
- Kingdom: Animalia
- Phylum: Arthropoda
- Clade: Pancrustacea
- Class: Malacostraca
- Order: Decapoda
- Suborder: Pleocyemata
- Family: †Stenochiridae
- Genus: †Chilenophoberus; Chong & Förster, 1976
- Species: †C. atacamensis

Binomial name
- †Chilenophoberus atacamensis Chong & Förster, 1976

Extinct genus of crustaceans

Chilenophoberus is an extinct genus of decapod crustaceans that lived during the Oxfordian stage of the Late Jurassic period in what is now Cordillera de Domeyko, Chile. The genus contains a single species, Chilenophoberus atacamensis.

== Discovery and naming ==
The only known remains of Chilenophoberus were collected from Cordillera de Domeyko, Chile. The genus was erected in 1976 by Chong & Förster, with C. atacamensis as its type and only species. The generic name references its country of origin, Chile, and Acanthacaris (formerly known as Phoberus), which it was once thought to be related to. The specific name refers to the Atacama Desert.

== Classification ==
In their original description of Chilenophoberus, Chong & Förster (1976) recognized the taxon as a relative to Pseudastacus and Palaeophoberus, placing it in the family Nephropidae (which the latter two genera were also placed in at the time). This classification was followed until 1997, when phylogenetic analysis carried out by Tshudy & Babcock found that these genera (as well as Tillocheles) form a family separate from Nephropidae. They named this family Chilenophoberidae, with Chilenophoberus as its type genus.

In 2013, Karasawa et al. declared that Chilenophoberidae was a paraphyletic grouping, with Stenochiridae nested within. Because Stenochiridae was named first, this name took priority and Chilenophoberidae became a junior synonym of it. The following cladogram shows the placement of Chilenophoberus within Stenochiridae according to the study:

- Stenochiridae
  - - - Stenochirus
      - Pseudastacus
    - Chilenophoberus
  - Palaeophoberus
  - Tillocheles
