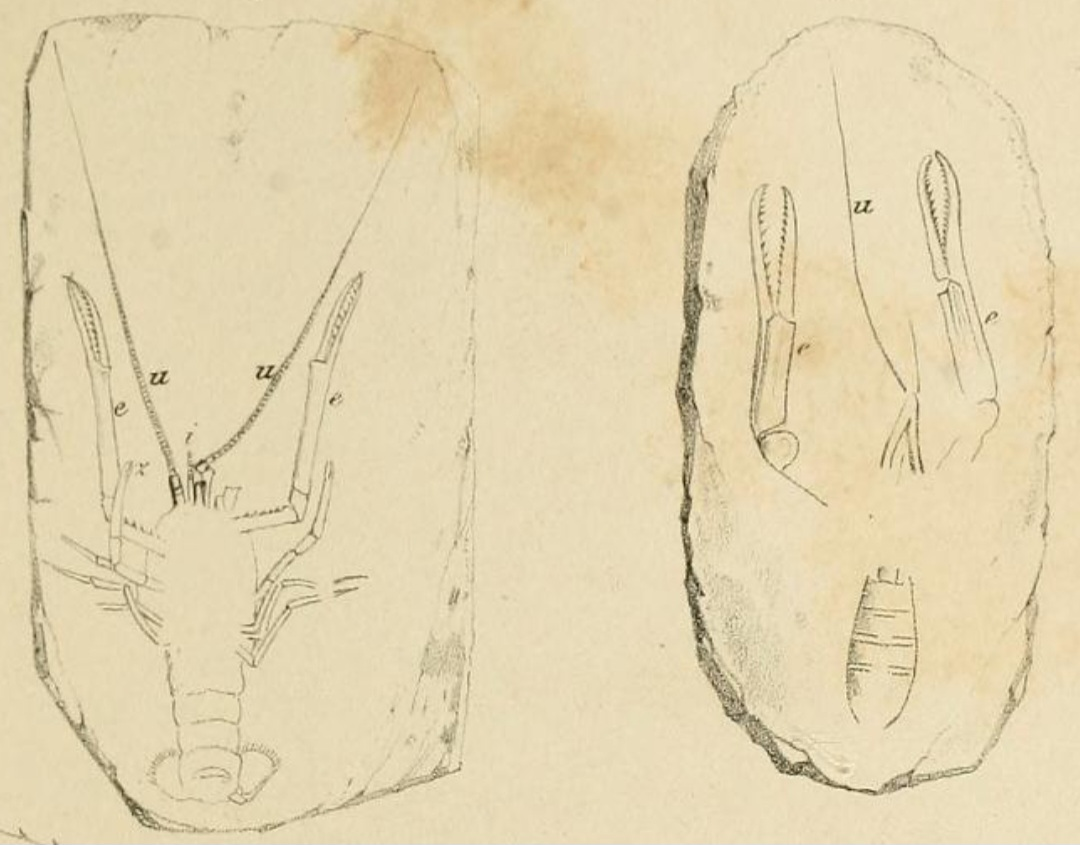
- Fossils of S. mayeri (left) and S. angustus (right)

Scientific classification
- Kingdom: Animalia
- Phylum: Arthropoda
- Clade: Pancrustacea
- Class: Malacostraca
- Order: Decapoda
- Suborder: Pleocyemata
- Family: †Stenochiridae
- Genus: †Stenochirus; Oppel, 1861

Type species
- †Bolina angusta Münster, 1839

Species
- †S. angustus Münster, 1839; †S. mayeri Oppel, 1862; †S. vahldieki Schweigert, Garassino & Riou, 2006

Synonyms
- S. angustus synonymy: Bolina angusta Münster, 1839

= Stenochirus =

Stenochirus Temporal range: Callovian-Tithonian

Extinct genus of crustaceans

Stenochirus is an extinct genus of decapod crustaceans that lived from the Callovian to Tithonian stages of the Jurassic period. Its fossils have been found in Germany and France.

== Discovery and naming ==
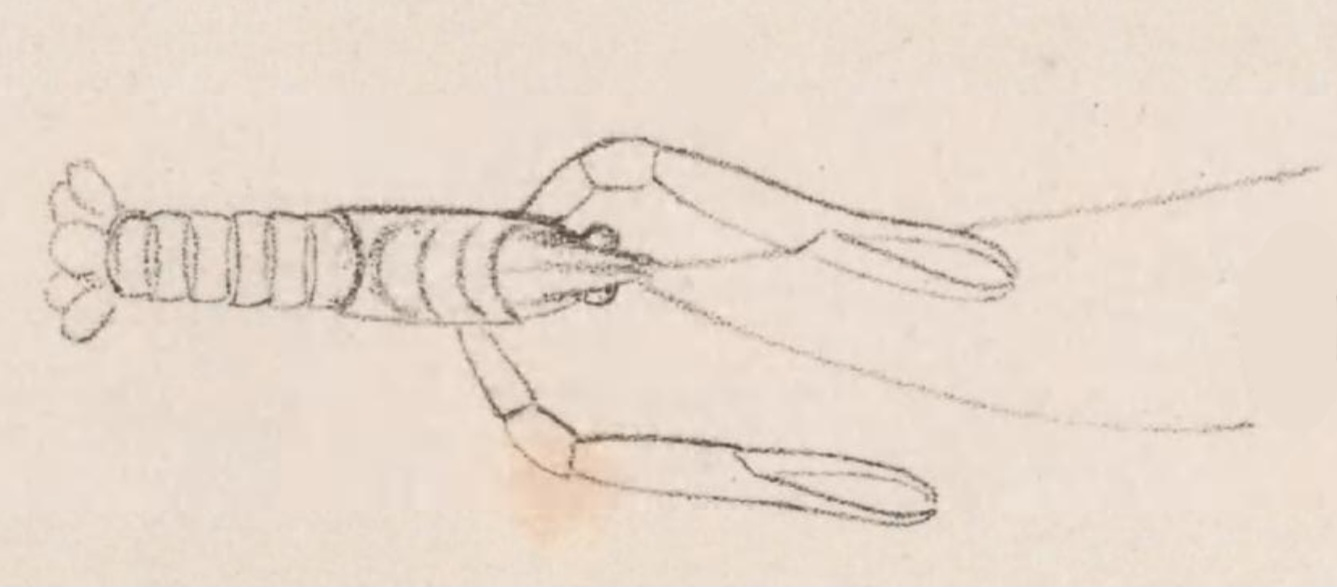
S. angustus as illustrated in Münster's 1839 paper, originally labelled as Bolina angusta

Remains of Stenochirus have been described before the genus was named. Georg zu Münster established the genus Bolina in 1839 and assigned to species to it, B. angusta and B. pustulosa (the type species), both originating from the Tithonian-aged Solnhofen Limestone in Bavaria. 22 years later in 1861, Albert Oppel points out that the genus name Bolina is preoccupied by a cnidarian, and reassigns the two species into separate genera. He erects the new genera Stenochirus and Pseudastacus, which B. angusta and B. pustulosa became the type species of respectively, the former now renamed as Stenochirus angustus.

In addition to the type species, two other species have been assigned to the genus. Oppel described a second species in 1862, which he named Stenochirus mayeri after Charles Mayer-Eymar, based on one specimen preserved showing its underside collected from the Solnhofen Limestone. The specific name has been misspelled as meyeri in some publications, due to mistakenly believing the species is named after Hermann v. Meyer. In 2006, the third species Stenochirus vahldieki was named from remains found in the lagerstätte at La Voulte-sur-Rhône, France. This site dates back to the Callovian stage of the Middle Jurassic period, making S. vahldieki the oldest known species of the genus.

== Description ==
Measuring around 3 cm (1.2 in) long, Stenochirus was a small crustacean with a crayfish-like build and smooth exoskeleton. The carapace is cylindrical, with a deep cervical groove stretching across the top and sides, as well as two shallow grooves behind it running parallel to each other. The back of the carapace has slightly convex margin. The rostrum is long and has four forward-pointing teeth on its sides. A pair of short stalks connect the compound eyes to the head. The antennae are very long, exceeding the rest of the body in length.

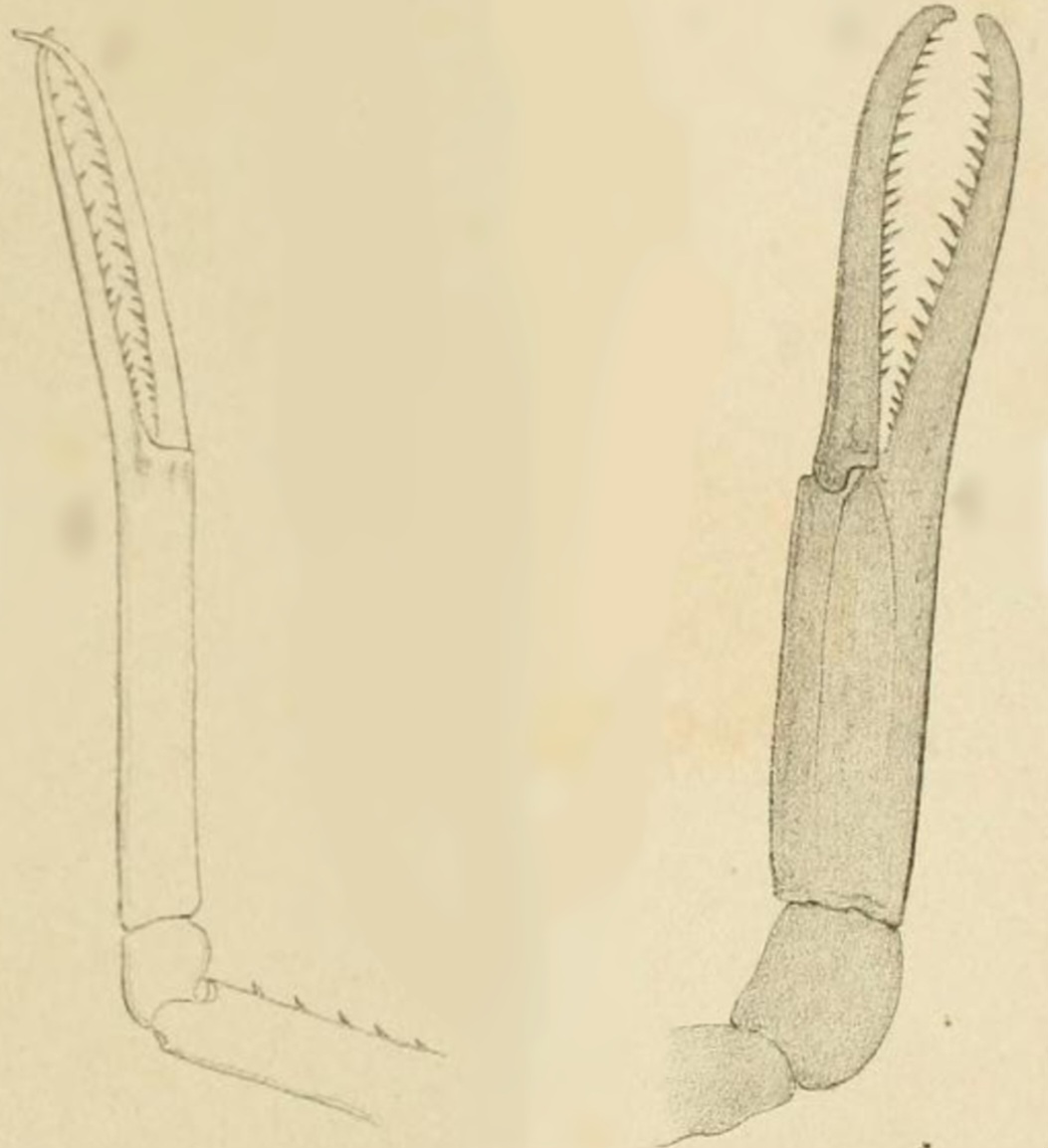
Comparison of the pincers of S. mayeri (left) and S. angustus (right)

The frontmost pair of pereiopods are very long and slender, ending with pincers. Both "fingers" of each pincer have rows of elongated teeth-like serrations and curve at the tip. In S. angustus, the frontmost pereiopods are six times as long as they are wide, and the pincer "fingers" are equal in length. Meanwhile, the frontmost pereiopods of S. mayeri are narrower, being 12 times longer than they are wide, and the movable pincer "finger" is longer than the fixed one. The first abdomen segment is smaller than the others, which are around the same length and subrectangular in shape. The telson also has a subrectangular shape, as well as a weak groove, two pairs of spines and two ridges starting at the front of the upper surface which end with small spines on the side margins. Both the endopods and exopods of the uropods have weak ridges, the latter additionally having a small spine on the outer margin.

== Classification ==
Stenochirus is the type genus of the family Stenochiridae, assigned as such when the family was established without formal diagnosis by Karl Beurlen in 1928. Beurlen initially erected it as a subfamily named Stenochirinae, but would elevate it to family level in 1930. Although Martin Glaessner assigned Stenochirus to Erymidae in 1929, he later placed it as an indeterminate astacidean when writing for the Treatise on Invertebrate Paleontology in 1969. Garassino & Schweigert (2006) would resurrect the taxon Stenochiridae and give the family a formal diagnosis, reassigning Stenochirus as its only genus.

In 2013, analysis by Karasawa et al. found that the supposed family Chilenophoberidae is paraphyletic, as Stenochirus is nested within as a sister taxon to Pseudastacus. They therefore declared Chilenophoberidae as a junior synonym of Stenochiridae, and thus more genera were moved into the family. The following cladogram shows the placement of Stenochirus within Stenochiridae according to the study:

- Stenochiridae
  - - - Stenochirus
      - Pseudastacus
    - Chilenophoberus
  - Palaeophoberus
  - Tillocheles
