= Palaeophoberus =

Palaeophoberus Temporal range: Aalenian-Tithonian

Scientific classification
- Domain: Eukaryota
- Kingdom: Animalia
- Phylum: Arthropoda
- Class: Malacostraca
- Order: Decapoda
- Suborder: Pleocyemata
- Family: †Stenochiridae
- Genus: †Palaeophoberus; Glaessner, 1932

Type species
- †Stenochirus suevicus Quenstedt, 1867

Species
- †P. suevicus Quenstedt, 1867; †P. portlandicus Roger & Lapparent, 1944

Synonyms
- P. suevicus synonymy: Stenochirus suevicus Quenstedt, 1867

Extinct genus of crustaceans

Palaeophoberus is an extinct genus of decapod crustaceans that lived from the Aalenian to Tithonian stages of the Jurassic period. Its fossils have been found in Germany and France.

== Taxonomic history ==
The first known fossils of Palaeophoberus were initially assigned to another genus; Friedrich August von Quenstedt named the species Stenochirus suevicus in 1867 based on remains collected from Aalenian-aged deposits in Reutlingen, Germany. 65 years later in 1932, Martin Glaessner determines that these remains differ significantly from the type specimen of Stenochirus and thus belong in a separate genus, which he named Palaeophoberus, with P. suevicus as its type and only species. The generic name means "ancient Phoberus", as Glaessner believed it was related to Acanthacaris (formerly known as Phoberus).

A second species was assigned to Palaeophoberus in 1944. Named P. portlandicus, its remains were collected from Tithonian-aged deposits in Hannaches, France. The specific name references the Portlandian stage, a term used in the past which corresponds to the Tithonian.

== Classification ==
In his establishment of the genus, Glaessner (1932) considered Palaeophoberus to be related to the extant Acanthacaris, placing both genera in the family Nephropidae. Later in 1969, Glaessner named the group containing Acanthacaris and Palaeophoberus as the subfamily Neophoberinae. The idea that these two genera were related persisted for decades, with several subsequent authors following this classification and even proposing Acanthacaris is a descendant of Palaeophoberus.

In 1997, phylogenetic analysis carried out by Tsudy & Babcock found that Acanthacaris was not actually related to Palaeophoberus, thus the latter genus was moved out of Neophoberinae and reassigned to the family Chilenophoberidae. Karasawa et al. (2013) later declared that Chilenophoberidae is a paraphyletic grouping, synonymizing it with Stenochiridae, and reassigning all chilenophoberid genera (including Palaeophoberus) as stenochirids. The following cladogram shows the placement of Palaeophoberus within Stenochiridae according to the study:

- Stenochiridae
  - - - Stenochirus
      - Pseudastacus
    - Chilenophoberus
  - Palaeophoberus
  - Tillocheles
