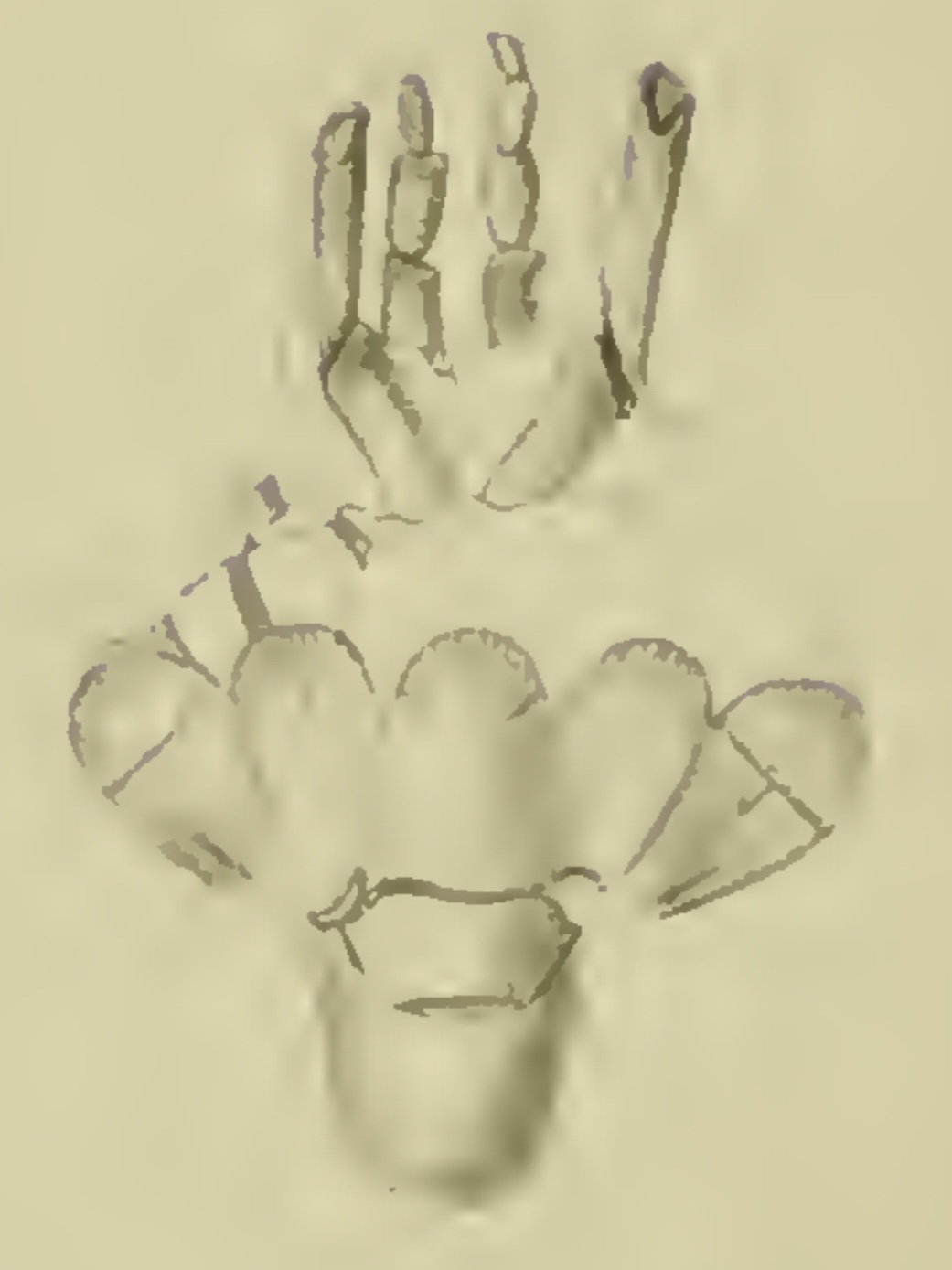
- Illustration of a P. politus fossil

Scientific classification
- Kingdom: Animalia
- Phylum: Arthropoda
- Clade: Pancrustacea
- Class: Malacostraca
- Order: Decapoda
- Suborder: Pleocyemata
- Infraorder: Astacidea
- Superfamily: †Protastacoidea; Albrecht, 1983
- Family: †Protastacidae; Albrecht, 1983
- Genus: †Protastacus; Albrecht, 1983

Type species
- †Astacus politus Schlüter, 1868

Species
- †P. antiquus Harbort, 1905; †P. politus Schlüter, 1868

Synonyms
- P. antiquus synonymy: Astacus antiquus Harbort, 1905; P. politus synonymy: Astacus politus Schlüter, 1868

= Protastacus =

Protastacus Temporal range: Berriasian-Hauterivian

Extinct genus of crustaceans

Protastacus is an extinct genus of decapod crustaceans that lived in what is now Germany during the early Cretaceous period. The type species is P. politus, and a second species, P. antiquus, is also assigned to the genus. Protastacus grew to around 10 cm (3.9 in) long and had a mostly crayfish-like appearance, with enlarged pincer-bearing appendages and a segmented abdomen. Though formerly assigned to the Astacidae or Nephropoidea, it is currently placed as the only genus in the family Protastacidae, which in turn is the only family in the superfamily Protastacoidea.

Both known species are believed to be brackish water animals, inhabiting a large upland-surrounded lake where the Bückeberg Formation was deposited during the earliest Cretaceous. This lake was originally freshwater and connected to the Boreal Sea, but became brackish due to marine transgression. Protastacus would have lived alongside various fish, invertebrates and aquatic reptiles in this lake, while terrestrial animals such as dinosaurs inhabited the surrounding shores.

== Discovery and naming ==
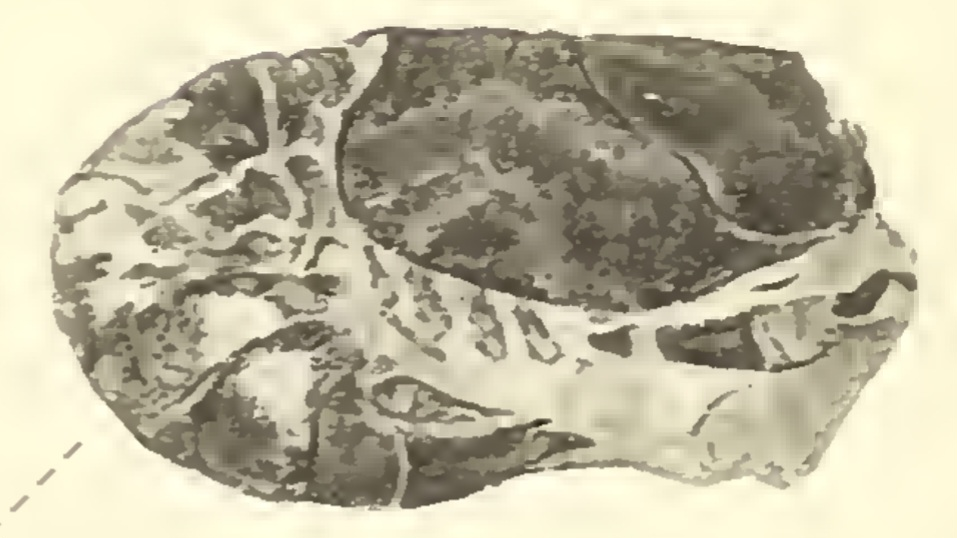
Fossil of P. antiquus as viewed from the side

Fossils of Protastacus have been described 115 years before the genus was established. In 1868, Schlüter erected the species Astacus politus based on remains found near Ochtrup, Germany, believing it represented an extinct species of the extant crayfish genus Astacus. Later in 1905, Erich Harbort studies fossilized remains in clay ironstone geodes found north of Bückeberg, Germany and erects the species Astacus antiquus based on them. Harbort notes the similarity between A. politus and A. antiquus, and that the two species differ in the shape of the carapace and uropods. The specific name antiquus is Latin meaning "ancient".

Albrecht (1983) is the first to recognize that the two aforementioned species do not actually belong to Astacus. He erects the genus Protastacus with A. politus as its type species and A. antiquus as an additional species. The two are thus renamed as Protastacus politus and Protastacus antiquus respectively.

== Description ==
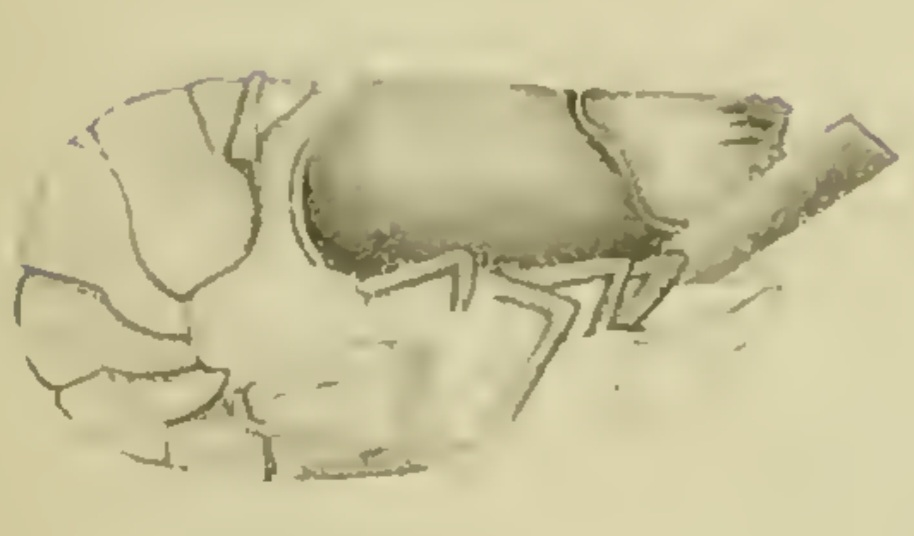
Illustration of a P. politus fossil viewed from the side

A crustacean of moderate size, Harbort (1905) noted that larger specimens of Protastacus are around 10 cm (3.9 in) long. The carapace is smooth and subcylindrical in shape, with a deep cervical groove stretching across its surface. This groove first bends down the carapace sides, then bends forwards, down and forwards again to reach the front of the carapace. There are no postcervical or branchiocardiac grooves. Two keel-like projections are present lower on the sides, as well as a thornlike structure at the front of either side at the "cheek" area. Though the ends of the antennae are not preserved, their bases were enlarged.

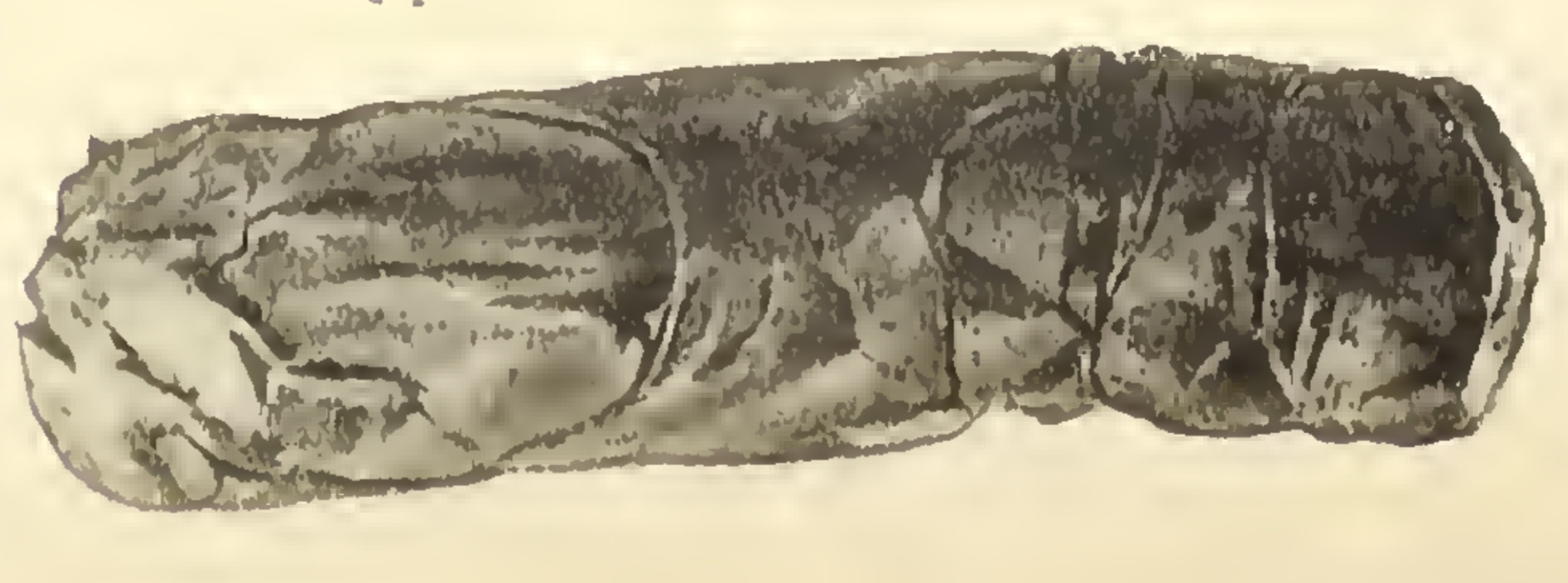
Top view of a P. antiquus fossil

The first three pair of pereiopods end with pincers, with the frontmost pair being most greatly enlarged. The first segment of the abdomen is small, whereas the second to sixth segments are larger and around the same size. The exoskeletal parts of these segments are laterally rounded and enlarged, giving the appearance that these segments are bulging at the bottom. Like the carapace, the covering of the abdomen is smooth. The telson has a subrectangular shape and the uropods are large, with the exopods being divided by a distinct suture known as the diaeresis.

== Classification ==
Although both Protastacus species were initially described as species of Astacus, Albrecht (1983) recognized that they form a distinct genus belonging in a separate family from Astacus. He named this family Protastacidae, assigning the two genera Protastacus and Pseudastacus into it, the former being the type genus of the family. In 1997, Tshudy and Babcock reassigned Pseudastacus to the family Chilenophoberidae, leaving Protastacidae as a monotypic family with Protastacus as its only genus.

The phylogenetic placement of Protastacidae has been a subject of controversy. Shen et al. (2001) and Schram (2001) questioned the family's placement in Astacida. In 2003, Rode and Babcock found that Protastacus belonged to the family Astacidae, making Protastacidae an invalid grouping. From 2009 to 2012, Protastacidae was commonly placed in the superfamily Nephropoidea as relatives to the lobster family Nephropidae. Analysis by Karasawa et al. (2013) found that Protastacidae contained only the genus Protastacus and belonged in a monotypic superfamily (Protastacoidea), which is a sister taxon to the clade containing Astacoidea and Parastacoidea. The following cladogram shows the placement of Protastacus within Astacidea according to the study:

- - Astacidea
    - - - Parastacidae
        - Astacoidea
          - - †Cricoidoscelosidae
            - Cambaridae
          - Astacidae
      - †Protastacidae
        †Protastacus
    - - Enoplometopoidea
        - Enoplometopidae
        - †Uncinidae
      - - †Stenochiridae
        - Nephropidae

== Paleoenvironment ==
Both of the known Protastacus species were collected from early Cretaceous deposits in Germany. Although Schlüter (1868) does not specify the horizon from which the fossils of P. politus were collected, Harbort (1905) states they most likely originate from the "upper Wealden", which is also where P. antiquus fossils were discovered. The "upper Wealden" here likely refers to the Bückeberg Formation, sometimes called the "German Wealden" due to its similarity to the British Wealden Group. Protastacus is believed to be a brackish water animal, as analysis of hydrogen, carbon and sulphur ratios as well as the presence of Botryococcus algae in the Bückeberg Formation prove the depositional environment was brackish-freshwater.

The Bückeberg Formation likely represented a large lake receiving fluvial drainage from the surrounding uplands and connected to the Boreal Sea to the west by narrow passage. Though originally freshwater, this lake gradually became brackish due to marine transgression caused by episodic transgressive phases and tectonic activity. Fossil remains of various aquatic animals have been found here which would have lived alongside Protastacus, such as molluscs, crustaceans, fish (hybodonts, Indaginilepis and Scheenstia), turtles (including Hylaeochelys, Pleurosternon and Dorsetochelys (=Ballerstedtia)), the plesiosaur Brancasaurus, and crocodyliforms (Goniopholis and Pholidosaurus). Terrestrial animals that would have lived on the lake shores are also represented, including body fossils of the dinosaurs Stenopelix and Hylaeosaurus, as well as footprints of various dinosaurs and pterosaurs.
