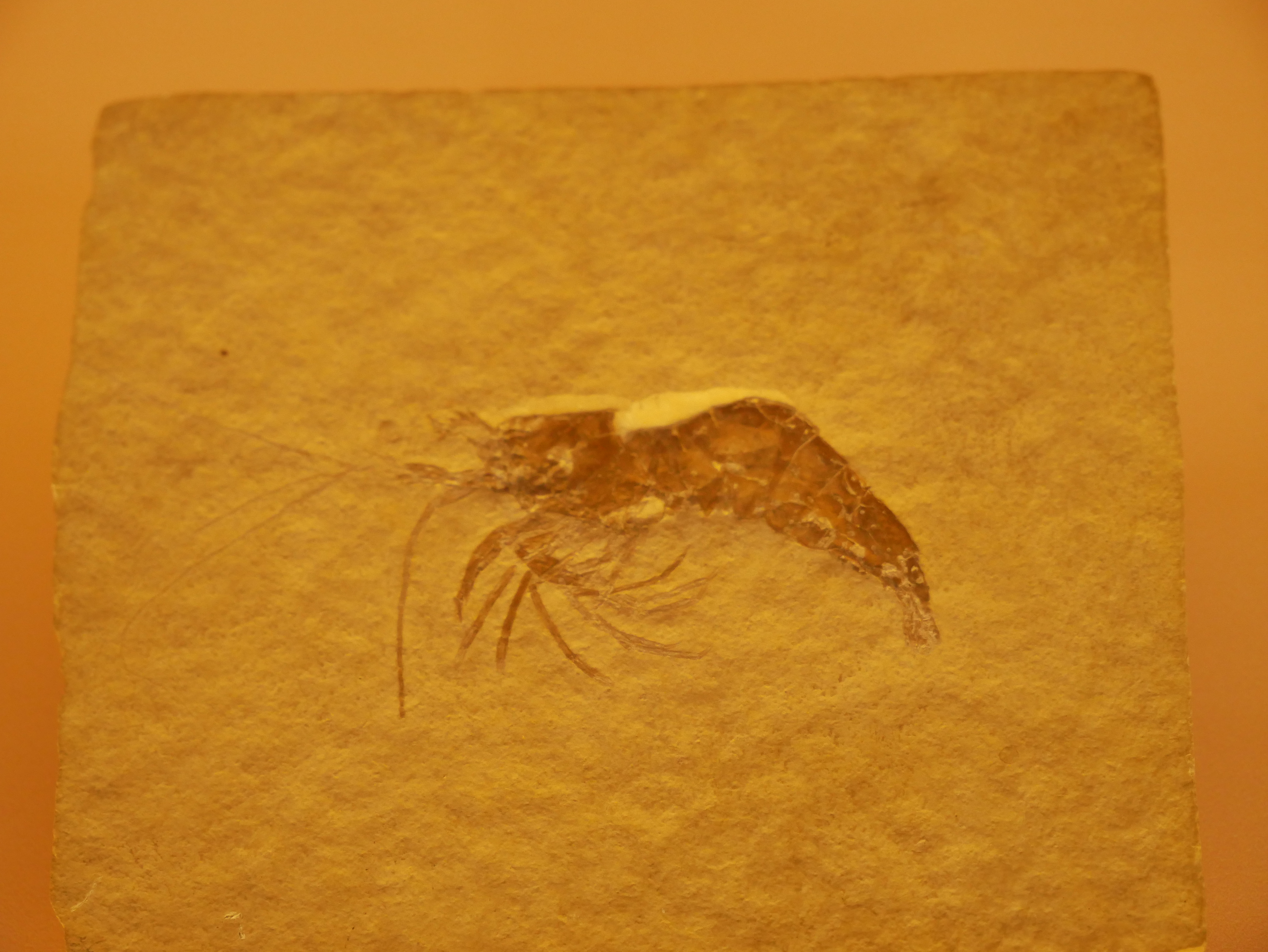
- Albertoppelia kuempeli fossil, Muséum National d'Histoire Naturelle.

Scientific classification
- Domain: Eukaryota
- Kingdom: Animalia
- Phylum: Arthropoda
- Class: Malacostraca
- Order: Decapoda
- Suborder: Dendrobranchiata
- Family: Penaeidae
- Genus: Albertoppelia
- Species: A. kuempeli

Binomial name
- Albertoppelia kuempeli Schweigert & Garassino, 2003

= Albertoppelia =

Albertoppelia Temporal range: Upper Jurassic

Extinct genus of crustaceans

Albertoppelia is an extinct genus of prawn which existed during the Late Jurassic period, named after Albert Oppel. It contains the single species Abertoppelia kuempeli. Fossils of Albertoppelia were recovered from the Eichstätt Formation (Solnhofen Group) in Bavaria, Germany.
