= Tillocheles =

Tillocheles Temporal range: Albian-Turonian

Scientific classification
- Kingdom: Animalia
- Phylum: Arthropoda
- Class: Malacostraca
- Order: Decapoda
- Suborder: Pleocyemata
- Family: †Stenochiridae
- Genus: †Tillocheles; Woods, 1957

Type species
- †Tillocheles shannonae Woods, 1957

Other species
- †T. kaoriae Yokoi & Karasawa, 2000

Extinct genus of crustaceans

Tillocheles is an extinct genus of decapod crustaceans that lived during the Cretaceous period. Two species are currently placed in the genus. Fossils of the earlier type species, T. shannonae, have been found in Queensland, while remains of the later species, T. kaoriae, are known from Hokkaido.

== Discovery and naming ==
Fossils of Tillocheles were first described in 1957, when eight specimens were collected from the late Albian-aged Tambo Formation in Currane, central Queensland, Australia. Based on these specimens, Jack T. Woods erected the genus Tillocheles, with T. shannonae as its type and only species. A specimen preserving part of the carapace, abdomen and appendages (F. 3252) was designated as the holotype of this species. The specific name honors Sanna Shannon, who discovered and collected fossils of decapod crustaceans at Currane.

In addition to the type species, a second species was assigned to Tillocheles in 2000. Named T. kaoriae (after Kaori Yokoi), it was described based on two specimens collected from the middle Yezo Group of Hokkaido, Japan. The holotype (MFM247017) was collected from Turonian-aged deposits at Obira-chō, while the paratype was found in the Cenomanian-aged Mikasa Formation at Mikasa.

== Description ==
Tillocheles was a small invertebrate, with the carapace of T. shannonae measuring around 39 mm (1.5 in) long and making up about three-eighths of the total body length. Small tubercles and pits are distributed across the surface of the carapace, which is subcylindrical in shape. The rostrum is long and has two small, forward-pointing lateral spines. A deep cervical groove stretches across the top and sides of the carapace, and a pair of shallower branchiocardiac grooves run parallel to the dorsal midline. Several keels are present on the upper surface of the carapace.

The first pair of pereiopods is elongated and large (with prodopi slightly longer than the carapace), and ending with pincers. In T. shannonae the meri of this pair of pereiopods has tubercles, whereas in T. kaoriae they have forward-pointing spines. Both species are heterochelate, having left and right chelipeds (pincer-bearing appendages) with different form. The left cheliped has a thicker carpus, a large compressed tooth on the pollex ("thumb" of the pincer), and a dactylus with a scalloped cutting edge. The right cheliped has an additional rows of tubercles on the prodopus, a heavy rounded tooth on the pollex and a dactylus with two rounded teeth on the cutting edge.

The abdomen is strongly convex and large, with keels running down its length in the middle. Fine ridges surround areas with small pits on the second to sixth segments. The first segment has the smallest tergite. The telson is flattened laterally, with backward-pointing spines on the side margins and a rounded back margin.

== Classification ==
In his initial description of the genus, James T. Woods assigned Tillocheles to the family Nephropidae. However, phylogenetic analysis done by Tshudy and Babcock (1997) found that this genus (along with several other genera then placed in Nephropidae) actually belongs in a separate family which they named Chilenophoberidae.

Further study by Karasawa et al. (2013) found that Chilenophoberidae is a paraphyletic grouping, and the family was declared a junior synonym of Stenochiridae. All chilenophoberidae genera were thus reclassified as stenochirids, including Tillocheles. The following cladogram shows the placement of Tillocheles within Stenochiridae according to the study:

- Stenochiridae
  - - - Stenochirus
      - Pseudastacus
    - Chilenophoberus
  - Palaeophoberus
  - Tillocheles
