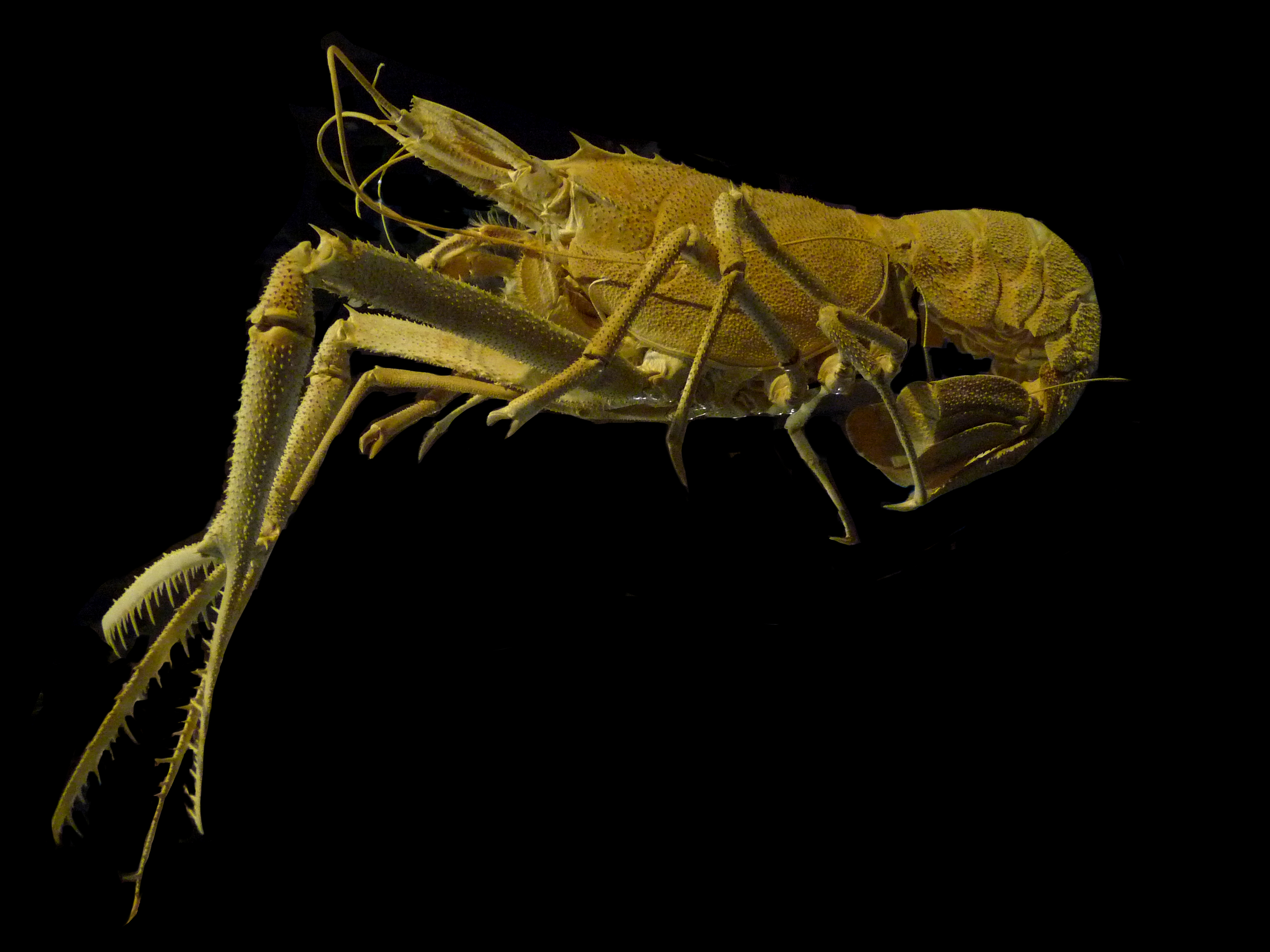

Scientific classification
- Kingdom: Animalia
- Phylum: Arthropoda
- Clade: Pancrustacea
- Class: Malacostraca
- Order: Decapoda
- Suborder: Pleocyemata
- Family: Nephropidae
- Genus: Acanthacaris
- Species: A. tenuimana

Binomial name
- Acanthacaris tenuimana Bate, 1888

= Acanthacaris tenuimana =

Species of deep-water lobster

Acanthacaris tenuimana is a species of deep-water lobster.

== See also ==
- Acanthacaris caeca, the only other species in Acanthacaris
