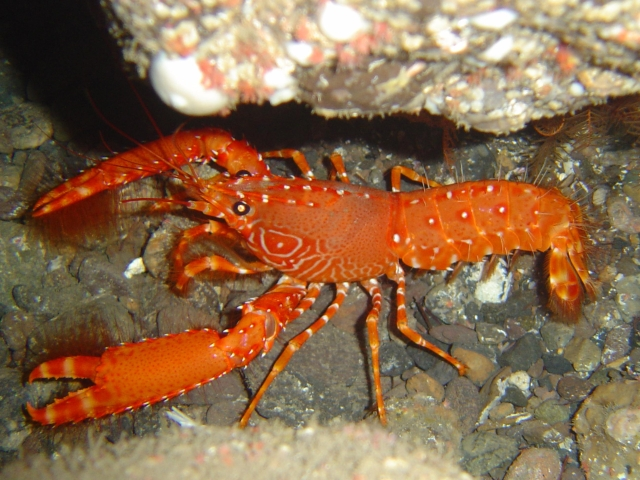

Conservation status
- Least Concern (IUCN 3.1)

- Apparently Secure (NatureServe)

Scientific classification
- Kingdom: Animalia
- Phylum: Arthropoda
- Class: Malacostraca
- Order: Decapoda
- Suborder: Pleocyemata
- Family: Enoplometopidae
- Genus: Enoplometopus
- Species: E. antillensis

Binomial name
- Enoplometopus antillensis Lütken, 1865

Synonyms
- Enoplometopus dentatus Miers, 1880; Hoplometopus antillensis (Lütken, 1865)

= Enoplometopus antillensis =

Species of lobster from the Western Atlantic

Enoplometopus antillensis (commonly dwarf reef lobster, Atlantic reef lobster or flaming reef lobster) is a species of reef lobster endemic to warmer parts of the Atlantic Ocean. It is found at depths of 5–201 m (16–659 ft) in rocky and coral reefs, where it hides in small crevices. Dwarf reef lobsters are prized in the home aquarium hobby for their bright colors and small size.
