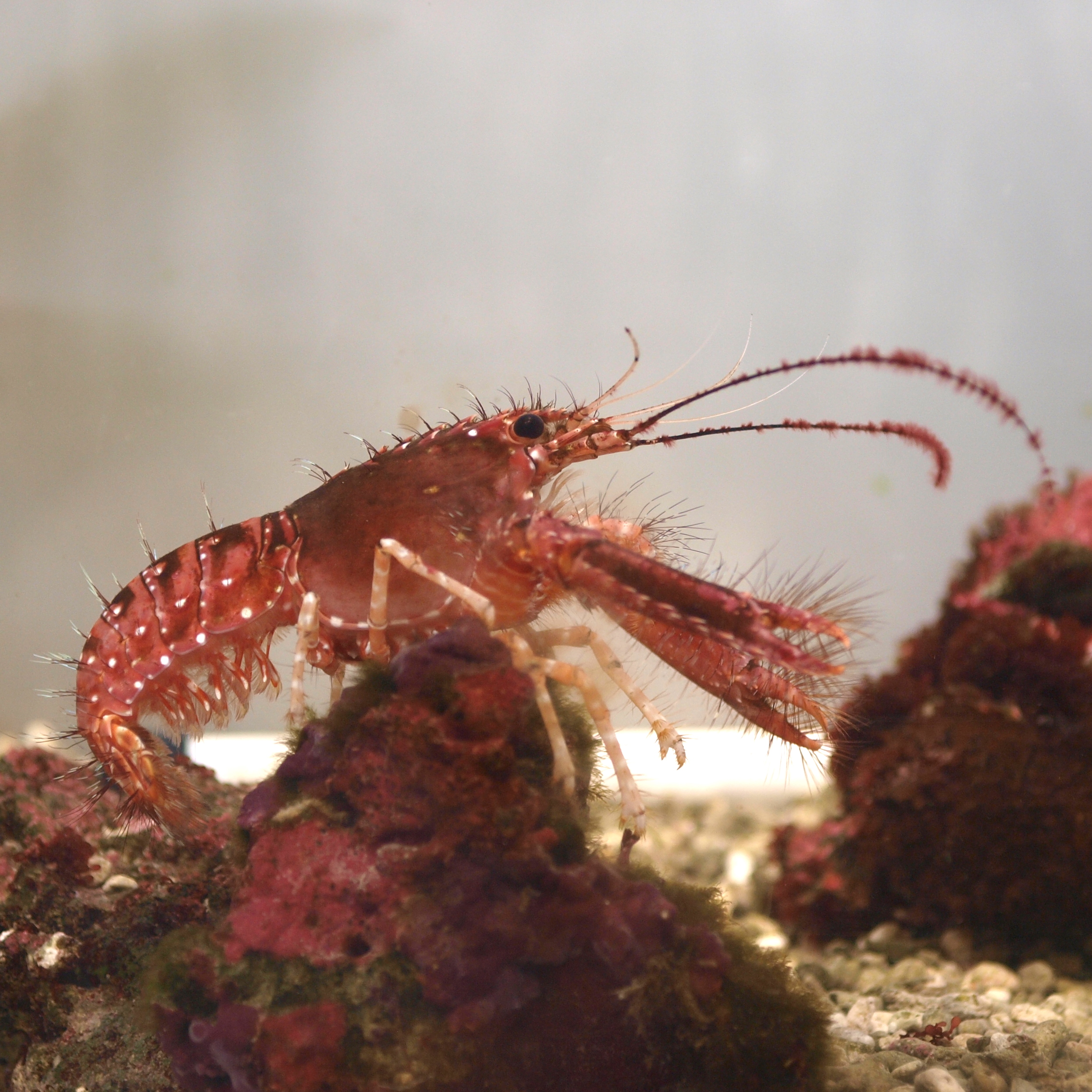

Conservation status
- Least Concern (IUCN 3.1)

Scientific classification
- Kingdom: Animalia
- Phylum: Arthropoda
- Class: Malacostraca
- Order: Decapoda
- Suborder: Pleocyemata
- Family: Enoplometopidae
- Genus: Enoplometopus
- Species: E. occidentalis

Binomial name
- Enoplometopus occidentalis (Randall, 1840)

= Enoplometopus occidentalis =

Species of crustacean

Enoplometopus occidentalis, the red reef lobster, Hawaiian reef lobster, or hairy reef lobster, is a reef lobster, native to the Indo-Pacific Ocean. It is in the family Enoplometopidae. The species was first discovered by zoologist John Witt Randall, who originally classified it as Nephrops occidentalis.

== Description ==
Enoplometopus occidentalis is easily identifiable due to its striking neon red or orange body, accompanied with distinctive white marking, and yellow hair-like structures. Its first pair of legs has slender, elongated claws and adult males can grow up to 14 cm (5.5 in) in length. The smooth, rounded abdominal leads to a rounded tail with a central spine and three movable side spines. In males, the first swimming limb looks leaf-like, while in females, it appears thread-like; the first pair of these limbs are modified for reproduction.

== Distribution ==
The red reef lobster is commonly found in the tropical waters of the Indo-West Pacific, including regions such as the eastern coast of Africa, Indonesia, Hawaii, the Philippines, and more recently, the Indian Ocean. Its distribution has expanded due to its popularity in the aquarium trade, where it is prized for its striking colors, contributing to its presence in many regions.

== Habitat ==
The red reef lobster is shy and often hides in crevices and resides in shallow tropical waters, often at depths ranging from 10 to 100 ft (3 to 30 m). It favors complex habitats such as coral reefs and rocks, where it provide crevices for hiding spots. These habitat offer protection from predators and supports the species diet to forage for food, including small fish and invertebrates.
