= Enoplometopus holthuisi =

Scientific classification
- Kingdom: Animalia
- Phylum: Arthropoda
- Class: Malacostraca
- Order: Decapoda
- Suborder: Pleocyemata
- Family: Enoplometopidae
- Genus: Enoplometopus
- Species: E. holthuisi

Binomial name
- Enoplometopus holthuisi Gordon, 1968

Species of crustacean

Enoplometopus holthuisi, also known as the bullseye reef lobster or Holthuis's reef lobster, is a reef lobster in the family Enoplometopidae.
