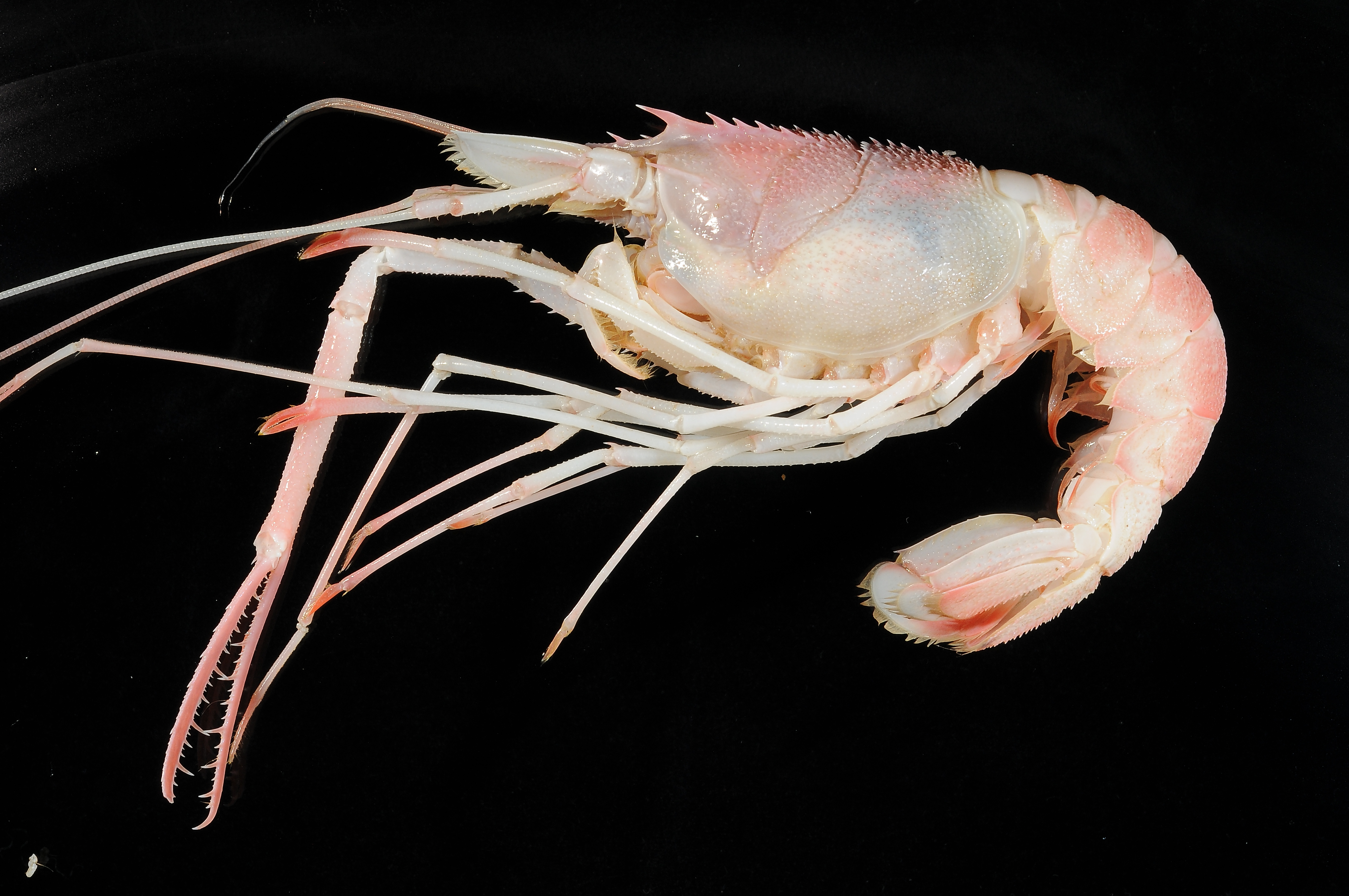

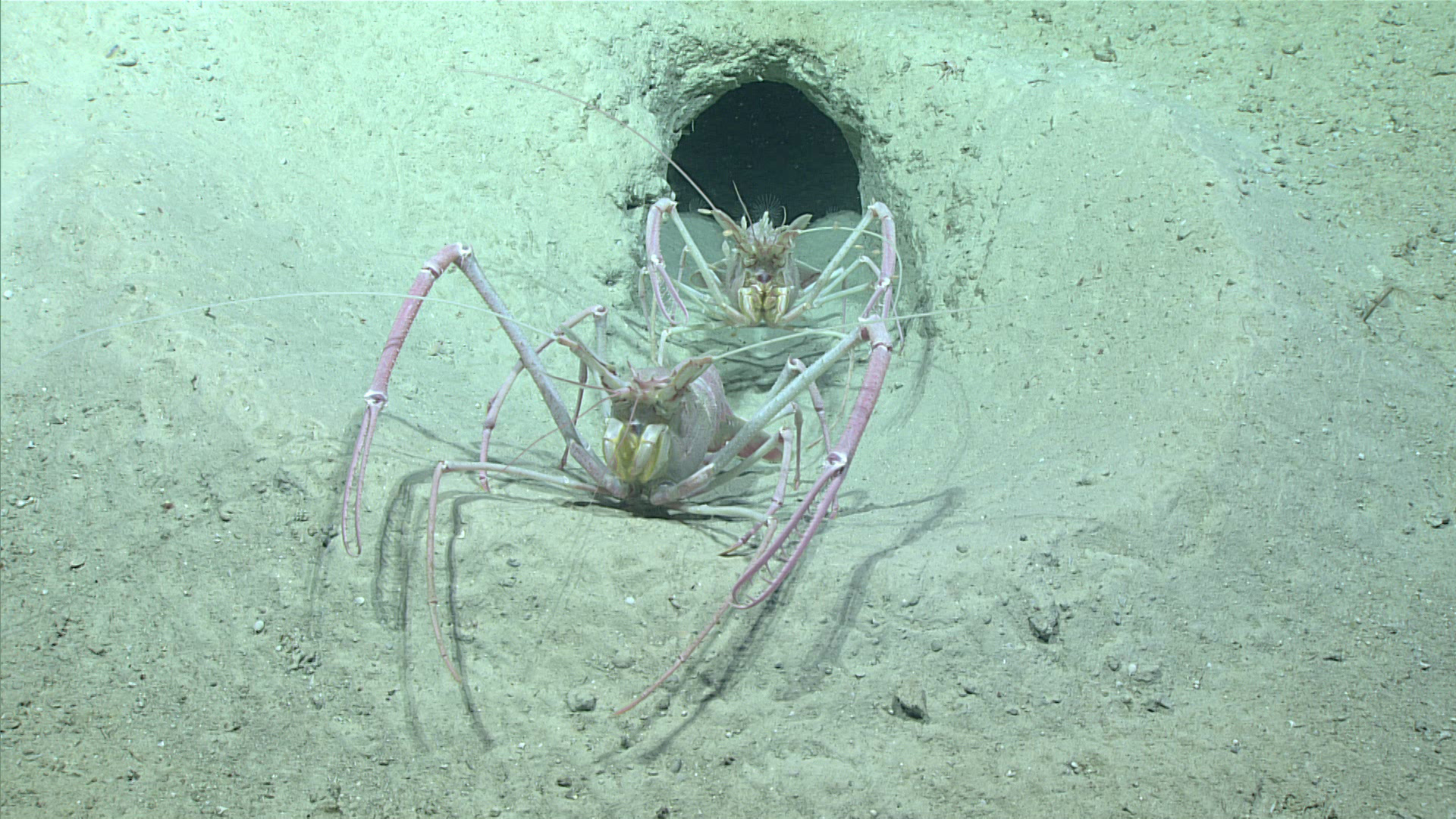

Scientific classification
- Kingdom: Animalia
- Phylum: Arthropoda
- Class: Malacostraca
- Order: Decapoda
- Suborder: Pleocyemata
- Family: Nephropidae
- Genus: Acanthacaris
- Species: A. caeca

Binomial name
- Acanthacaris caeca A. Milne-Edwards, 1881

= Acanthacaris caeca =

Species of deep-water lobster

Acanthacaris caeca is a species of deep-water lobster. It was originally described under the name Phoberus caecus by Alphonse Milne-Edwards. Lacking eyes, A. caeca is blind.

== Habitat ==
Acanthacaris caeca are found in the Caribbean Sea and in the Gulf of Mexico. They are generally found in burrows between 550 and 825 m (1,800 and 2,710 ft), but they can be found as deep as 880 m (2,890 ft) and as shallow as 290 m (950 ft). They burrow exclusively in muddy environments, and the burrows are 10 to 20 cm (4 to 8 in) deep.

== See also ==
- Acanthacaris tenuimana, the only other species in Acanthacaris
