= Caeca =

Caeca may refer to:

- the plural of caecum (see pyloric caeca in humans)
- Caeca et Obdurata, a papal bull promulgated by Pope Clement VIII in 1593, which expelled the Jews from the Papal States
