= Chauffour-sur-Vell =

- Commune
- Coat of arms
- Location of Chauffour-sur-Vell
- Location within France Location within Nouvelle-Aquitaine
- Coordinates: 45°01′11″N 1°39′56″E
- Country: France
- Region: Nouvelle-Aquitaine
- Department: Corrèze
- Arrondissement: Brive-la-Gaillarde
- Canton: Midi Corrézien
- Intercommunality: Midi Corrézien

Government
  - Mayor (2020–2026): Vincent Ledoux
- Area^{1}: 7.19 km^{2} (2.78 sq mi)
- Elevation: 127 m (417 ft)
- Highest elevation: 190 m (620 ft)
- Lowest elevation: 127 m (417 ft)
- Population (2023): 408
  - Density: 56.7/km^{2} (147/sq mi)
- Time zone: UTC+01:00 (CET)
  - Summer (DST): UTC+02:00 (CEST)
- INSEE/Postal code: 19050 /19500
- ^{1} French Land Register data, which excludes lakes, ponds, glaciers > 1 km^{2} (0.386 sq mi or 247 acres) and river estuaries.

Chauffour-sur-Vell is a commune in the Corrèze department in central France.

== Population ==
Historical population
Year	Pop.	±% p.a.
1968	287	—
1975	297	+0.49%
1982	289	−0.39%
1990	325	+1.48%
1999	320	−0.17%
2007	368	+1.76%
2012	410	+2.19%
2017	419	+0.44%
2023	408	−0.44%
Source: INSEE

== See also ==
- Communes of the Corrèze department
