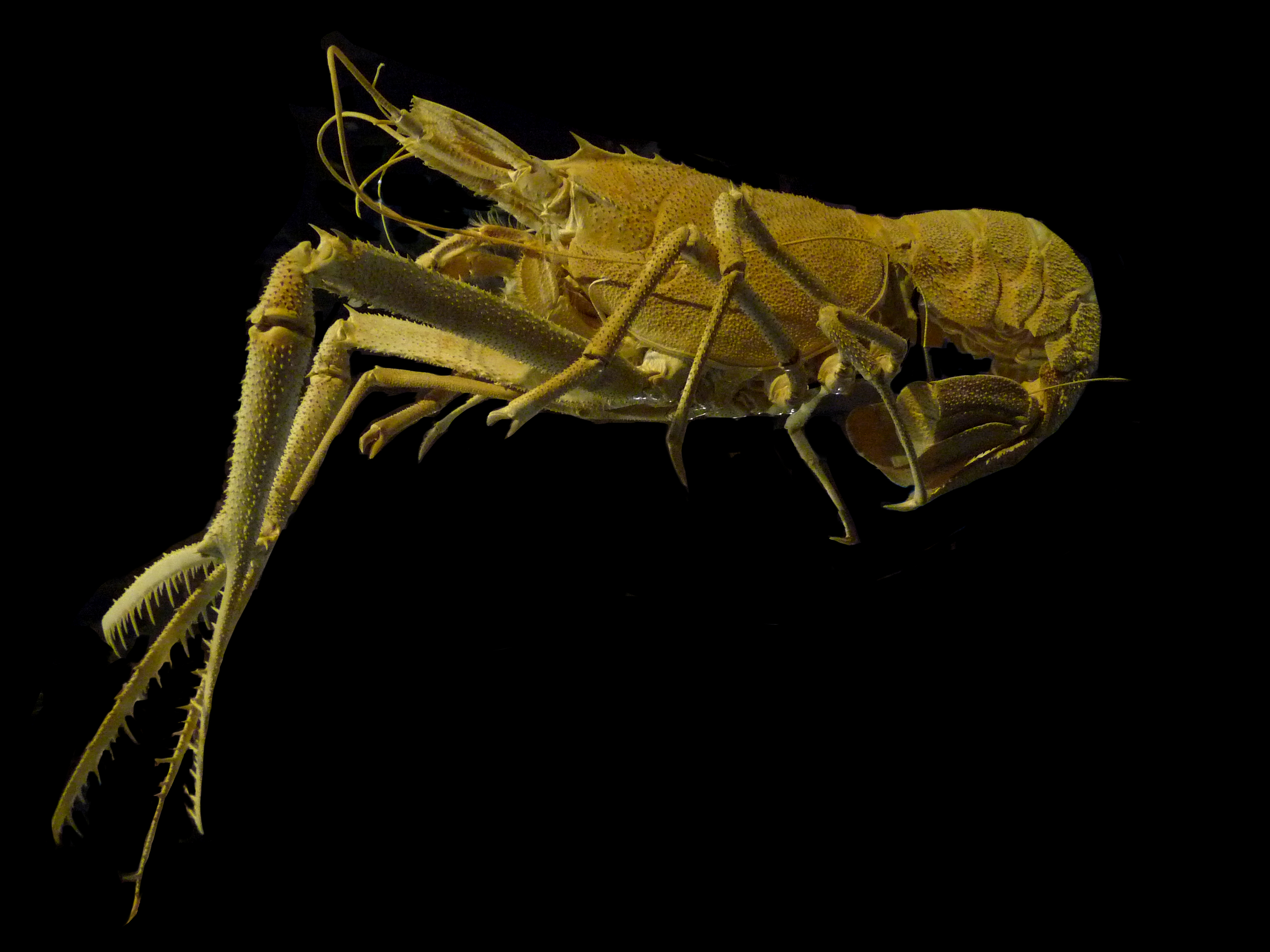
- Acanthacaris tenuimana

Scientific classification
- Kingdom: Animalia
- Phylum: Arthropoda
- Class: Malacostraca
- Order: Decapoda
- Suborder: Pleocyemata
- Superfamily: Nephropoidea
- Family: Nephropidae
- Subfamily: Neophoberinae; Glaessner, 1969
- Genus: Acanthacaris; Bate, 1888

Type species
- Acanthacaris tenuimana Spence Bate, 1888

Species
- Acanthacaris caeca A. Milne-Edwards, 1881; Acanthacaris tenuimana Spence Bate, 1888

Synonyms
- Phoberus A. Milne-Edwards, 1881; Neophoberus Glaessner, 1969

= Acanthacaris =

Genus of lobsters

Acanthacaris is a genus of deep-water lobsters. It contains two species, A. caeca and A. tenuimana, and is the only genus in the subfamily Neophoberinae.

== Description ==
They are relatively large lobsters with a cylindrical body covered with sharp spines (hence the genus name, meaning "spiny shrimp"). The carapace has a well-developed rostrum. The eyes are very small and lack pigment, while the antennae are long and whiplike. The telson and uropods are powerful. The first three pairs of walking legs end in claws. The first pair of claws is symmetrical and ends in long fingers covered with sharp spines on cutting edges but without hairs. The second pair of walking legs is much longer than the third pair. Both species reach a length of 40 centimetres (16 in). Acanthacaris has a laterally compressed rostrum, a unique arrangement of postcervical and cellar grooves, a large and elongate scaphocerite, and delicate, elongate claws with cylindrical palms. The acanthacaris have no gatrolateral or postcervical spine.

== Taxonomy ==
The genus Acanthacaris is the only genus in the subfamily Neophoberinae and contains two species:

- Acanthacaris caeca is found in the Caribbean Sea and the Gulf of Mexico, in burrows at a depth of 290–870 m (950–2,850 ft).
- Acanthacaris tenuimana, the type species, is found in the Indian and Pacific Oceans on muddy bottoms at a depth of 600–1,670 m (1,970–5,480 ft).

The genus was originally described as "Phoberus" by Alphonse Milne-Edwards in 1881, with "Phoberus caecus" (A. caeca) as the type species; this transpired to be a junior homonym of Phoberus erected by William Sharp Macleay in 1819 (a subgenus of the beetle genus Trox). Although the replacement name (nomen novum) "Neophoberus" was provided by Martin Glaessner in 1969, this is pre-dated by Charles Spence Bate's 1888 name Acanthacaris, which has A. tenuimana as the type species.
