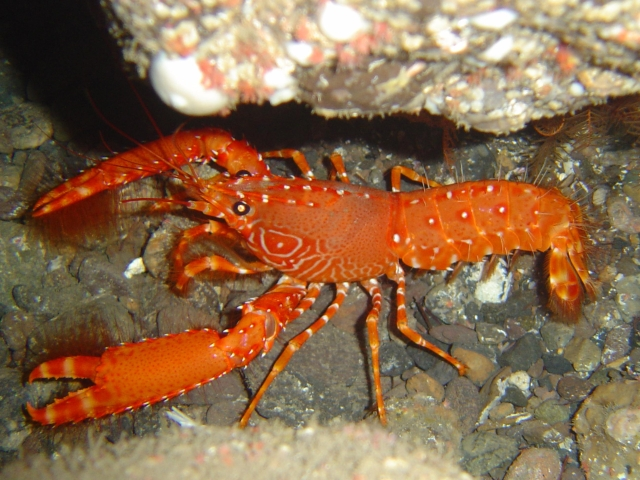
- Enoplometopus antillensis

Scientific classification
- Kingdom: Animalia
- Phylum: Arthropoda
- Class: Malacostraca
- Order: Decapoda
- Suborder: Pleocyemata
- Infraorder: Astacidea
- Superfamily: Enoplometopoidea; De Saint Laurent, 1988
- Family: Enoplometopidae; De Saint Laurent, 1988
- Genus: Enoplometopus; A. Milne Edwards, 1862

Type species
- Enoplometopus pictus A. Milne Edwards, 1862

Synonyms
- Hoplometopus Holthuis, 1983

= Reef lobster =

Reef lobsters Temporal range: 279–0 Ma Middle Permian - present

Genus of crustaceans

Reef lobsters, Enoplometopus, are a genus of small lobsters that live on reefs in the Indo-Pacific, Caribbean and warmer parts of the Atlantic Ocean.

== Description ==
Species of Enoplometopus occur from coral reefs at depths of less than 1 metre (3 ft 3 in) to rocky reefs at depths of 300 m (980 ft). They are brightly coloured, with stripes, rings, or spots. They are typically mainly red, orange, purplish and white. Reef lobsters are small (depending on species, up to 10–13 centimetres or 4–5 inches), nocturnal (spending the day in caves or crevices), and very timid. The species can be distinguished by their colouration and morphology.

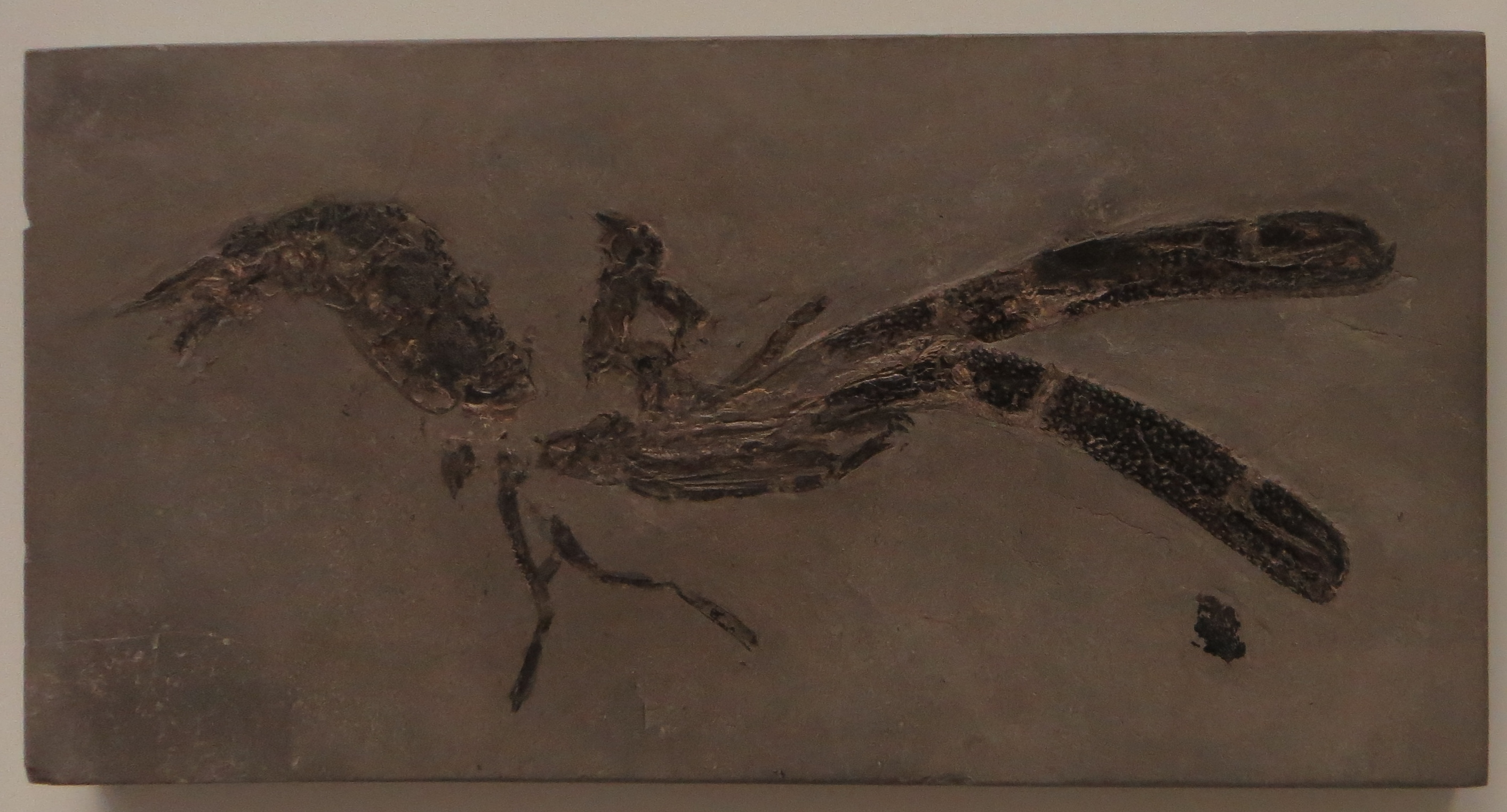
Fossil Uncina posidoniae

As a result of their bright colours, they are popular in the aquarium trade, and unregulated collection combined with destruction of coral reefs may threaten some species. Due to uncertainty over the impact of these potential threats, the majority are considered data deficient by the International Union for Conservation of Nature.

Reef lobsters are distinguished from clawed lobsters (family Nephropidae) by having full chelae (claws) only on the first pair of pereiopods, the second and third pairs being only subchelate (where the last segment of the appendage can press against a short projection from the penultimate one). Clawed lobsters have full claws on the first three pereiopods. Males, unlike those of nephropoid lobsters, have an extra lobe on the second pleopod, which is assumed to have some function in reproduction. Reef lobsters have a shallow cervical groove while clawed lobsters have a deep cervical groove.

Although there is no fossil record of reef lobsters, there is some evidence that they may be related to the extinct genus Eryma which lived from the Permo-Triassic to the late Cretaceous. It was later found to be a sister taxon of the Jurassic Lobster Uncina posidoniae, with the clade Enoplometopoidea including both enoplometopid and enigmatic uncinid lobsters.

== Species ==
The genus contains the following species:

- Enoplometopus antillensis Lütken, 1865
- Enoplometopus callistus Intès and Le Loeuff, 1970
- Enoplometopus chacei Kensley and Child, 1986
- Enoplometopus crosnieri Chan and Yu, 1998
- Enoplometopus daumi Holthuis, 1983
- Enoplometopus debelius Holthuis, 1983
- Enoplometopus gracilipes (De Saint Laurent, 1988)
- Enoplometopus holthuisi Gordon, 1968
- Enoplometopus occidentalis (Randall, 1840)
- Enoplometopus pictus A. Milne Edwards, 1862
- Enoplometopus voigtmanni Türkay, 1989
