= Albert Oppel =

German paleontologist

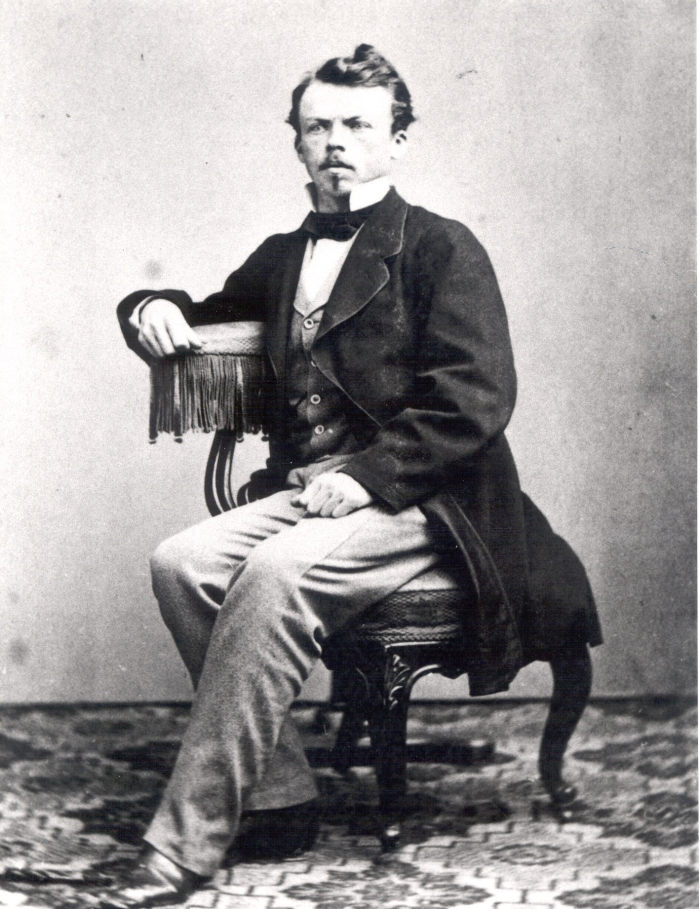
Carl Albert Oppel, 1862

Carl Albert Oppel (19 December 1831 – 23 December 1865) was a German paleontologist.

== History ==
He was born at Hohenheim in Württemberg, on 19 December 1831. He first went to the University of Tübingen, where he graduated with a Ph.D. in 1853. The results of his work was published in Die Juraformation Englands, Frankreichs und des südwestlichen Deutschlands (1856–1858). He went to the Palaeontological Museum at Munich in 1858 and became an assistant there. It was in 1860 that he became the Professor of Paleontology at the Ludwig-Maximilians-Universität München. Then, a year later, he became the director of the Palaeontological Collection. Of his later works, it can be said that the most important was Paläontologische Mittheilungen aus dem Museum des Königlichen Bayerischen Staates (1862–1865). He died on 23 December 1865 at the age of 34. The wrinkle ridge Dorsum Oppel on the Moon is named after him, as is the fossil prawn genus Albertoppelia.

== Studies ==
Oppel devoted his life to the study of fossils and the examination of the strata of the Jurassic period deposits. He is considered to have founded the study of zone stratigraphy and the use of index fossils, a term which he created, to compare the different strata. He also established the Tithonian stage, for strata (mainly equivalent to the English Portland and Purbeck Beds) that occur on the borders of Jurassic and Cretaceous. He was awarded the Chair of Paleontology at the Ludwig-Maximilians-Universität München.

== See also ==
- List of geologists
- Paleontology
