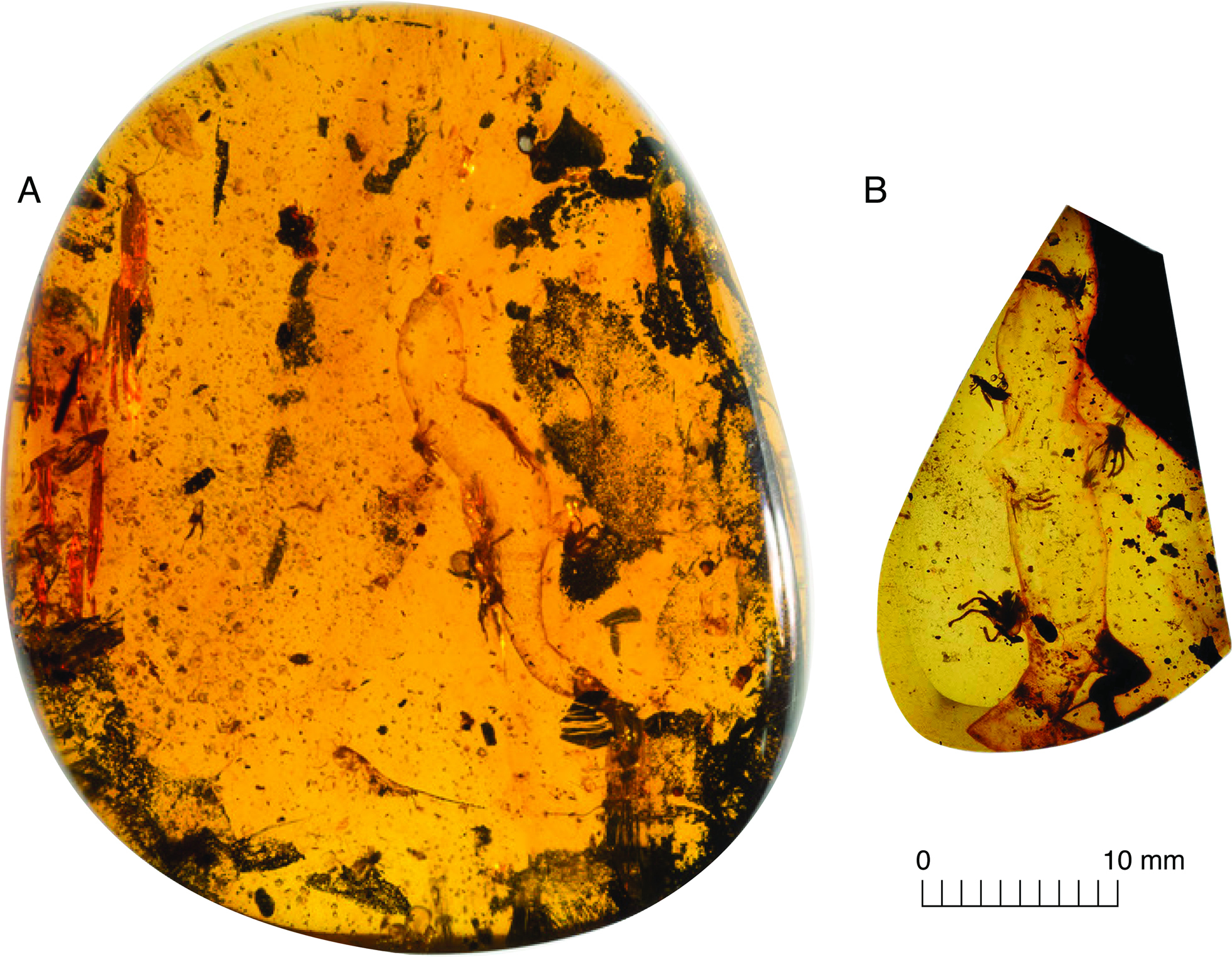
- Holotype (left) and paratype (right) specimens

Scientific classification
- Kingdom: Animalia
- Phylum: Chordata
- Order: Squamata
- Clade: Gekkonomorpha (?)
- Genus: †Carinasquama; Daza et al., 2026
- Species: †C. rusmithii

Binomial name
- †Carinasquama rusmithii Daza et al., 2026

= Carinasquama =

Carinasquama Temporal range: mid-Cretaceous

Genus of extinct lizard

Carinasquama (lit. 'keeled scale') is an extinct genus of possible pan-gekkotan lizard known from the mid-Cretaceous (~99 million years ago) of Myanmar. The genus contains a single species, Carinasquama rusmithii, known from two specimens preserved in amber from Myanmar. Both include limb bones and a transparent integumentary outline of the full body. A swelling at the base of the underside of the tail on one of these may indicate it is a male individual. With a snout–vent length of around 2 cm (0.79 in), Carinaquama is a tiny lizard, comparable in size to the smallest living geckos.

== Discovery and naming ==
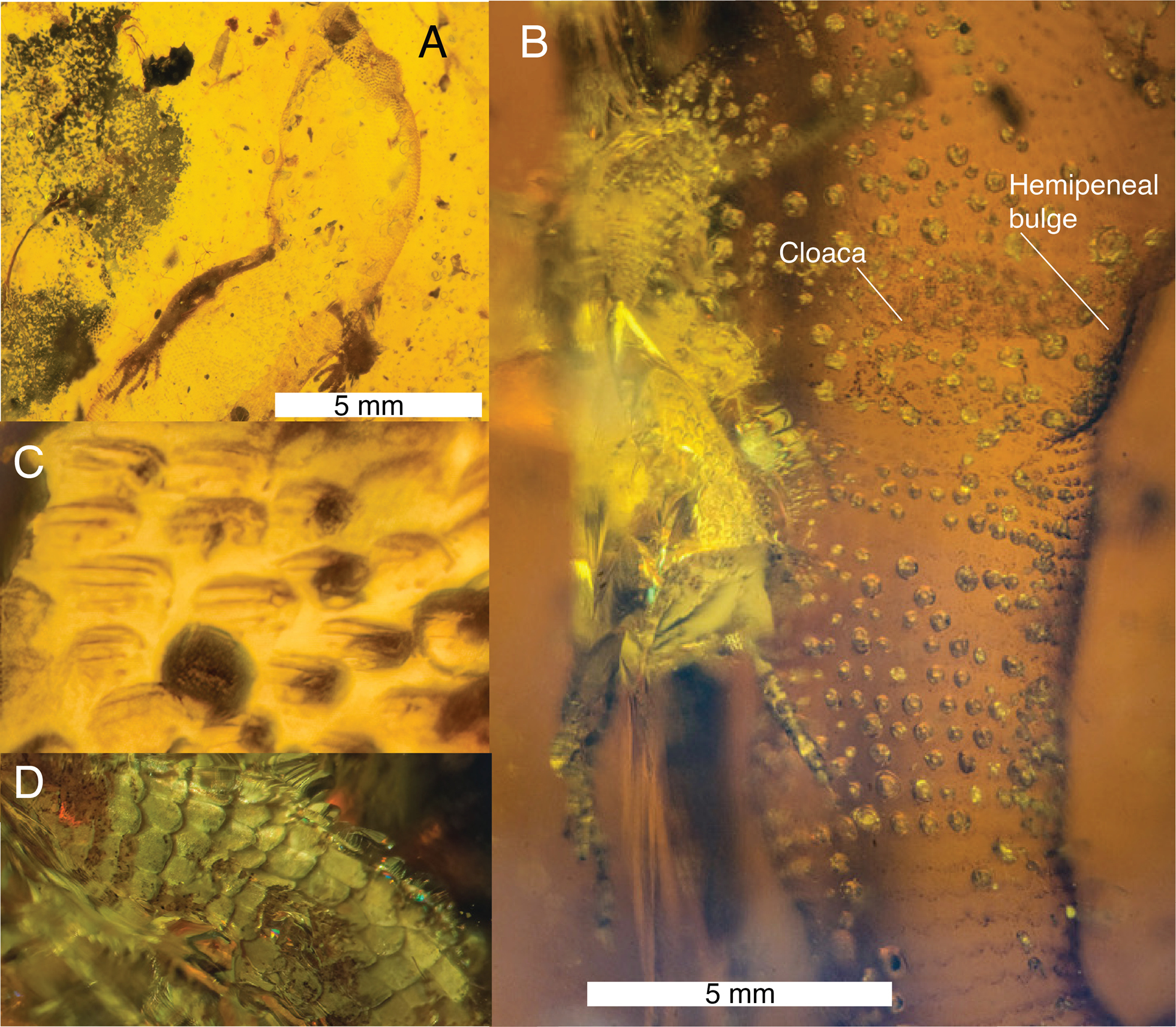
Integumentary anatomy of the C. rusmithii holotype

The Carinasquama fossil material was discovered in amber mines in Myanmar, after which they were purchased from fossil traders in China. The exact locality from which they originated is unknown, but it was likely from Kachin State. One specimen was purchased by British geologist Ru D. A. Smith in December 2015, after which it was shipped to the United States. Smith showed the specimen to Juan D. Daza in February 2016, and they arranged for it to be CT scanned in November of that year at the University of Texas High-Resolution X-Ray CT Facility. In April 2022, Smith donated this specimen to the National Museum of Scotland (NMS), where it is now accessioned as specimen NMS G.2022.2.1. A second similar specimen was first described in a 2016 publication under the specimen number JZC Bu269, as part of the James Zigras Collection. It was CT scanned at the American Museum of Natural History and is now housed at the Houston Museum of Natural Science as specimen HMNS.PB.729.

In 2026, Daza and colleagues described Carinasquama rusmithii as a new genus and species of extinct lizard based on these fossil remains, establishing NMS G.2022.2.1 as the holotype specimen and HMNS.PB.729 as a paratype. The generic name, Carinasquama, combines the Latin words carina, meaning 'keel' and squama, meaning 'scale', alluding to the multi-keeled scales seen in both known individuals. The specific name, rusmithii, honors Ru Smith, the donor of the holotype specimen.

== Description ==
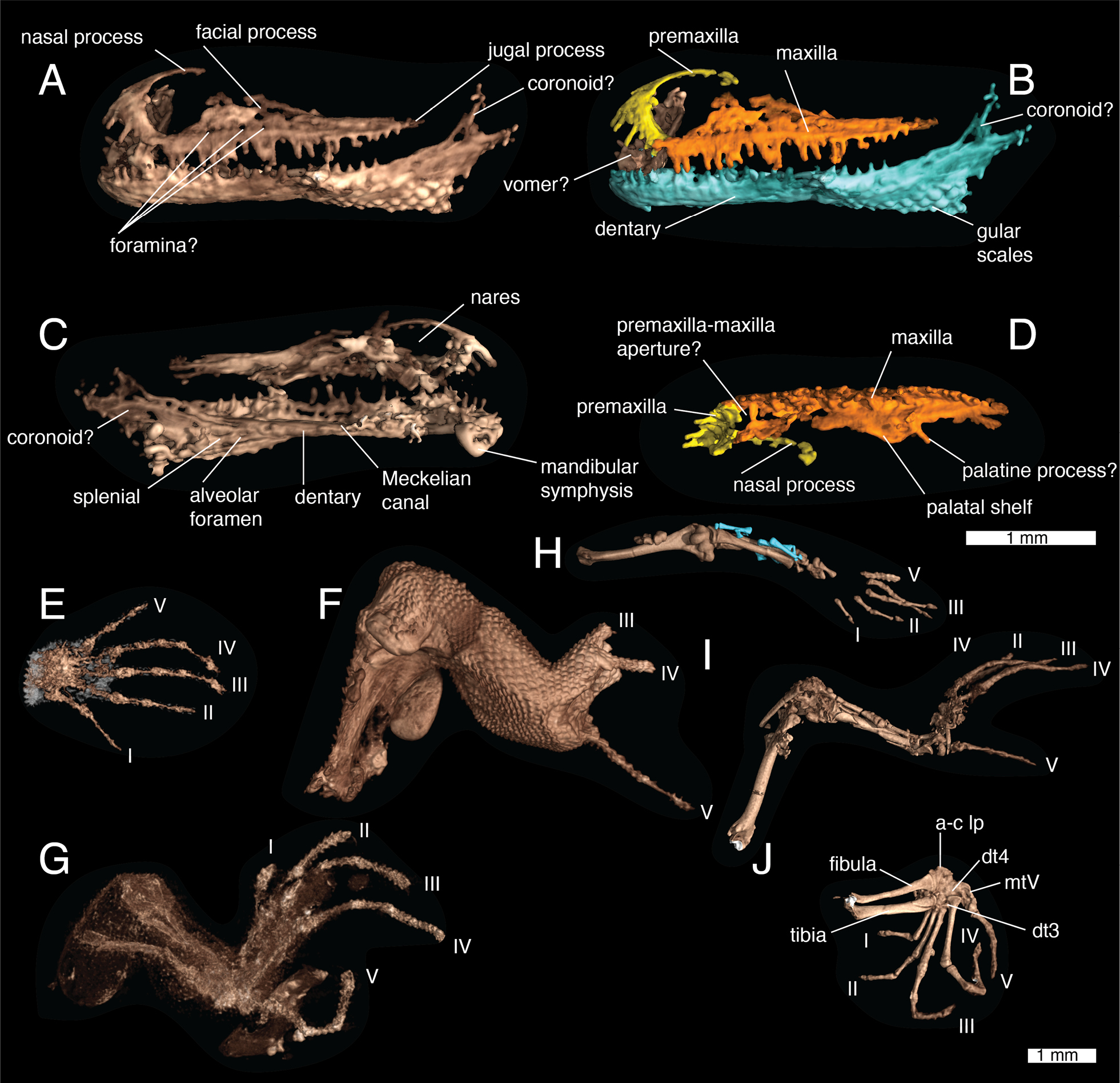
Skeletal anatomy of Carinasquama: skull (A–D), forelimb (E, H), and hindlimb (F, G, I, J)

Carinosquama is a very small lizard, with a snout–vent length of 1.62–2.19 centimetres (0.64–0.86 in). This is comparable to the smallest modern geckos, which are in the genus Sphaerodactylus (e.g., S. ariasae, S. parthenopion, and S. schwartzi). The body of Carinasquama is depressed, and the tail is about the length of the body. The scales are widely spaced and arranged in rings covering the body, with each scale having between four and six parallel keels. The hindlimb digits are long and slender.

While most of both specimens are just hollow body outlines, both retain articulated bones in the limbs, and the paratype has several skull bones. These include a left premaxilla (tooth-bearing bone at the front of the snout), which has seven tooth positions, while the maxilla (primary tooth-bearing bone of the upper jaw) has about 25 tooth positions. The dentary (main lower jaw bone) has around 24 positions, the teeth of which are well-spaced and mostly straight.

=== Classification and relationships ===
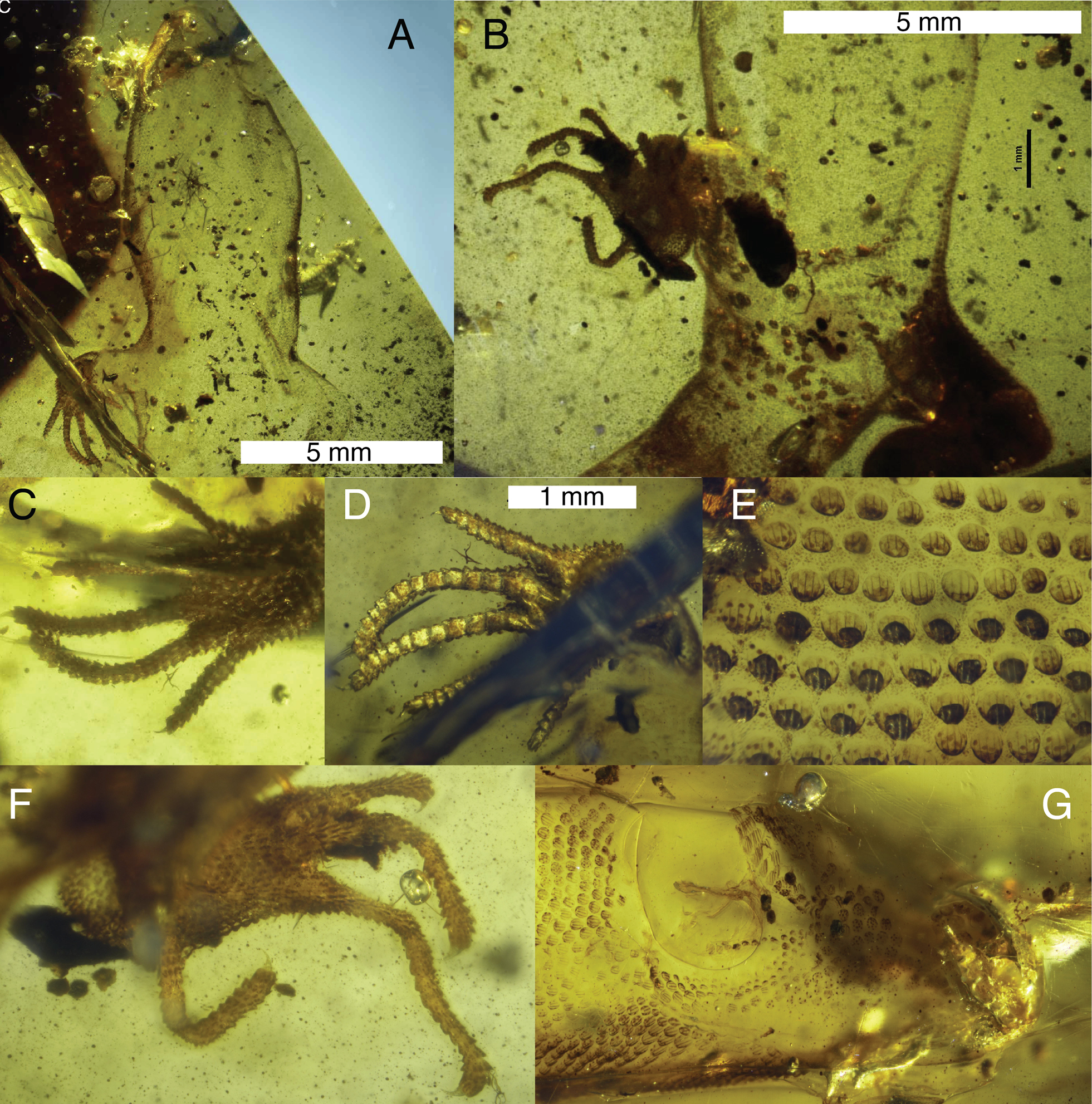
Integumentary anatomy of the C. rusmithii paratype, including the hand (C–D), foot (F), and head (G)

Carinasquama shares several features of the integument with modern gekkotans (geckos). These include a missing frontal scale and frontoparietal scale, and the presence of homogeneous cephalic scales that are small and granular. Furthermore, the scales are largely consistent in size across the body, and the scales are separated by interstitial skin. As in most gekkotans except those in the family Eublepharidae (eyelid geckos), it lacks eyelids, the eyes instead being covered by a fused scale (brille).

Gekkota is the clade comprising all living geckos and their immediate extinct relatives. The extinct taxa outside of this group but more closely related to geckos than any other living lizard group are part of Pan-Gekkota (also called Gekkonomorpha). Unlike the general gekkonomorph condition, but similar to Ardeosaurus and Eichstaettisaurus (which some researchers regard as gekkonomorphs), the premaxillae are paired. A parietal eye is not visible in the known Carinasquama specimens, suggesting a parietal foramen in the skull was not present, contrasting with the aforementioned gekkonomorphs and Limnoscansor, Helioscopos, and Norellius. The second phalanx of the fourth manual (hand) digit is shortened, a feature shared with gekkotans and anoles. The astragalocalcaneum (an ankle bone formed by the fusion of the astragalus and calcaneus) has an enlarged process facing outward, a feature seen in gekkotans but not other squamates. The adhesive toe pads characteristic of modern geckos are not present in Carinasquama.

== Paleobiology ==
The toe claws of Carinasquama are small and not recurved, and the penultimate phalanges are not arcuate (curved). This contrasts with the arcuate penultimate phalanges of modern scansorial geckos (those adapted to climbing). This implies Carinasquama was instead a more terrestrial animal.

=== Sex identification ===
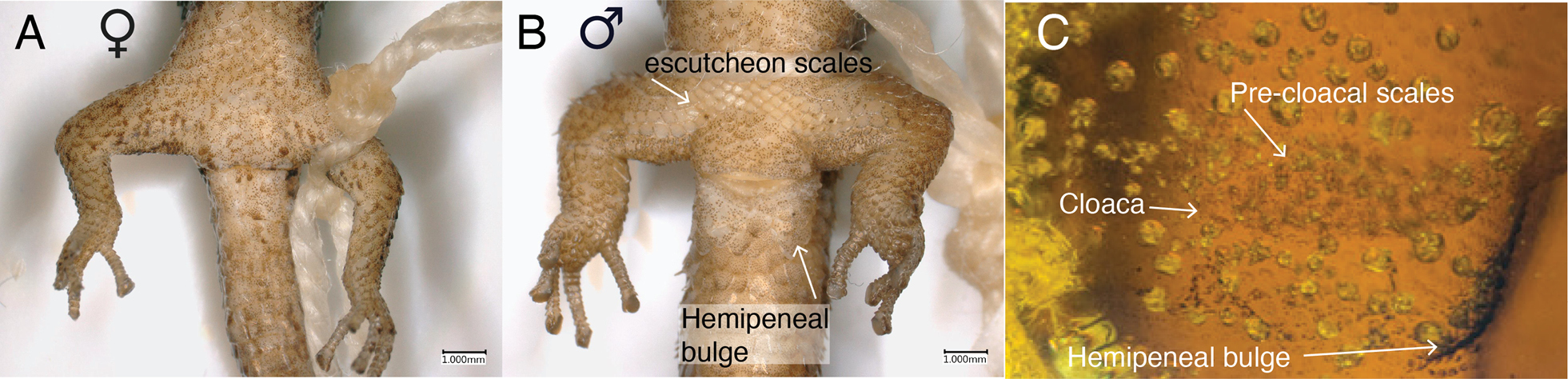
Cloaca region of Carinasquama (right) compared to female (left) and male (center) Sphaerodactylus macrolepis

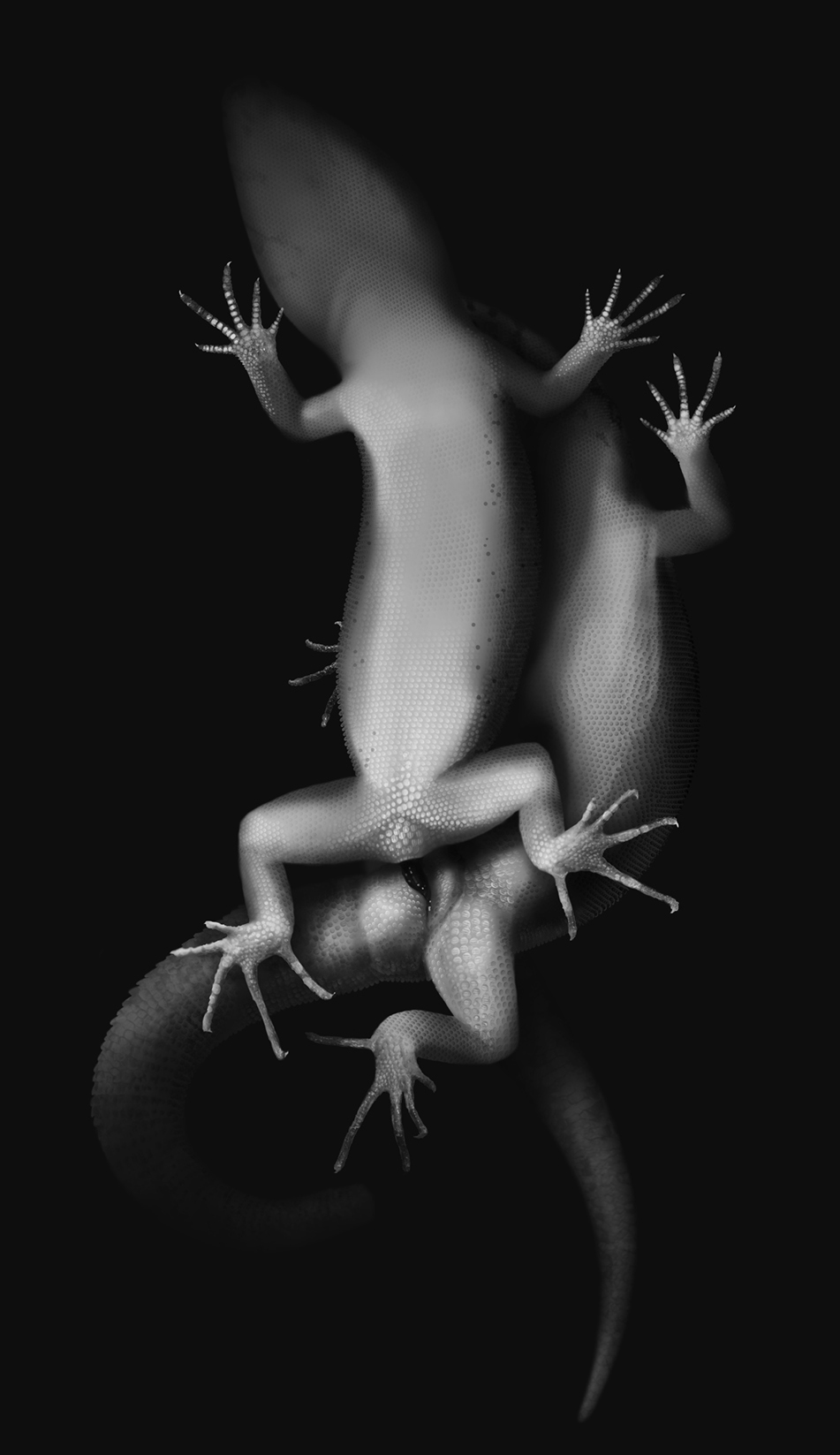
Life restoration of two Carinasquama individuals mating

Identifying the sex of fossil animals is often impossible due to the lack of preserved soft tissues, especially those confidently correlated to sex. The holotype of C. rusmithii preserves a swollen region posterior (toward the rear) to the cloaca. Daza and colleagues interpreted this as a hemipenal bulge, a feature seen in many extant male lizards. This implies the presence of the paired copulatory organs (hemipenes) that, among other features, distinguish male squamates from females. A hemipenal bulge is not observable in the paratype specimen.

== See also ==
- Paleobiota of Burmese amber
- Cretaceogekko – an extinct contemporary gecko
