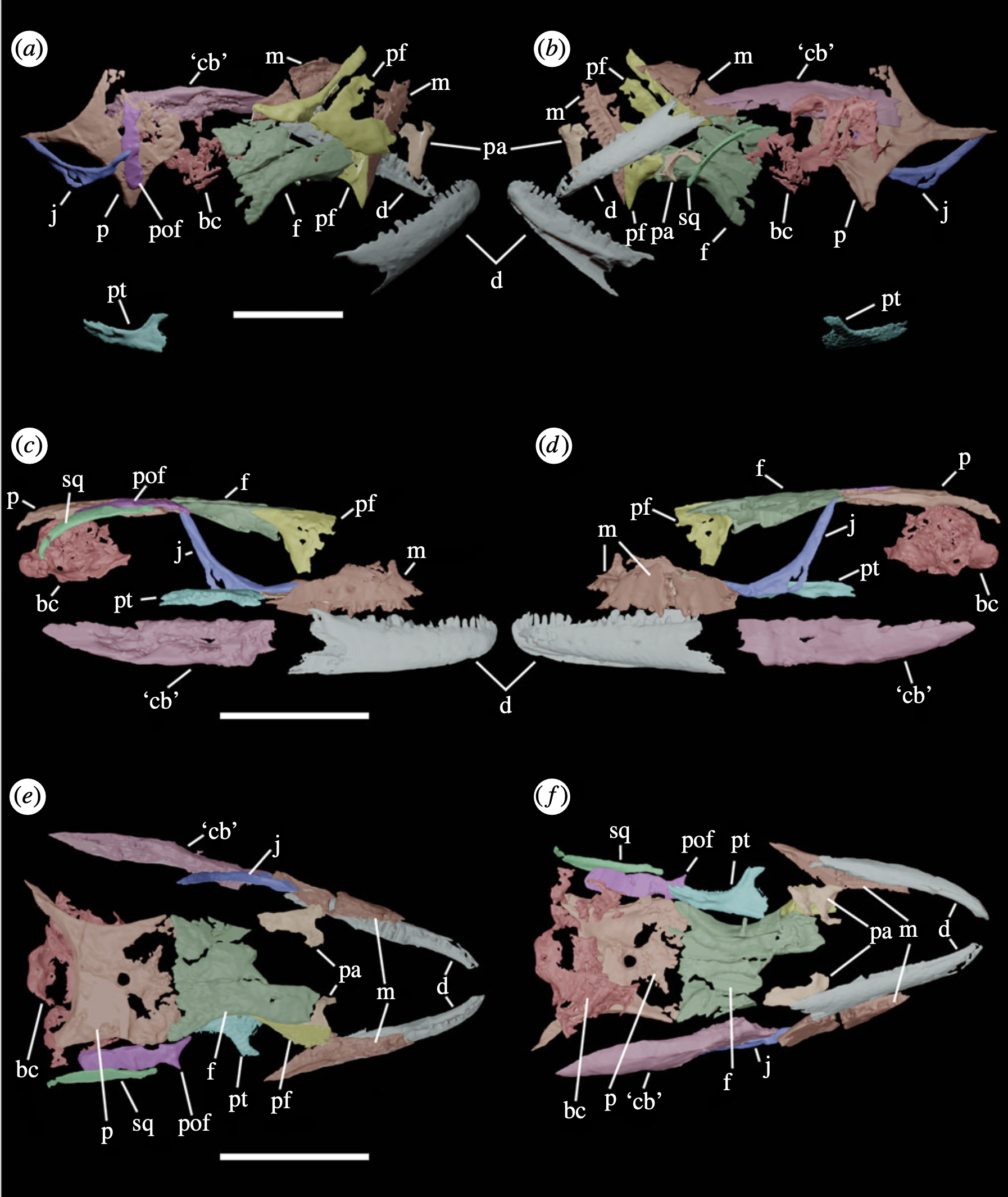
- CT scans of the skull of Helioscopos in multiple views

Scientific classification
- Domain: Eukaryota
- Kingdom: Animalia
- Phylum: Chordata
- Class: Reptilia
- Order: Squamata
- Family: †Ardeosauridae
- Genus: †Helioscopos; Meyer et al., 2023

Type species
- †Helioscopos dickersonae Meyer et al., 2023

Synonyms
- Helioscopus dickersonae (preoccupied name)

= Helioscopos =

Helioscopos Temporal range: Late Jurassic (Tithonian), 150–149 Ma

Extinct genus of lizards

Helioscopos (/ˌhiːlioʊˈskoːʊpoʊs/) is an extinct genus of ardeosaurid lizard from the Late Jurassic Morrison Formation of the United States.

== Discovery and naming ==
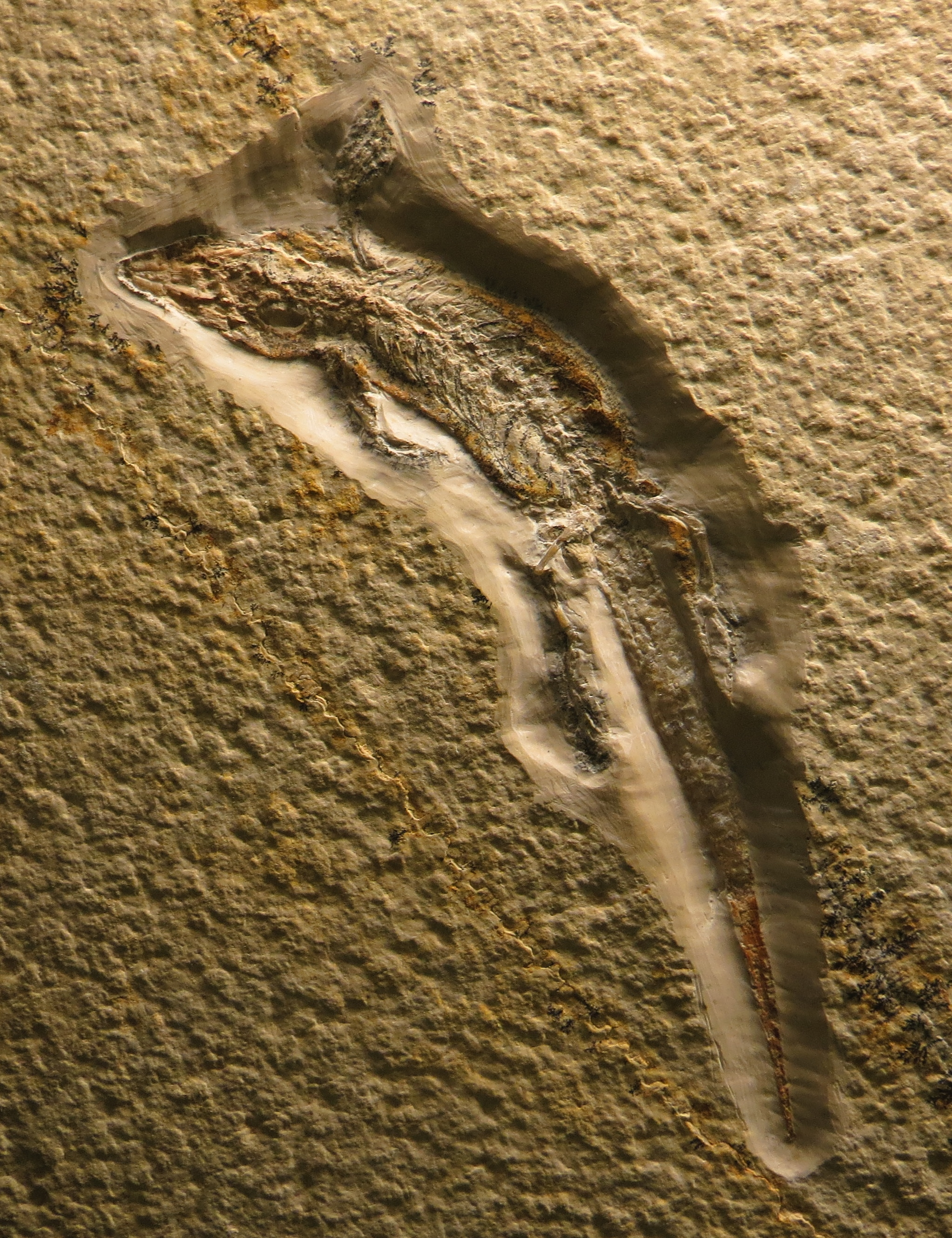
Ardeosaurus, a close relative of Helioscopos from the Jurassic of Germany

The type specimen of Helioscopos, given the designation DINO 15914 (previously DNM 15914), was discovered at Dinosaur National Monument from a locality called "Quarry #317". This locality is part of the famous and well-studied Morrison Formation in Utah. When the specimen was originally reported on in 1998, it was suggested to belong to the genus Paramacellodus, which is known from throughout the Northern Hemisphere in the Late Jurassic. However, the specimen was re-examined in 2023 by a team of authors including Dalton Meyer, Chase Brownstein, Kelsey Jenkins, and Jacques Gauthier in the same publication that they named the new genus Limnoscansor.

This re-examination included CT-scanning the specimen, which was preserved in 3D, to study each of bone more thoroughly. Meyer and colleagues determined that the specimen did not belong to Paramacellodus and should be given a new name. The name they gave the specimen was Helioscopus dickersonae. The name is derived from the Ancient Greek words "helios" meaning "sun" and "scopós" meaning "watcher". This name was given in reference to the large pineal foramen present in the fossil. The specific epithet "dickersonae" was given to honor two family members of the principal author (who had the last name Dickerson) as well as Mary Cynthia Dickerson, the first curator of herpetology at the American Museum of Natural History. The genus name also mirrors the extant lizard species Phrynocephalus helioscopus (commonly called the "sunwatcher").

Shortly after the paper was published, it was discovered that the name Helioscopus was preoccupied by another genus of prehistoric lizard. In a supplement to the original publication, the authors amended the name to be spelled Helioscopos.

== Description ==
The holotype and only specimen of Helioscopos is a partial skull and mandibles. Among the bones preserved are the maxillae, prefrontals, the parietal bone, the right postorbitofrontal and squamosal, the left jugal, part of both palatines, the right pterygoid, both dentaries, the left postdentaries, and part of the braincase.

In their description, Meyer and colleagues assessed the ontogeny of the specimen based on the degree of fusion of some of the skull bones. The sphenoid and basioccipital bones are fully fused, as are the surangular and prearticular bones. These skull characteristics are generally recognized as markers of skeletal maturity, based on study of the skulls of western whiptails, and the authors conclude that Helioscopos was a fully grown individual when it died.

== Classification ==
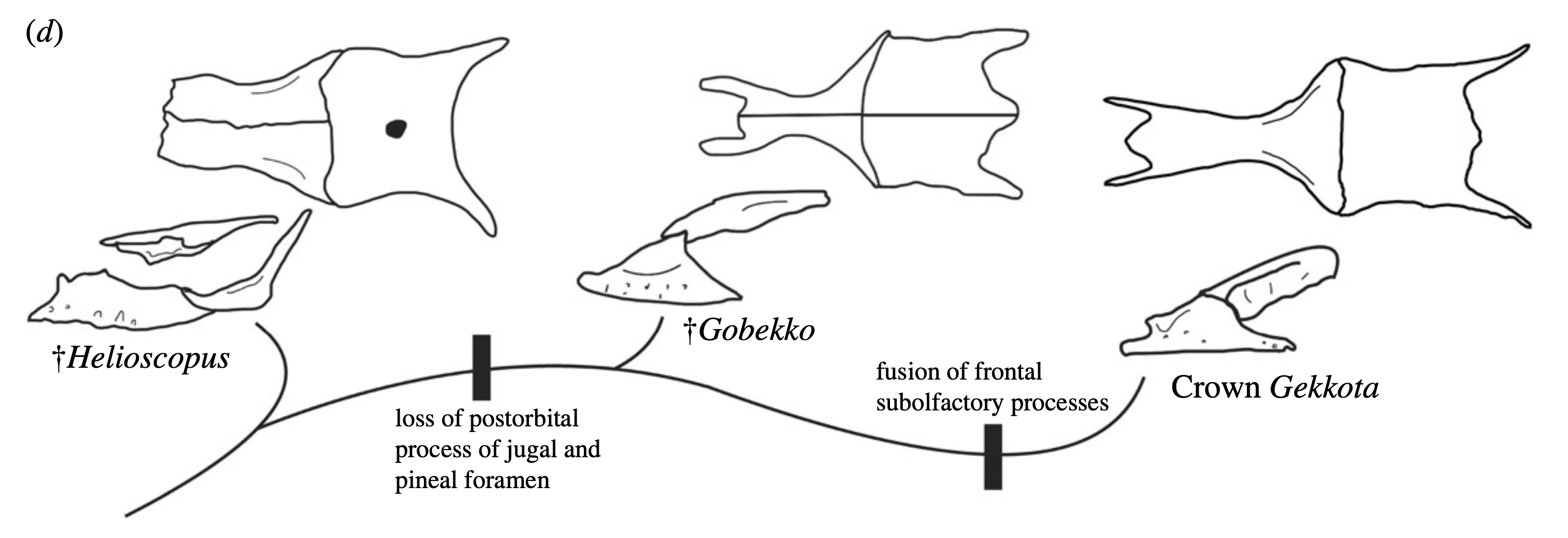
Diagram showing the evolution of the skull bones in stem-geckoes, with Helioscopos on the left

In their description of Helioscopos, Meyer and colleagues conducted a phylogenetic analysis to determine the evolutionary relationships of the new taxon. They found it to be a member of the family Ardeosauridae and suggested that this family was a stem-member of Gekkota. The affinities of Ardeosauridae are generally controversial among researchers. A simplified version of the phylogeny recovered by the authors is shown below.

- Pan-Gekkota
  - Ardeosauridae
    - †Limnoscansor
    - - †Ardeosaurus
      - †Helioscopos
  - - †Schoenesmahl
    - - †Eichstaettisaurus
      - - †Norellius
        - - †Hoburogekko
          - Gekkota

== Paleoenvironment ==
The only fossils of Helioscopos currently known were discovered at Dinosaur National Monument in a quarry which corresponds to the Late Jurassic-aged Morrison Formation. The sedimentary geology of the area indicates that, during the Jurassic Period, the area was a seasonally-variable alluvial plain dominated by conifers, ferns, and cycads. Other vertebrate life from the area included other reptiles such as turtles, rhynchocephalians, and crocodyliformes, such as the genera Goniopholis and Hoplosuchus. The dominant terrestrial life of the time were the non-avian dinosaurs. Among the dinosaurs known from Dinosaur National Monument are the giant sauropods Camarasaurus, Apatosaurus, Diplodocus, and Barosaurus, the theropods Allosaurus and Ceratosaurus, and several ornithischian genera including Stegosaurus, Camptosaurus, and Dryosaurus.
