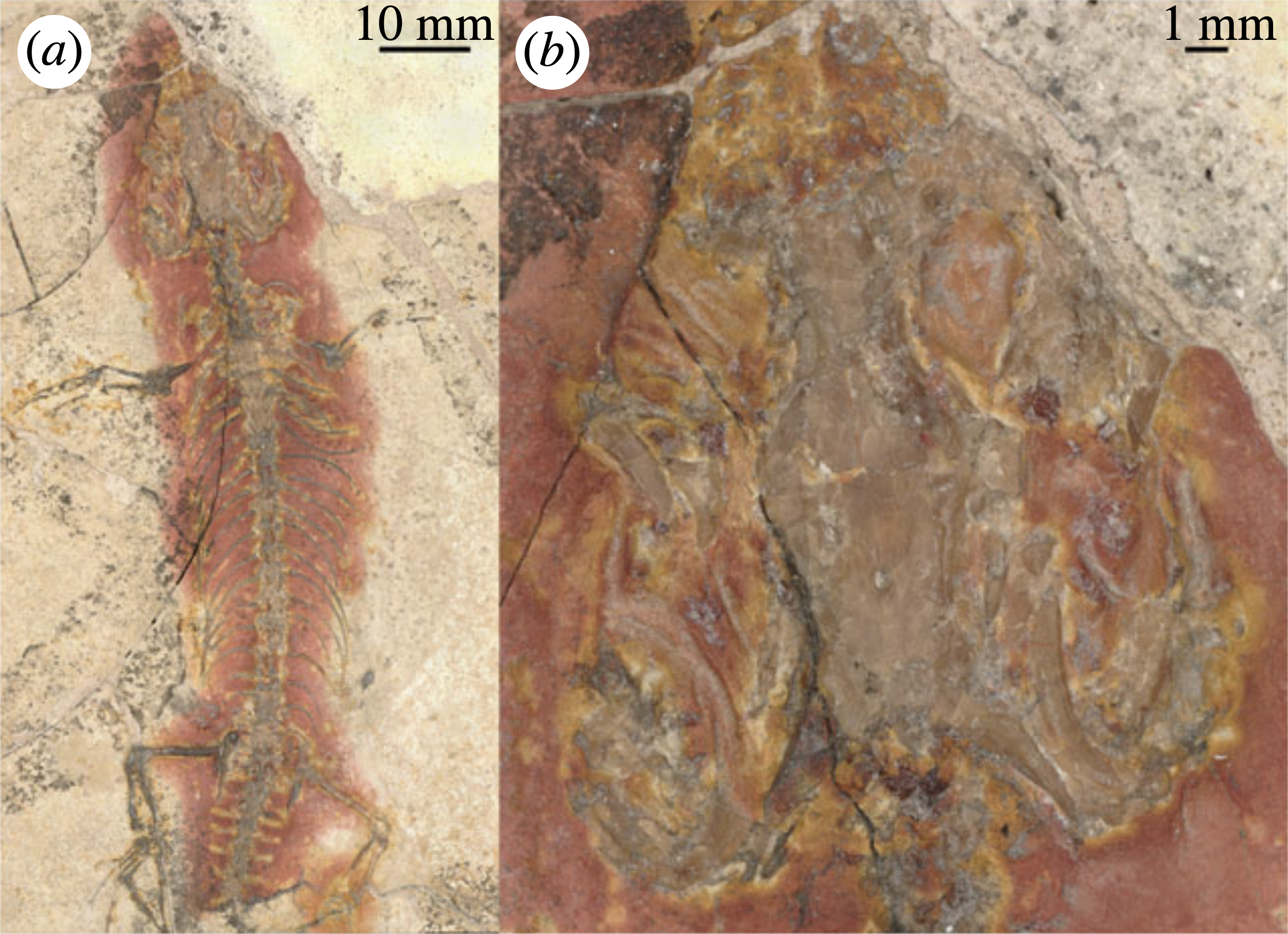
- Holotype of Limnoscansor (left), and close-up of the skull (right)

Scientific classification
- Domain: Eukaryota
- Kingdom: Animalia
- Phylum: Chordata
- Class: Reptilia
- Order: Squamata
- Family: †Ardeosauridae
- Genus: †Limnoscansor; Meyer et al., 2023

Type species
- †Homeosaurus digitatellus Grier, 1914

Species
- †Limnoscansor digitatellus (Grier, 1914) Meyer et al., 2023

Synonyms
- Homeosaurus digitatellus Grier, 1914; Eichstaettisaurus digitatellus (Grier, 1914) Cocude-Michel, 1963; Ardeosaurus digitatellus (Grier, 1914) Hoffstetter, 1964

= Limnoscansor =

Limnoscansor Temporal range: Late Jurassic (Tithonian), 152–149 Ma

Extinct genus of lizards

Limnoscansor (/ˌlɪm͡nəuskɑːnsʊr/) is an extinct genus of ardeosaurid lizard from the Late Jurassic Solnhofen Limestone of Germany.

== Discovery and naming ==
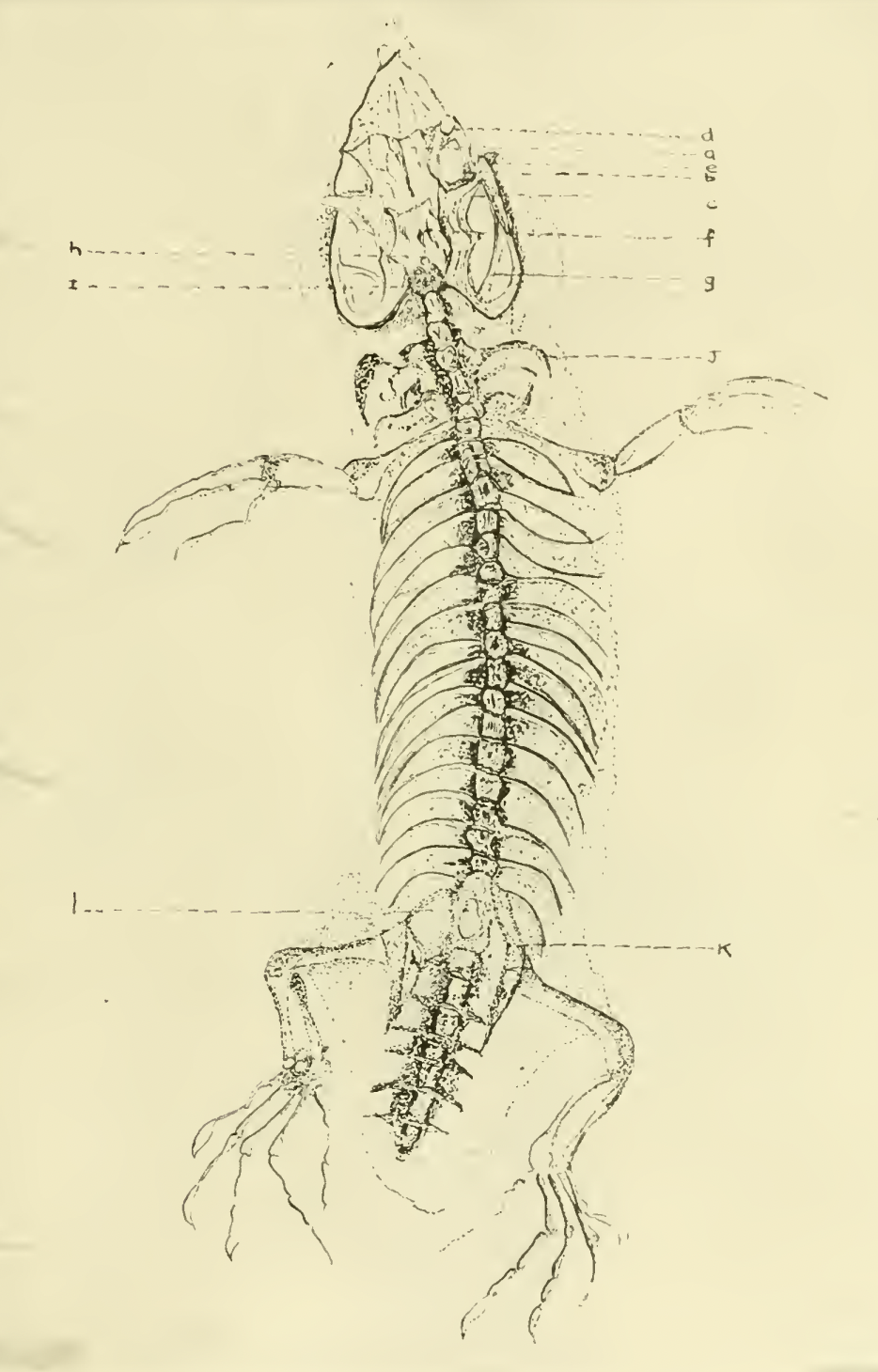
Line drawing of the holotype of Limnoscansor from its 1914 description

The holotype and only known specimen of Limnoscansor, given the designation CM 4026, was discovered in Wintershof Quarry near Eichstätt in the rocks of the Solnhofen Limestone, a geological unit well-known for its exceptional preservation of small animals. It was originally named and described by Normal MacDowell Grier in the Annals of the Carnegie Museum of Natural History in 1914 as a new species of the rhynchocephalian Homeosaurus, which is known from Solnhofen as well as other Jurassic-aged units. He gave it the species epithet, "digitatellus", in reference to the apparently fragile digits of the specimen, which appear to have been damaged some time after the animal died, but before it was fossilized.

Upon re-examination in 1963, the French paleontologist Marguerite Cocude-Michel realized that CM 4026 did not belong to a rhynchocephalian, and instead represented a species of squamate, related to modern geckos. He referred the specimen to the genus Eichstaettisaurus, discovered at the same locality as CM 4026. The next year, another French researcher, Robert Hoffstetter, reassigned the specimen to the genus Ardeosaurus.

Under the name Ardeosaurus digitatellus, the specimen was given a detailed description in a 2016 publication by several researchers from the University of Alberta including Tiago Simões, Michael Caldwell, Randall Nydam, and Paulina Jiménez-Huidobro. A few years later, in 2023, the specimen was re-examined by a team of authors including Dalton Meyer, Chase Brownstein, Kelsey Jenkins, and Jacques Gauthier. In their analyses, they failed to recover the genus Ardeosaurus as monophyletic, so they elected to assign A. digitatellus to its own genus to prevent future taxonomic instability from making its classification even more convoluted. They named this new genus Limnoscansor, which is derived from the Ancient Greek word "limnes", meaning "lake" or "marsh", in reference to the paleoenvironment of the Solnhofen Limestone, and the Latin word "scansorius", meaning "to climb", in reference to its hypothesized climbing abilities.

== Description ==
The holotype of Limnoscansor is a nearly complete skull and postcranial skeleton preserved fully articulated in dorsal view. The specimen only lacks the hands and the posterior portion of the tail.

== Classification ==
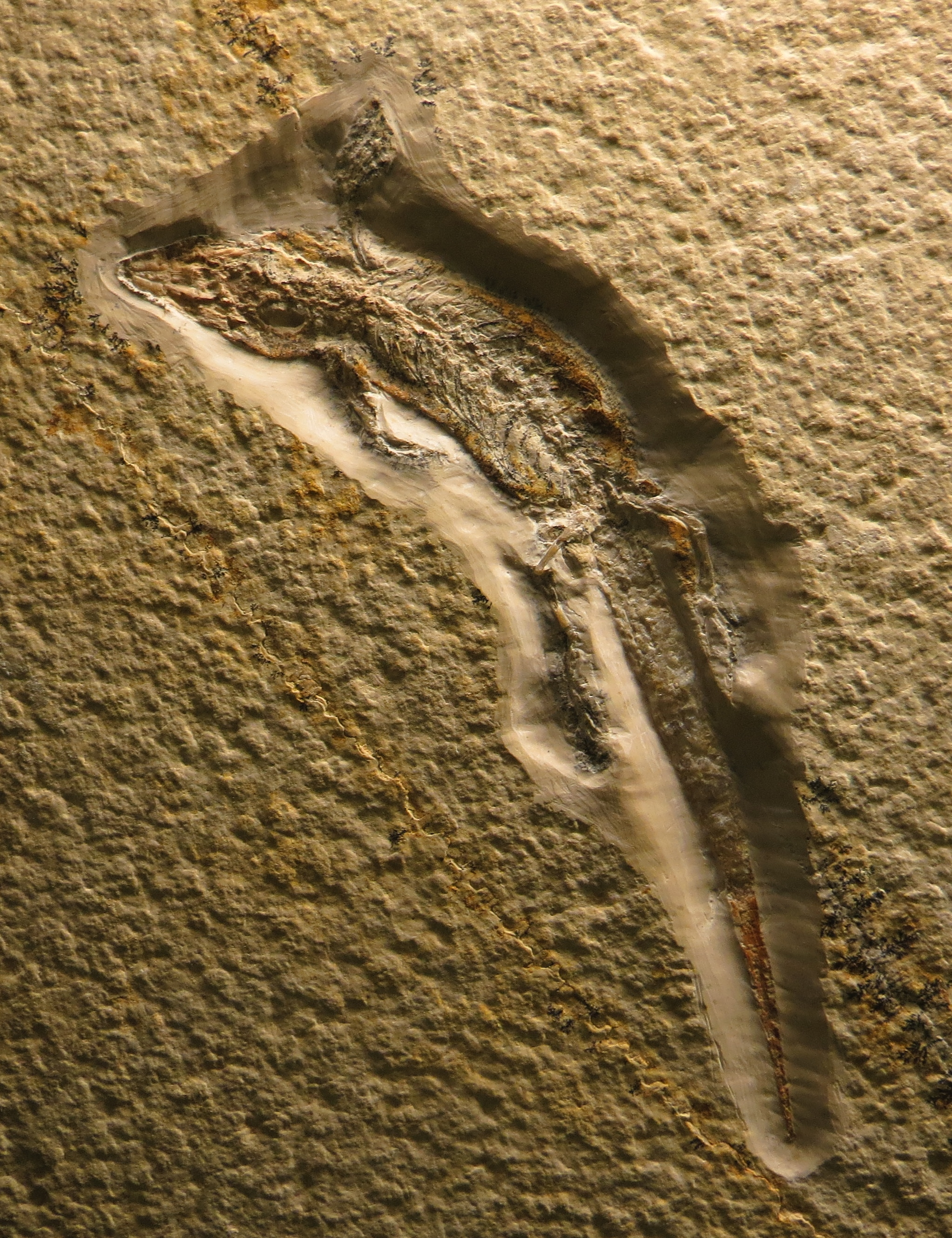
Ardeosaurus, a close relative of Limnoscansor from the Jurassic of Germany

In their description of Limnoscansor, Meyer and colleagues conducted a phylogenetic analysis to determine the evolutionary relationships of the new taxon. They found it to be a member of the family Ardeosauridae, and suggested that this family was part of stem-Gekkota. The affinities of Ardeosauridae are generally controversial among researchers. A simplified version of the phylogeny recovered by the authors is shown below.

- Pan‑Gekkota
  - Ardeosauridae
    - †Limnoscansor
    - - †Ardeosaurus
      - †Helioscopos
  - - †Schoenesmahl
    - - †Eichstaettisaurus
      - - †Norellius
        - - †Hoburogekko
          - Gekkota

== Paleoenvironment ==
Other small reptiles are known from the Wintershof Quarry including the closely related squamates Ardeosaurus and Eichstaettisaurus, the rhynchocephalian Pleurosaurus, the crocodyliform Alligatorellus, and the pterosaur Ctenochasma. The locality also preserves a variety of insect fossils including scorpionflies, dragonflies, and stem-dragonflies.
