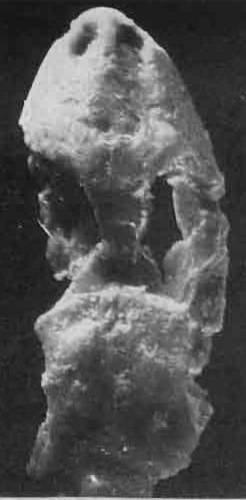
- Gobekko cretacicus

Scientific classification
- Kingdom: Animalia
- Phylum: Chordata
- Class: Reptilia
- Order: Squamata
- Suborder: Gekkota
- Genus: †Gobekko; Borsuk-Białynicka, 1990

Type species
- †Gobekko cretacicus Borsuk-Białynicka, 1990

= Gobekko =

Gobekko Temporal range: Late Cretaceous, 75 Ma

Extinct genus of lizards

Gobekko is an extinct genus of gecko or gecko-like lizard from the Late Cretaceous Djadokhta Formation of the Gobi Desert in Mongolia. Gobekko is either a basal member of Gekkota, the group that includes geckos and the legless pygopodid lizards, or a stem-gekkotan outside Gekkota but within the larger group Gekkonomorpha. It is among the oldest known members of Gekkonomorpha, alongside Hoburogekko, a gecko from the Early Cretaceous of Mongolia, AMNH FR21444, an unnamed specimen also from the Early Cretaceous of Mongolia, and Cretaceogekko, a gecko preserved in amber from the Early Cretaceous of Burma.
