= Gurvelus =

Gurvelus Temporal range: Aptian–Albian

Scientific classification
- Domain: Eukaryota
- Kingdom: Animalia
- Phylum: Chordata
- Class: Reptilia
- Order: Squamata
- Family: †Ardeosauridae
- Genus: †Gurvelus
- Species: †G. khangaicus

Binomial name
- †Gurvelus khangaicus Alifanov, 2019

Extinct lizard genus

Gurvelus is an extinct genus of ardeosaurid that lived during the Early Cretaceous epoch.

== Distribution ==
Gurvelus khangaicus is known from the Hühteeg Horizon of Mongolia.
