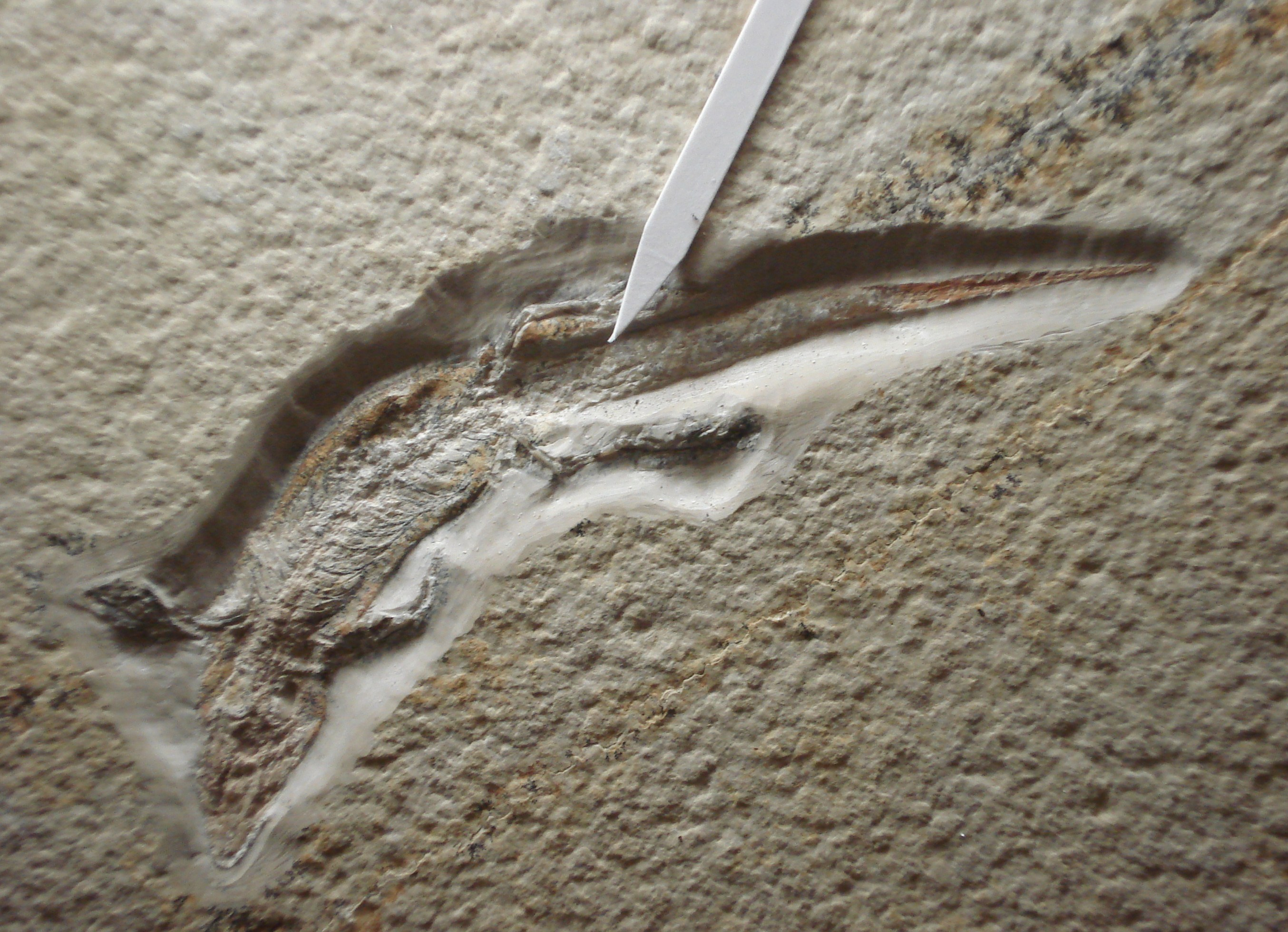
- Ardeosaurus

Scientific classification
- Kingdom: Animalia
- Phylum: Chordata
- Class: Reptilia
- Order: Squamata
- Family: †Ardeosauridae; Camp, 1923

= Ardeosauridae =

Ardeosauridae Temporal range: Late Jurassic–Early Cretaceous

Extinct family of lizards

Ardeosauridae is an extinct family of lizards known from the Late Jurassic of Germany and North America and Early Cretaceous of Mongolia, with other potential species elsewhere from Europe and Asia over the same time period.

The position of this family is debated; they are often recovered as gekkonomorphs, but other studies have found them to be basal squamates, whereas others have found them to be the basalmost members of the Scincoidea or Iguania.

The following genera are known:

- †Ardeosaurus Meyer, 1855
- ? †Chometokadmon Costa, 1864
- †Gurvelus Alifanov, 2019
- †Helioscopos Meyer et al. 2023
- †Limnoscansor Meyer et al. 2023
- ? †Palaeolacerta Cocude-Michel, 1961
- †?Schoenesmahl Conrad, 2018
- ? †Yabeinosaurus Endo and Shikama, 1942
