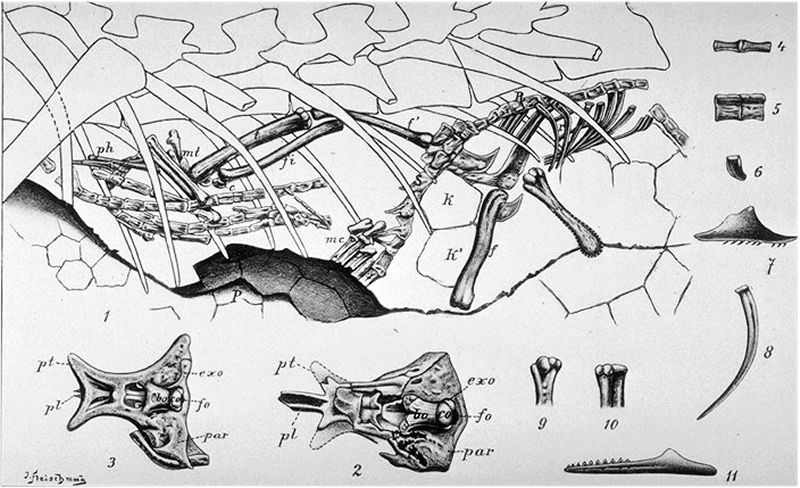
- 1903 illustration of the holotype by Franz Nopcsa

Scientific classification
- Kingdom: Animalia
- Phylum: Chordata
- Class: Reptilia
- Order: Squamata
- Family: †Ardeosauridae
- Genus: †Schoenesmahl; Conrad, 2018
- Species: †S. dyspepsia

Binomial name
- †Schoenesmahl dyspepsia Conrad, 2018

= Schoenesmahl =

Schoenesmahl Temporal range: Late Jurassic, 150.8 Ma

Extinct genus of lizard

Schoenesmahl is an extinct genus of lizard from the Late Jurassic Painten Formation of Germany. It contains only a single species, S. dyspepsia.

== Discovery and naming ==
It is known only from specimen SNSB-BSPG AS I 563b, a single disarticulated specimen (consisting of an incomplete skeleton lacking nasals, vomers, palatines, postorbitals, quadrates, anterior presacral vertebrae, pectoral girdles, most of the radii and ulnae, manus, ilium, ischium, tarsals and the distal pedal phalanges form digits I, II, IV and V).

The holotype of S. dyspepsia is preserved in the stomach of the holotype specimen of the small theropod dinosaur Compsognathus longipes, which was discovered by Joseph Oberndorfer in Kelheim, Bavaria no later than 1859. In 1866, Oberndorfer's collection, including the Schoenesmahl dyspepsia and Compsognathus longipes holotype specimens, was acquired by the paleontological state collection in Munich. Othniel Charles Marsh, who examined the specimen in 1881, thought that this small skeleton in the Compsognathus belly was an embryo, but in 1903, Franz Nopcsa concluded that it was a lizard.

In 1978, John Ostrom identified the remains as belonging to a lizard of the genus Bavarisaurus, which he concluded was a fast and agile runner owing to its long tail and limb proportions. It was moved to the new genus Schoenesmahl in 2018.

== Etymology ==
The status of the specimen as prey for Compsognathus is reflected in the genus and species name, with Schoenesmahl deriving from schöne Mahl (German for "beautiful meal"), while dyspepsia (Greek for "difficult digestion") refers to its undigested nature.

== Classification ==
This specimen was long classified in the genus Bavarisaurus, but a 2018 study found it to be a distinct taxon most closely related to Ardeosaurus and reclassified it as its own genus.

== Description ==
The well-preserved nature of the specimen suggests that it was eaten by the Compsognathus shortly before the latter's own death and preservation. The disarticulated nature of the specimen suggests that as with some modern predatory birds, Compsognathus may have restrained and dismembered Schoenesmahl during consumption, possibly using its hands and teeth.
