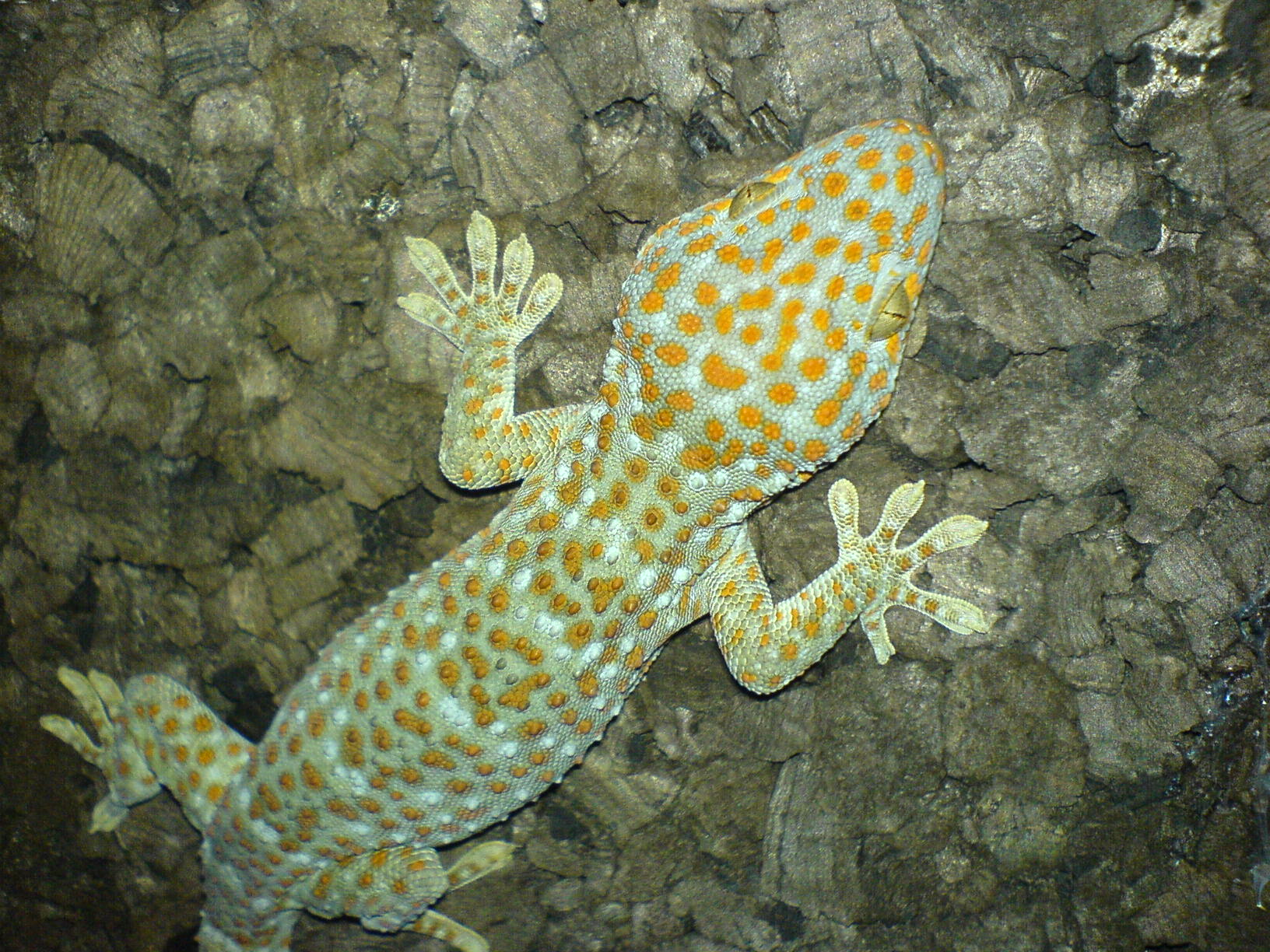
- Gekko gecko, a species used to define Gekkonomorpha

Scientific classification
- Kingdom: Animalia
- Phylum: Chordata
- Class: Reptilia
- Order: Squamata
- Clade: Gekkonomorpha; Fürbringer, 1900

Subgroups
- Gekkota; †Ardeosauridae?; †Bauersaurus; †Carinasquama?; †Eichstaettisaurus?; †Gobekko?; †Hoburogekko?; †Norellius?

Synonyms
- Pan-Gekkota Bauer 2020

= Gekkonomorpha =

Gekkonomorpha Temporal range: Early Cretaceous–Present

Clade of lizards

Gekkonomorpha or Pan-Gekkota is a clade of lizards that includes geckos and their closest relatives. Although it was first named in 1900, Gekkonomorpha was not widely used as a formal taxon until it was given a phylogenetic definition in the 1990s. Under this definition, Gekkonomorpha is a stem-based taxon containing the node-based taxon Gekkota, the group that includes the last common ancestor of all living geckos and its descendants. The extent of Gekkonomorpha beyond gekkotans differs between studies. For example, Lee (1998) defined Gekkonomorpha in such a way that it included not only Gekkota but the legless amphisbaenian and dibamid lizards as well. The phylogenetic analysis of Conrad (2008), which did not support a close relationship between geckos and legless lizards, used Gekkonomorpha in a much more restrictive sense so that it included only Gekkota and a few extinct lizards more closely related to Gekkota than to any other living group of lizards (making them stem-gekkotans). Gobekko has been recovered within and outside of Gekkonomorpha.
