= Hoburogekko =

Hoburogekko Temporal range: Early Cretaceous, Aptian–Albian

Scientific classification
- Domain: Eukaryota
- Kingdom: Animalia
- Phylum: Chordata
- Class: Reptilia
- Order: Squamata
- Infraorder: Gekkota
- Genus: †Hoburogekko; Alifanov, 1989

Type species
- †Hoburogekko suchanovi Alifanov, 1989

Extinct genus of lizards

Hoburogekko is an extinct genus of stem-group gecko that includes a single species, Hoburogekko suchanovi, from the Early Cretaceous Dzunbain Formation of Mongolia. It is known from two fossil specimens, one preserving the front part of the skull and the other preserving part of the lower jaw. Hoburogekko is one of four known Mesozoic geckos or gecko-like lizards, the others being Cretaceogekko from the Early Cretaceous of Burma, AMNH FR21444, an undescribed specimen from a slightly older deposit in Mongolia, and Gobekko from the Late Cretaceous of Mongolia. Hoburogekko is the third oldest known gecko behind AMNH FR21444 and Cretaceogekko.

== Discovery and naming ==
The holotype, PIN 3334-500, a partial skull, was discovered near Khovboor, Mongolia in a layer of the Dzunbain Formation. Hoburogekko suchanovi was named and described by Alifanov (1989).

== Description ==
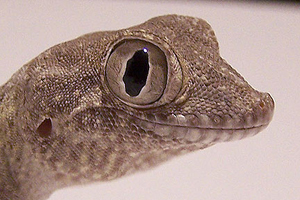
The living gecko species Agamura persica has a tall, blunt snout like Hoburogekko and lives in an arid environment like that which is inferred for Hoburogekko.

The skull of Hoburogekko is short, blunt, and tall. The proportions of its skull bones are similar to those of the living genus Bunopus, although the two are not closely related. The general appearance of Hoburogekko resembles that of the living species Agamura persica, Bunopus tuberculatus, Pristurus carteri, Ptenopus carpi, and Teratoscincus przewalskii, all of which have blunt and tall snouts. Most of these species live on the ground and inhabit desert regions. Hoburogekko probably had a similar lifestyle, fitting with sedimentological evidence that the region of Mongolia in which it was found was semi-arid during the Early Cretaceous. By comparison with living blunt-snouted, desert-dwelling geckos, Hoburogekko may have had a cylindrical body adapted for a burrowing lifestyle.

The total length of the skull of Hoburogekko is estimated to be 1.2 centimetres (0.47 in). The total body length of Hoburogekko difficult to extrapolate from its skull alone because the relative size of the head to the rest of the body varies greatly among living geckos. Based on this range of proportions, Hoburogekko may have been anywhere between 3.5 and 6.0 centimetres (1.4 and 2.4 in) long. Hoburogekko appears primitive in having an open Meckelian groove in the lower jaw that is open at the back and a it is inferred that had a large jugal bone beneath the eye socket, but it is similar to living geckos in having a frontal bone that forms a tube along the midline of the skull. Other derived features of geckos possessed by Hoburogekko include smooth skull bones. Another derived gekkotan characteristic, eye sockets that are not bounded in the back by postorbital bars, may have been present in Hoburogekko, although only the front portion of the eye socket is preserved in the known specimens of Hoburogekko. The large size of the jugal bone suggests that it may have extended backward to form a postorbital bar, in which case Hoburogekko would appear more primitive.

== Relationships ==
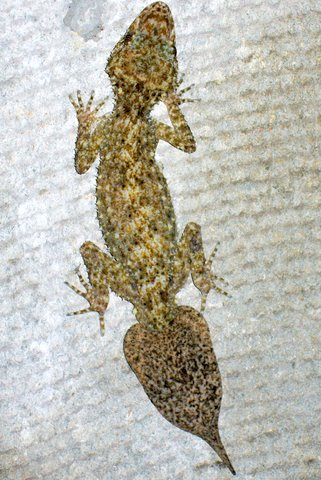
The broad-tailed gecko, Phyllurus platurus, as well as other members of Carphodactylidae, may be closely related to Hoburogekko.

Hoburogekko was recognized as a close relative of geckos since it was first named in 1989. However, a paucity of distinguishing characteristics in the two known specimens of Hoburogekko meant that its evolutionary relationships were not evaluated in a phylogenetic analysis until many years after its first description. The phylogenetic analysis of Daza et al. (2012) found Hoburogekko to be closely related to the living species Phyllurus platurus, commonly called the broad-tailed gecko. In the analysis, Hoburogekko and Phyllurus are more closely related to the legless pygopodids than they are to most other geckos, burt this position need to be re-evaluated, including more members of the crown group Gekkota. The analysis also included Norellius nyctisaurops and Gobekko and placed them outside Gekkota, the group that includes true geckos, as more basal members of the larger group Gekkonomorpha. Therefore, Hoburogekko may be the most derived of the four known Mesozoic gekkonomorphs. However, the analysis of Daza et al. (2013) placed Hoburogekko in a polytomy or unresolved evolutionary relationship with Gobekko, P. platurus (representing the family Carphodactylidae), pygopodids, and a clade (evolutionary grouping) including all other geckos, meaning that its position within Gekkonomorpha is still uncertain.
