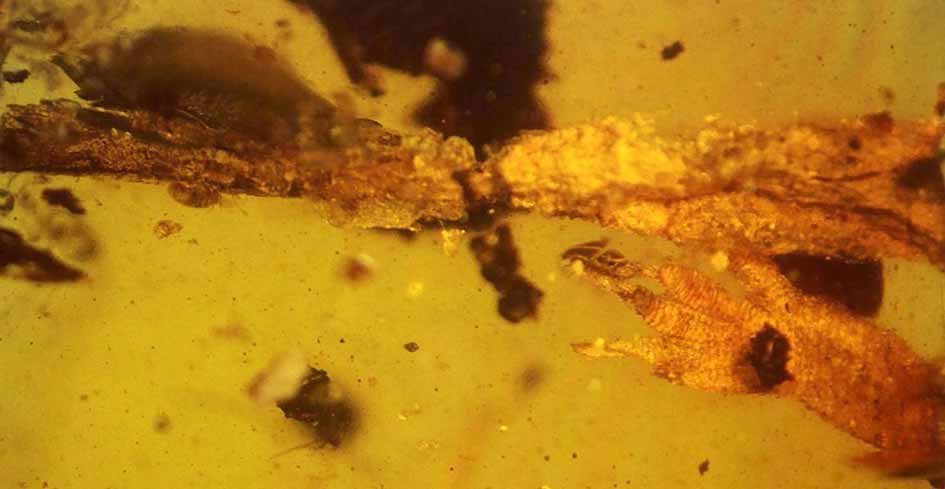
- Holotype of C. burmae

Scientific classification
- Kingdom: Animalia
- Phylum: Chordata
- Class: Reptilia
- Order: Squamata
- Suborder: Gekkota
- Genus: †Cretaceogekko; Arnold & Poinar, 2008

Type species
- †Cretaceogekko burmae Arnold & Poinar, 2008

= Cretaceogekko =

Cretaceogekko Temporal range: 100 Ma

Extinct genus of lizards

Cretaceogekko (meaning “Cretaceous gecko”) is an extinct monotypic genus of gecko (represented by the type species Cretaceogekko burmae) known from a single partial specimen preserved in Burmese amber from the Cenomanian of Myanmar. The specimen was found in the Hukawng Valley in 2001 and the genus and species were named by E. Nicholas Arnold and George Poinar in 2008. The specimen includes a foot and partial tail. Cretaceogekko is the oldest known gecko, predating the Late Cretaceous gecko Gobekko and the Paleogene gecko Yantarogecko, which has also been preserved in amber.

The preserved foot shows that Cretaceogekko already possessed the tiny lamellae or ridges on the toe pads that allow modern geckos to cling to vertical surfaces. Cretaceogekko had a striped skin pattern that probably served as camouflage.
