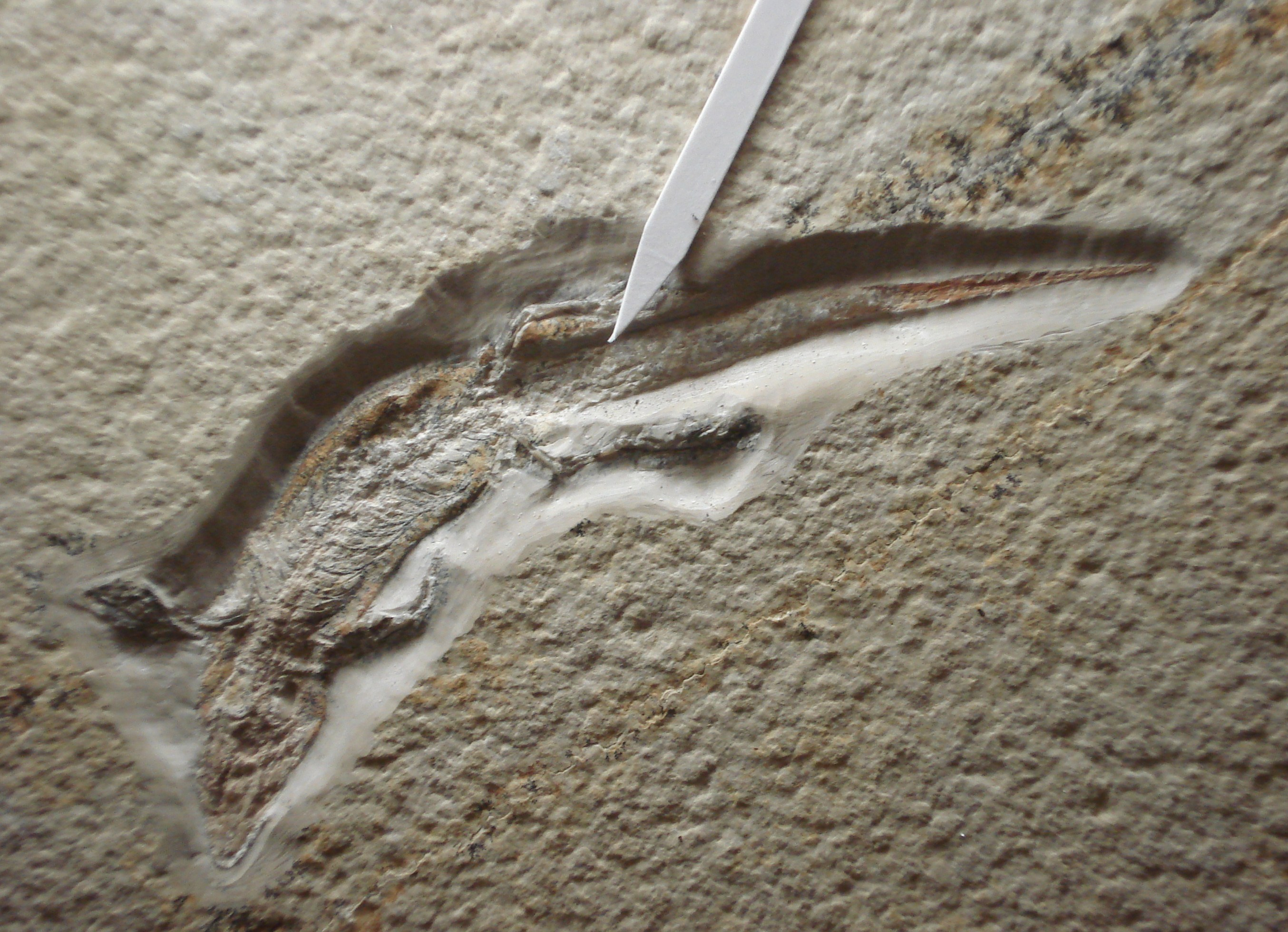
- Fossil specimen

Scientific classification
- Kingdom: Animalia
- Phylum: Chordata
- Class: Reptilia
- Order: Squamata
- Family: †Ardeosauridae
- Genus: †Ardeosaurus; Meyer, 1860

Type species
- †Homeosaurus brevipes Meyer, 1855

Species
- †A. brevipes (Meyer, 1855)

= Ardeosaurus =

Ardeosaurus Temporal range: Tithonian

Extinct genus of lizards

Ardeosaurus is an extinct genus of basal lizards, known from fossils found in the Late Jurassic Solnhofen Plattenkalk of Bavaria, southern Germany. It was originally thought to have been a species of Homeosaurus.

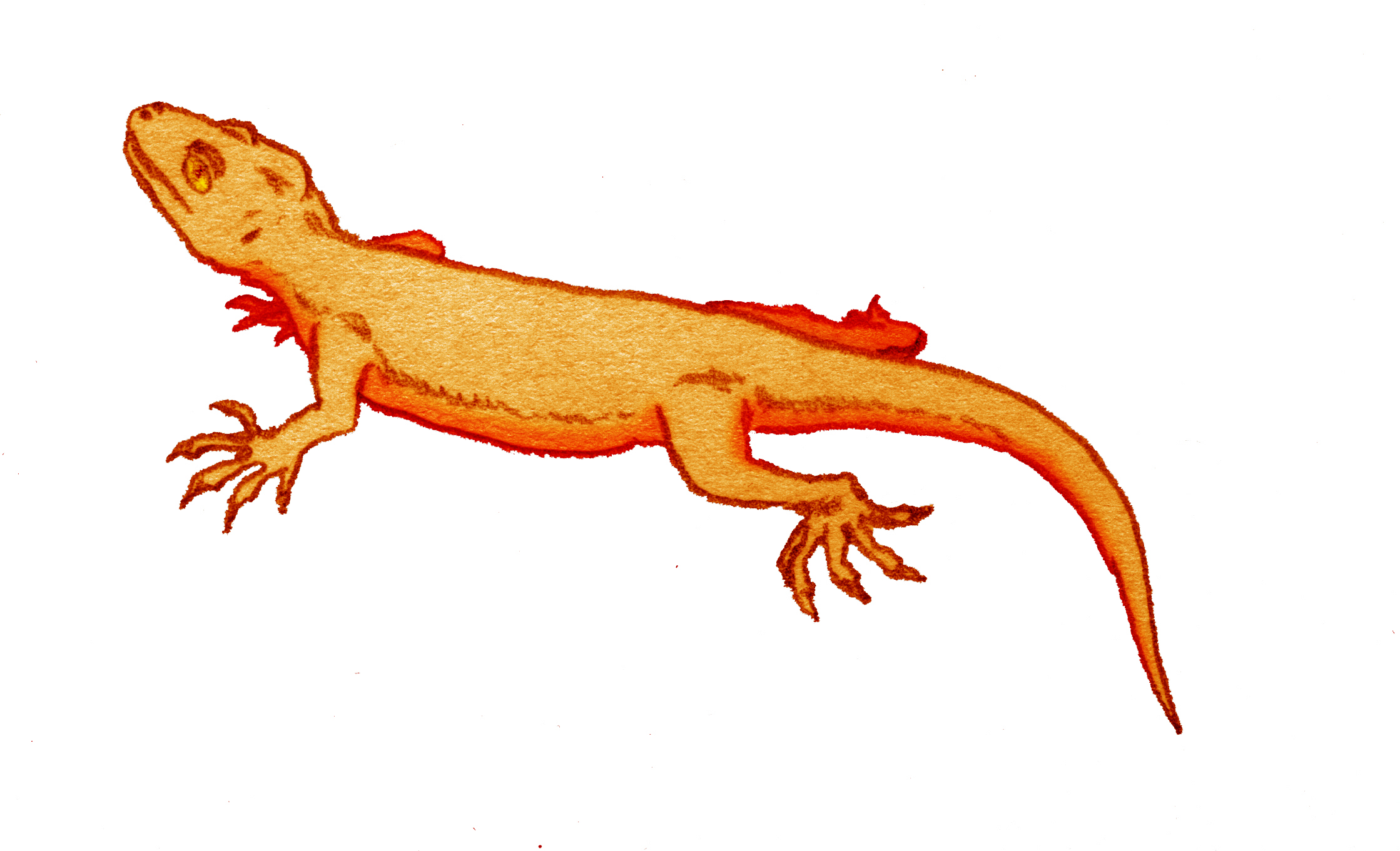
Life restoration

Ardeosaurus was originally considered a distant relative of modern geckos, and had a similar physical appearance. Evans and colleagues, however, showed it in 2005 to be a basal squamate outside the crown group of all living lizards and snakes. A subsequent study conducted by Simões and colleagues in 2017 corroborated its initial proposed phylogenetic placement, indicating that Ardeosaurus was a stem-gekkotan. It was around 20 centimetres (7.9 in) long, with a flattened head and large eyes. It was probably nocturnal, and had jaws specialised for feeding on insects and spiders.
